= Stager =

Stager or Stagers may refer to:

== People ==
- Anson Stager (1825–1885), co-founder of Western Union
- Barbara Stager (born 1948), American murderer
- Gus Stager (born 1920s), American swimming coach
- Kenneth E. Stager (1915–2009), American ornithologist
- Lawrence Stager (1943–2017), American archaeologist

== Other uses ==
- Stager, someone who works to improve the appeal of real estate for sale
- Stager, Michigan, an unincorporated community in Iron County
- The Stagers, a television show
- Old Stagers, an English theatre company
