= Sybil Butler, Marchioness of Ormonde =

Anglo-Irish aristocrat (1888–1948)

The Most Honourable The Marchioness of Ormonde
- Born: The Honourable Sybil Inna Mildred Fellowes; October 24, 1888
- Died: May 18, 1948 (aged 59)
- Known for: Last chatelaine of Kilkenny Castle
- Spouse: George Butler, 5th Marquess of Ormonde (m. 1915)
- Children: Anthony Butler, Viscount Thurles; Lady Moyra Butler
- Parents: William Henry Fellowes, 2nd Baron de Ramsey (father); Lady Rosamond Spencer-Churchill (mother)
- Relatives: Spencer-Churchill family (maternal relatives)

Sybil Inna Mildred Butler, Marchioness of Ormonde (24 October 1888 - 18 May 1948) was an Anglo-Irish aristocrat. In 1915 she married Captain George Butler, who inherited the ancestral Ormonde Estates in Ireland in 1919. She was last Chateleine of the Kilkenny Castle, which was the seat of the Earls and Marquesses of Ormonde for 576 years. She was born the daughter of William Henry Fellowes, 2nd Baron de Ramsey and Lady Rosamond Spencer-Churchill. Through her mother, she was a granddaughter of the 7th Duke of Marlborough, and first-cousin of Sir Winston Churchill.

== Early life ==
Sybil was born the sixth and youngest child of the 2nd Lord and Lady de Ramsey. Her youth was spent at her family's country homes Ramsey Abbey in Huntingdonshire and Haveringland Hall, Norfolk, as well as their London homes at No. 2 Grosvenor Square (1891 to 1895), and later No. 3 Belgrave Square.

In 1911 Sybil travelled in the party of The Second Earl of Londesborough, Lady Londesborough and their daughter Lady Irene Denison aboard the SS Maloja with a contingent of British Aristocrats who accompanied King George V and Queen Mary on their voyage to India to be proclaimed as Emperor and Empress of India at the 1911 Imperial Durbar. The Maloja was the sister-ship of the King and Queen’s vessel, the RMS Medina.

== Marriage ==
On 22 January 1915 Sybil’s engagement to Captain George Butler of the 1st Life Guards was announced. Captain Butler was the eldest son of Lord Arthur Butler and Lady Arthur Butler. Lord Arthur was then the younger brother and heir-presumptive of the 68-year-old James Butler, 3rd Marquess of Ormonde. At the time of George and Sybil's marriage, Lord Ormonde’s 39-year-marriage with Lady Elizabeth Grosvenor had not produced any sons, and it was widely accepted that either Lord Arthur Butler or his son George would be Lord Ormonde's successor to the family's titles and estates, which included Kilkenny Castle, Ballyknockane Lodge, and some 22,000 acres of land in Ireland.

George’s mother Lady Arthur Butler (nee Ellen Stager) was a wealthy American heiress; the family split their time between their leased London townhouse at No. 7 Portman Square, and their Kentish Country Estate Gennings Park.

The wedding took place at St Peter’s, Eaton Square, on Tuesday 23 February 1915. Sybil was given away at the ceremony by her uncle Sir Ailwyn Fellowes, as her father and one of her brothers were interred in Germany as Prisoners of War. Despite the Wartime conditions, the Wedding was a large society affair; amongst those present at the Church included The Dowager Duchess of Roxburge, The Duchess of St Albans, The Duchess of Marlborough, Countess Torby, The Marchioness of Linlithgow, Lady Chelmsford, The Hon Mrs Keppell, Viscountess Strathallan, Lady Gwendoline Churchill, and Clementine Churchill.

George and Sybil had two children:

- James Anthony Butler, Viscount Thurles (1916–1940), died unmarried serving in Second World War as Driver, Royal Army Service Corps
- Lady Moyra Butler (1920–1959) married (1) Charles Weld-Forester and (2) Count Guy van den Steen de Jehay.
  - Piers Weld-Forester (1946 - 1977)
  - Gerard van den Steen (1949 - 1985) (m. Patricia Delloye)
    - Moyra van den Steen
    - Ségolène van den Steen
    - Géraldine van den Steen

=== Marriage Settlement ===
Surviving copies of George and Sybil’s respective marriage settlements held by the National Library of Ireland detail the financial provisions of their marriage. George’s mother settled £23,000 on the couple, from which they would be paid £1,100 annually. Sybil’s parents settled the income from £8,000 on the couple, the full amount of which would be payable upon Lord and Lady de Ramsay’s deaths. £6,000 of Sybil’s settlement was the be sourced from a fifth-share of Lady de Ramsay’s £30,000 marriage settlement, whilst the other £2,000 would be funded from her father’s estate.

Surviving records in the Huntingdon Archives suggest that Sybil surrendered her revisionary rights to her £8,000 in 1920; however following her father’s death in 1925 his Will provided for her settlement to be increased to £17,500. In 1929 George’s mother also added a further £15,000 to George’s marriage settlement, bringing the total amount of capital held in the marriage settlement trust to £55,500.

Sybil and George initially made their home at No. 2 Gloucester Place in London. 18 months after their wedding their first child James Anthony Butler was born at this address. George served with his regiment for the remainder of the First World War.

== Countess of Ossory ==
In 1919 George’s Uncle Lord Ormonde died; Sybil’s father and mother-in-law became the Marquess and Marchioness of Ormonde. George and Sybil took the family’s courtesy titles Earl and Countess of Ossory, and their son Anthony became entitled to use the courtesy title Viscount Thurles. Although Sybil's father-in-law had inherited the Ormonde peerages, the terms of the late Lord Ormonde’s Will bequeathed a life interest in the Ormonde Settled Estates Trust to George.

Surviving records show that the 4th Marquess being passed over in his inheritance was a deliberate act initiated by Lord Arthur. In 1916, in the months prior to birth of George and Sybil's son, the 3rd Marquess wrote to his nephew George, informing him that his father had requested to be passed over for the inheritance of the Ormonde Estates in favour of George, any future sons of George, and George’s younger brother, also called Arthur.

This decision has been attributed to a desire to avoid inheritance taxes being levied on the Ormonde estates on the deaths of both the 3rd and 4th Marquess before passing to ‘the next’ generation. Although there was only a five year age-gap between the 3rd and 4th Marquess, it later transpired that the 4th Marquess outlived his older brother by twenty-four years, whilst the 5th Marquess would outlive his father by only six years.

Consequently George and Sybil came into possession of a fortune of some £450,000; however the drastic increases in the rates of Estate Tax resulting from the First World War meant that approximately £160,000 was deducted from this inheritance. The new Lord and Lady Ossory took up residence at the family’s ancestral seat, Kilkenny Castle, in 1920.

=== 1920s ===
In 1920 Lord and Lady Ossory moved from No. 2 to No. 19 Gloucester Place. Sybil remained close to her own family. In May 1931 a large sale of the valuable contents of one of her childhood homes, Ramsey Abbey, was held at the behest of her nephew, the 3rd Baron de Ramsey. In May 1939 newspapers reported that her older sister Hermione, Baroness Cederstrom was in residence at their childhood home, Haveringland Hall, Norfolk, where she was visited by Sybil and George.

Surviving records from the 1926 Irish Free State census show that in 1926 Lord and Lady Ossory employed ten servants who also lived at Kilkenny Castle, including a housekeeper, cook, three housemaids, one kitchen maid, a lady's maid, dairy maid, gate lodge keeper, and another male whose role was listed as an unspecified domestic servant (likely a Butler). Lord Ossory also employed chauffeur, motor driver, head gardener and three gardeners who lived in nearby buildings situated on The Parade in Kilkenny City.

==== 1922 Siege of Kilkenny Castle ====
During the broader slide towards civil war in spring 1922, Kilkenny Castle was briefly occupied by anti-Treaty Irish Republican Army (“Irregular”) forces before being retaken by Pro-Treaty (“Free State”) troops whilst Lord and Lady Ossory were in residence. On 28 April 1922, Irregulars seized key buildings in Kilkenny and by the morning of 2 May a detachment of twenty-two had entered the castle courtyard and ordered Lord Ossory and his household to evacuate. Ossory refused, sheltering with his staff inside the castle while Free State reinforcements—some two hundred soldiers transported from Dublin and supported by an armoured car—began isolating and bombarding the anti-Treaty positions. Sporadic sniper fire and exchanges around high points such as St Canice’s tower continued through 2–3 May until the armoured car breached the main gate on the evening of 3 May, precipitating the surrender of the Irregulars. Remarkably, no fatalities were recorded, though property damage within the castle was later estimated at nearly £1,000. In his diary Ossory recalled his decision to remain—to prevent looting and destruction—and noted the unusually cordial treatment of the captured Irregulars, who were released on 5 May and entertained by local officers before dispersing to other anti-Treaty units.

In January 1928, Sybil, then styled Countess of Ossory, travelled to the United States, an event noted in the London press at the time.

=== 1930s ===
==== Closure of Kilkenny Castle ====
Lord and Lady Ossory closed Kilkenny Castle in 1935 and resided mostly in London. The contents of the castle were sold in 1935 and the castle was left neglected; the family's shooting lodge Ballyknockane Lodge, Tipperary became the Ossory's Irish residence. The Ormonde Estates had been in gradual financial decline since the late 1800s; whilst income had been as high as approximately £45,000 in the 1890s, this had fallen to approximately £9,000 in 1930. A number of family charges also drained the falling income of the estate; between 1919 and 1927, this averaged between £2,500 and £4,500. The Will of the 3rd Marquess made provision for £3,000 respective annual charges for his widow, Elizabeth, Marchioness of Ormonde, and his brother the 4th Marquess, as well as a £275 for his younger brother Lord Theobald Butler, which was also payable to Lord Theobald's wife Annabella in the event of his death. The cost of maintaining Kilkenny Castle also put a strain on finances; in 1904 this amount was some £4,400, but this had fallen to £2,166 in the 1920s, and approximately £1,200 in the early 1930s. Lord Ossory's decision to vacate the Castle in the mid-1930s reflects the family's difficults in maintaining such a large house.

==== Life in London ====
In 1939 Lord and Lady Ossory were recorded as living in inner-northern London at 30 St John's Wood Park. Despite the reduced circumstances of the family, a Butler, Cook, Housemaid, Kitchenmaid, and Lady's Maid were also recorded as living at this address.

Sybil presented her daughter Lady Moyra Butler at Court in May 1938. Lord and Lady Ossory hosted a large ball at the London townhouse of the Marquess and Marchioness of Ormonde, 11 Bryanston Square, in June 1938 during Lady Moyra's debutant season. This dance was a joint coming-of-age party for the Ossory's Viscount Thurles, as well as a debutant 'coming-out' party for Moyra. The guest list reported in newspapers at the time includes multiple prominent individuals from British and American High Society during the late 1930s, including American Ambassador Joseph Kennedy, Kathleen Kennedy, the-then Mistress of the Robes the Duchess of Northumberland, Lord Carisbrooke, Lady Iris Mountbatten, Clarissa Churchill, the Earl Spencer and The Hon. Pamela Digby.

== Marchioness of Ormonde ==
Following the death of Sybil's father-in-law Arthur Butler, 4th Marquess of Ormonde in 1943, Sybil's husband succeeded as the 5th Marquess of Ormonde, and she became the Marchioness of Ormonde.

=== Second World War ===
The Ormondes continued to maintain a social presence in London during the War; surviving newspaper records list a range of social functions such as a lunch hosted at the Chinese Embassy on 29 November 1944 at which both Lord and Lady Ormonde were present.

=== Later life and death ===
Sybil’s final years were marred by a series of family tragedies. Just over a week after her daughter’s marriage, Sybil’s only son Anthony, Viscount Thurles died of pneumonia at the nursing home on the Isle of Wright. In the months which followed, her new son-in-law Lt Charles Weld-Forester was captured during the defence of Calais. He was later interred with other high-profile prisoners of war at Colditz, and would not be released until 1945.

In 1946 she welcomed the birth of her first grandchild Piers Edric Weld-Forester, though in the following year newspapers announced that her son-in-law was suing her daughter Moyra for divorce on grounds of adultery.

In late 1946 her childhood home, Haveringland Hall in Norfolk, was offered for sale by her nephew, the 3rd Baron de Ramsey. Sybil was amongst members of a crowd injured at a film premiere on 1 November 1946 in London. Lady Moyra’s divorce was followed by her re-marriage to the man cited as a co-respondent in the divorce, Belgian nobleman Count Guy van den Steen de Jehay.

Sybil died in a London nursing home on Tuesday 18 May 1948, following an operation at the age of 59. Her funeral was held on Friday 21 May 1948 at St Mark’s, North Audley Street in London, and was attended by members of the extended Butler and Fellowes Families, although newspaper noted that her mother-in-law Ellen, Dowager Marchioness of Ormonde was "unavoidably prevented from attending". A memorial service was also held at St Canice’s Cathedral, Kilkenny on the same day. Sybil’s Will was proved at £6,700 in Ireland.

== Titles ==
- 1888 - 1915: The Honourable Sybil Fellowes
- 1915 - 1919: The Honourable Mrs George Butler
- 1919 - 1943: Countess of Ossory
- 1943 - 1948: The Most Honourable Marchioness of Ormonde
