= Ellen Stager =

American heiress and British peeress

The Most Honourable The Marchioness of Ormonde
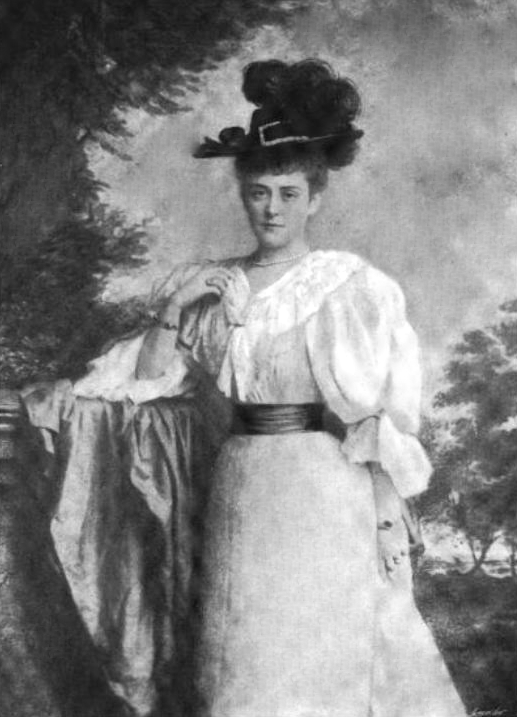
- In The Sketch, 27 November 1901
- Born: Ellen Sprague Stager; 26 May 1865; Chicago, Illinois, US
- Died: 17 June 1951 (aged 86)
- Buried: All Saints Churchyard
- Noble family: Butler (by marriage)
- Spouse: Arthur Butler, 4th Marquess of Ormonde
- Issue: Lady Evelyn Frances Butler; George Butler, 5th Marquess of Ormonde; Arthur Butler, 6th Marquess of Ormonde; Lady Eleanor Rachel Butler
- Father: General Anson Stager
- Mother: Rebecca Sprague

Ellen Sprague Butler, Marchioness of Ormonde (née Stager; 26 May 1865 – 17 June 1951) was an American heiress and British peeress who was the daughter of General Anson Stager. In 1887 she married Lord Arthur Butler, younger brother of James Butler, 3rd Marquess of Ormonde, who became the 4th Marquess of Ormonde in 1919. Ellen held the title Marchioness of Ormonde from 1919 until her husband's death in 1943. She was the mother of George Butler, 5th Marquess of Ormonde and Arthur Butler, 6th Marquess of Ormonde.

== Early life ==
Ellen was born in Chicago on 26 May 1865 to General Anson Stager and Rebecca Stager (née Sprague). At the time of her birth the Stager family included her older sisters Louise and Annie, aged 16 and 14, as well as an older brother Charles, aged 5, who died two years after Ellen's birth in 1867. Anson Stager was a self-made millionaire, who started his career as an apprentice on the Rochester Daily Advertiser. He later found work as a telegraph operator, and received a series of promotions throughout the 1840s and 50s which culminated in his appointment as the first general superintendent of the Western Union Company in 1856. During the American Civil War Stager was asked by Governor Dennison of Ohio to manage telegraphs in Ohio and along the Virginia Line, which led to a later appointment as head of the Military Telegraph Department in Washington. He accompanied General McClellan during the West Virginia Campaign, and was credited with establishing the first system of field telegraphs during the Civil War. Stager retained his civilian status during the war, and in 1868 he was made a brevet brigadier general of volunteers.

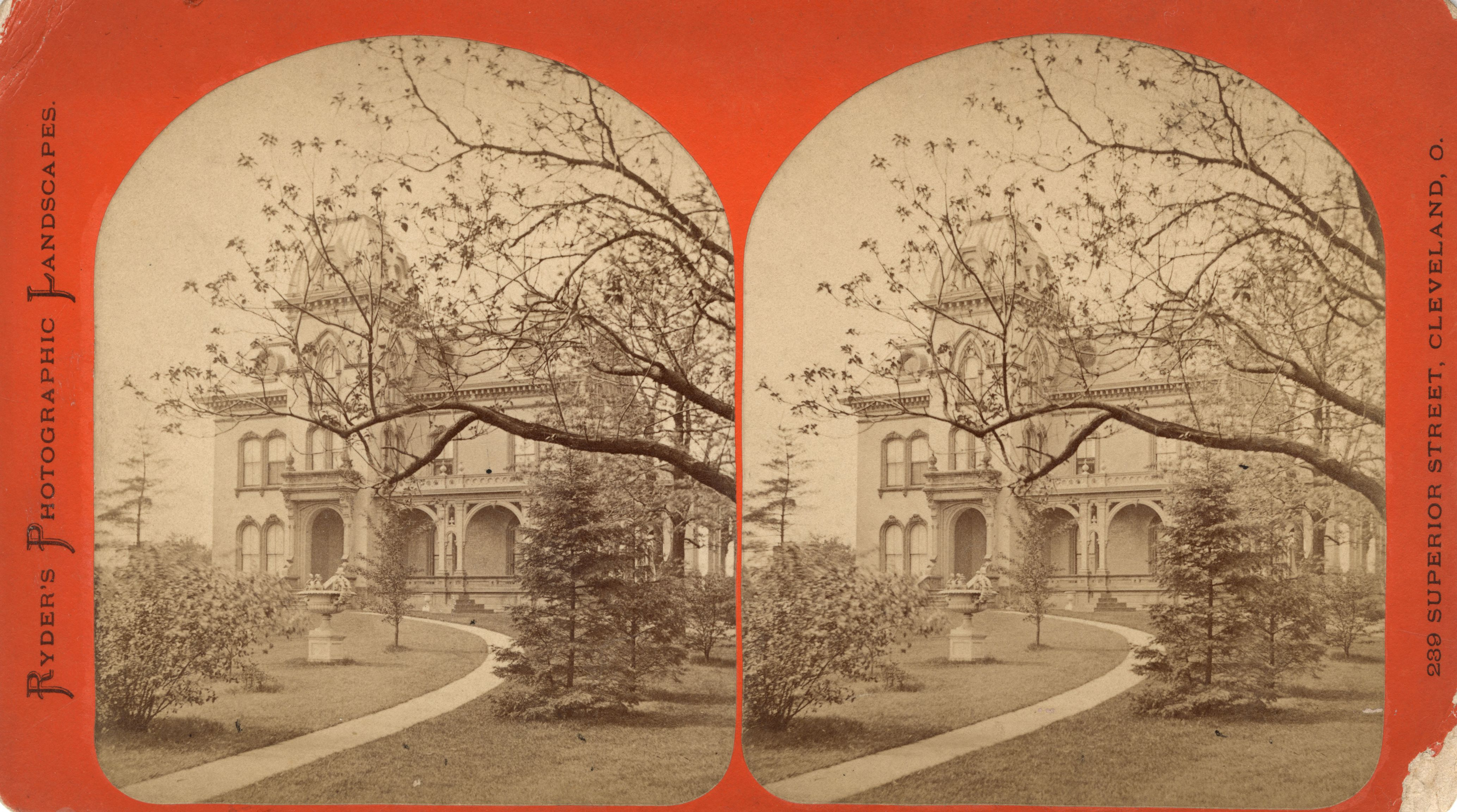
The Stager-Beckwith House in Ohio, Ellen's family home from 1866 to 1869

During the first year's of Ellen's life the Stager family lived in Cleveland, Ohio at No. 3813 Euclid Avenue, then known as Millionaire's Row. Her father spent approximately $60,000 on the construction of a large house which still stands today, known as the Stager-Beckwith House. The House was sold in 1869 and the family moved to Chicago, where General Stager served as president of Western Electric, and later President of the Chicago Telephone Company and Western Edison Company. Stager had several business interests with "Commodore" Cornelius Vanderbilt I, who was widely regarded as the richest man in the world at the time. Contemporary sources describe Stager as the "Chief Representative of Vanderbilt Interests in the Mid-West". His time as President (and co-director) of Western Edison Light Co. overlapped with Thomas Edison's tenure as one of the company's directors.

In 1879, the Stagers were recorded as living at 672 Michigan Avenue, Chicago. In 1880 Stager constructed a new home for approximately $150,000 on the corner of Michigan Avenue and Eighteenth Street in Chicago; this was reputed to be the first private home in the city to be lit with electricity. The building was erected on the former site of the Calumet Club, of which Stager had previously been president. The house was later sold in 1887 to William B. Howard.

Ellen's mother, Rebecca Sprague Stager died on 22 October 1883. She left an estate valued at $15,000, which included $12,000 worth of real estate in Cleveland, Ohio. Anson Stager died on 26 March 1885. His funeral was held at his home at 1785 Michigan Avenue, Chicago on 28 March 1995; one of his pallbearers was Robert Todd Lincoln, the former US Secretary of War and son of President Abraham Lincoln.

Anson Stager's estate was valued at approximately $850,000, including $125,000 of real estate and $725,000 of personal estate, which was shared equally between Ellen and her two older sisters Annie Stager Hickox and Louise Stager Gorton.

== Marriage and family ==
In 1885, accompanied by her sister Annie Stager Hickox, Ellen departed the United States to visit Great Britain and Europe. She was presented to Queen Victoria at Court, and at a ball given in her honour she met Lord Arthur Butler, younger brother and heir presumptive of the Marquess of Ormonde. In the winter of 1885-86 she visited Pisa in Italy and Nice in France, and later visited Rome. She later visited the Ormonde Family Seat Kilkenny Castle in Ireland in 1886, and it was speculated at the time that this is where she became engaged to Lord Arthur.

Lord Arthur Butler had been born the third son of John Butler, 2nd Marquess of Ormonde, and was 16 years older than Ellen. The death of his older brother Lord Hubert Butler in 1867 had elevated him to the position of heir presumptive to his older brother Lord Ormonde. Lord Ormonde had married Lady Elizabeth Grosvenor, but in the decade which elapsed between Lord Ormonde's marriage and Lord Arthur's engagement, Lord Ormonde had fathered two daughters, but no son to succeed to the family titles and honours. Consequently, by the time Ellen and Lord Arthur met the prospect of his eventual succession to the Marquessate of Ormonde, along with its 22,000 acres in Ireland and Kilkenny Castle had come to be regarded as increasingly likely.

Ellen and Lord Arthur were married on 8 March 1887 at St George's Church in Hanover Square, London. She was given away by her brother-in-law, Ralph Hickox, and Lord Arthur's younger brother Lord Theobald Butler officiated the ceremony. A Wedding Breakfast was hosted by Viscountess Maidstone (who was reported to be a friend of Ellen's) at her home at 17 Queen St, Mayfair. Arthur and Ellen honeymooned at Latimer House, Buckinghamshire, which was the home of Charles Cavendish, 3rd Baron Chesham. Lord Chesham's wife was a sister of Ellen's new sister-in-law, Elizabeth, Marchioness of Ormonde.

Arthur and Ellen had four children:

- Lady Evelyn Frances Butler (20 December 1887 – 15 April 1978), married with Vice-Adm. Hon. Edmund Rupert Drummond, CB MVO RN (ret.), son of 10th Viscount Strathallan and brother of 15th Earl of Perth.
  - Anne Drummond (born 30 June 1911)
  - Jean Constance Drummond (born 20 August 1914)
  - James Ralph Drummond (1918 - 1944) (presumed dead following the disappearance of HMS Sickle)
- James George Anson Butler, 5th Marquess of Ormonde (1890–1949), married The Hon Sybil Fellowes in 1915, daughter of William Fellowes, 2nd Baron de Ramsey and Lady Rosamond Churchill.
  - James Anthony Butler, Viscount Thurles (1916 - 1940)
  - Lady Moyra Rosamund Butler (1920 - 1959) m1. Charles Weld-Forester m2. Comte Guy van den Steen de Jehay
- James Arthur Norman Butler, 6th Marquess of Ormonde (1893–1971)
  - Lady Jane Butler (1925 - 1992)
  - Lady Martha Butler (1926 - 2010) m. Sir Ashley Ponsonby, 2nd Bt
- Lady Eleanor Rachel Butler (1894–1969), married firstly Captain Edward Brassey Egerton (1889 - 1916), eldest son of Charles Augustus Egerton of Mountfield Court, Sussex (who was a son of Politician Edward Egerton M.P.) and Lady Mabelle Brassey CBE, daughter of Thomas Brassey, 1st Earl Brassey. Capt. Egerton died during the First World War. In later life Lady Rachel married clergyman William Henry Prior.

== Dowry and personal fortune ==
Estimates of Ellen's dowry and fortune have varied between contemporary and modern sources; rumours of her $1,000,000 (£200,000) fortune at the time of her marriage in 1887 were likely inaccurate (the actual figure being closer to $280,000, or £56,000). However, by 1929 growths in investments, as well as the deaths of her two childless, widowed older sisters, resulted in her fortune likely being closer to $1,500,000 (£300,000) in value.

In the lead-up to Ellen's marriage to Lord Arthur Butler in 1887, newspapers on both sides of the Atlantic reported that Ellen bought a personal fortune of $1,000,000 (£200,000) to her marriage, and her name often appeared in newspaper articles listing various American heiresses who had married British and European aristocrats. A conservative estimate of the income derived from a fortune of this size would be £8,000 to £10,000. In contrast, estate papers indicate that Lord Arthur received a £500 annual allowance from his brother Lord Ormonde. Modern sources also record Ellen's fortune as ranging between $1,000,000 to $1,500,000.

However the fortune which Ellen's father had left to his three daughters was closer in value to $850,000 to $900,000 in the mid-1880's (or £170,000 to £180,000 per the exchange rate of $5:£1). The Stager Fortune was left in equal shares to General Stager's three daughters; thus Ellen's actual fortune was likely closer in value to $300,000, or £60,000. The terms of her father's Will provided that she would receive 25% of her inheritance outright on her 21st Birthday, but the remainder would be held in a Trust from which Ellen would only enjoy the income. A further 25% would vest into her absolute ownership on her 30th birthday, with the remaining 50% vesting on her 40th birthday. Consequently, at the time of her marriage the value of the fortune which Ellen possess was closer in value to $75,000 (£15,000), and an annual income in the region of £2,500.

In 1895 The Inter Ocean newspaper reported that Anson Stager had left an estate with a net personality of $800,000 and realty of $200,000, the significant assets of which included $262,000 of stock in the Michigan Telephone Company, $60,000 of stock in the Cleveland Rolling Mill Company and $60,000 of stock in the Union Steel Company. Ellen's share of such an amount would be approximately $333,000 (£66,000).

In 1897 the Chicago Tribune reported that Ellen enjoyed a $20,000 (£4,000) annual income from a $500,000 (£100,000) share in her father's estate, which included shares in the Chicago and other telephone companies.

=== 1915: Marriage settlement of George Butler and The Hon Sybil Fellowes ===
In 1915 Ellen provided £23,000 ($115,000) as part of the marriage settlement of her elder son Capt. George Butler and his fiancée The Hon Sybil Fellowes, which was to pay the couple an annuity of £1,100 during Ellen's lifetime, or £600 for life to Sybil if George predeceased her.

$115,000 would comprise almost half of the portion of Anson Stager's estate which Ellen inherited. Therefore, it is highly likely that the value of shares and other assets which formed part of Anson Stager's estate experienced significant growth between 1885 and 1915.

Ellen settled a further £15,000 on George and Sybil (by then known as the Earl and Countess of Ossory) in 1929, which was supplemental to the original marriage settlement, and provided for an additional annual payment of £400 to Sybil, Countess of Ossory, in the event of George predeceasing her.

=== 1922–1923: Estates of Annie Stager Hickox and Louise Stager Gorton ===
In addition to her own share of her father's estate, Ellen's fortune increased significantly in 1922 and 1923 following the deaths of her sisters Annie Stager Hickox and Louise Stager Gorton, who both died as childless widows.

In February 1922, Annie Stager Hickox died in Monte Carlo, Monaco, leaving an estate valued at $847,207. Much of her fortune was left to Ellen and her children. The New York Times reported that Hickox left:

- Half of the residuary Estate to Ellen
- $250,000 in a Trust Fund for Louise Stager Gorton, with the Principal to go to Ellen
- $25,000 to Louise Stager Gorton
- $5,000 to Ellen's husband Arthur
- $5,000 to Ellen's elder daughter Lady Evelyn Drummond
- $5,000 to Ellen's elder son, George Butler, Earl of Ossory
- $5,000 to Ellen's younger son, Lord James Arthur Norman Butler

When adjusted for inflation, the 1922 value of Annie Stager Hickox's estate would have been approximately $490,000 in 1885, the year her father Anson Stager died; this represents a significant increase to the estimated value of her third share of his $850,000 estate ($283,000).

Surviving records relating to the administration of her older sisters' estate indicate that approximately $750,000 of Hickox's estate was held in Trust, with clear provisions relating to the distribution of the Estate upon her death. These include the above-mentioned bequests to Ellen and her children, but with the entirely of the residuary estate to be bequeathed to Ellen. Despite this, orders made in the New York County Surrogate's Court on 25 June 1923 indicate that the $457,000 residuary estate was split equally between Ellen and Louise Stager Gorton. Gorton died merely weeks after this Order was made on 15 August 1923, and her estate was appraised at approximately $37,000, with the residuary estate being split equally between Ellen's four children, who received approximately $7,500 (£1,500) each after estate taxes were levied.

=== 1925: Tax payable in America ===
American newspapers reported that the "estate of the Marchioness of Ormonde" paid $2,313.63 in federal income tax in 1925, indicating that the taxable income was approximately $30,000, which would equate to approximately £6,200 in 1925. Details of Ellen's Trust arrangements contained in the Ormonde v Brown 1932 English Tax Law Case confirm that following the 1922 resettlement of Ellen's American Assets, the income from her Trusts would be paid to Ellen and her husband Arthur in equal shares. Consequently, the combined $60,000 income of the couple in 1925 suggests the value of Ellen's American Fortune had grown to approximately $1,200,000 by the mid-1920's (not inclusive of the funds she had already settled in her children's respective marriage settlements).

=== 1922–1932: Trust distributions ===
In 1932 Ellen successfully appealed an early 1930s ruling of the British Commissioners for Taxation; the appeal case, Ormonde (Marchioness) v Brown (HM Inspector of Taxes), centred on the extent to which the income Ellen received from her Ohio-based Trust was assessable for income tax in the United Kingdom, and was heard the Court of the King's Bench. The details of the case, preserved in the Tax Cases Law Reports provide a detailed insight into how Ellen structured her American Wealth throughout the 1920s and early 1930s.

In late December 1923, £16,000 was set aside within Ellen's American Trusts for the payment of an annuity to her second son Lord James Arthur Norman Butler; this was likely in anticipation of his impending wedding in January 1924, with the full amount to be paid to Arthur upon Ellen's death. Based on the proportion of the annual income her elder son received from his marriage settlement in 1915 (£1,100 p.a. from £23,000), this would have generated an annual income of approximately £760 for Arthur. A further £5,000 was added to this amount in October 1924, increasing Lord Arthur's annual income to approximately £1,000. During the 1920s, several minor annuities to American-based cousins, as well as larger annuities to three of Ellen's four children were paid from the Trust's annual income, with the remaining net income paid in equal shares to Ellen and her husband Arthur Butler, 4th Marquess of Ormonde.

In March and May 1928 the provisions providing for the payment of an annual allowance to Lord Arthur were revoked, and the full respective amounts were made as immediate payments of £16,000 and £5,000 Lord Arthur.

The various American Trust instruments were transferred to the Cleveland Trust Company of Ohio on 25 April 1929, and the re-ordered Trusts included provisions of the payment of Annuities of £6,000 each to Ellen and her husband Arthur for their respective lives. The initial tax appeal which was heard before the St. Marylebone District Commissioners of Taxation in December 1931 noted that the taxable income from Foreign Possessions and Securities of Arthur and Ellen was £16,000 during the 1929-30 Tax Year.

Ellen also withdrew £4,000 in July 1930 to be applied to the marriage settlement of her granddaughter. These dates coincide with the marriage of Lady Evelyn's daughter Anne Drummond. The Cleveland Trust Company continued to be the Trustee of Ellen's American Fortune throughout the 1930s, with newspapers reporting that the Company held 1,034 shares for Ellen in the Continental Illinois Bank in January 1936 (valued at $121.50 each, or $125,631 in total). Ellen's husband Arthur also received a $813.70 processing tax refund through the Cleveland Trust Co in Ohio in early 1937.

=== 1951: Probate in England ===
Following her death, the Gross Value of Ellen's Estate in England was valued at £61,700. Based on the 1951 exchange rate of $2.80:£1, the value in U.S. dollars would be approximately $172,000. This represents a fraction of Ellen's estimated $1,500,000 fortune in the early 1930s; few if any records survive of any probate or estate administration applications relating to any existing fortune in America which Ellen possessed at the time of her death.

== Life in England and residences ==
=== London residences ===
From December 1887 to at least 1895, Lord and Lady Arthur Butler were recorded as living at 21 Park Lane, City of Westminster, London. Ellen's elder daughter Evelyn, and two sons George and Arthur were born at this address in 1887, 1890 and 1893 respectively. 21 Park Lane had been the residence of Ellen's mother-in-law Frances, Dowager Marchioness of Ormonde, since at least 1877, until at least 1898.

Following their departure from Sandleford Priory, Arthur and Ellen took a temporary residence at 71 Cadogan Square, London in 1898. Surviving newspaper records indicate that their London Residence was 7 Portman Square from early 1900 until at least February 1925. Records from the Portman Estate Archive show that a six-year lease of 7 Portman Square was acquired by Lord Arthur Butler in August 1899, for an annual ground rent of £300. This lease was renewed for 18 years at a cost of £2,000, and an ongoing ground rent of £300. Lord Ormonde surrendered the lease in September 1924.

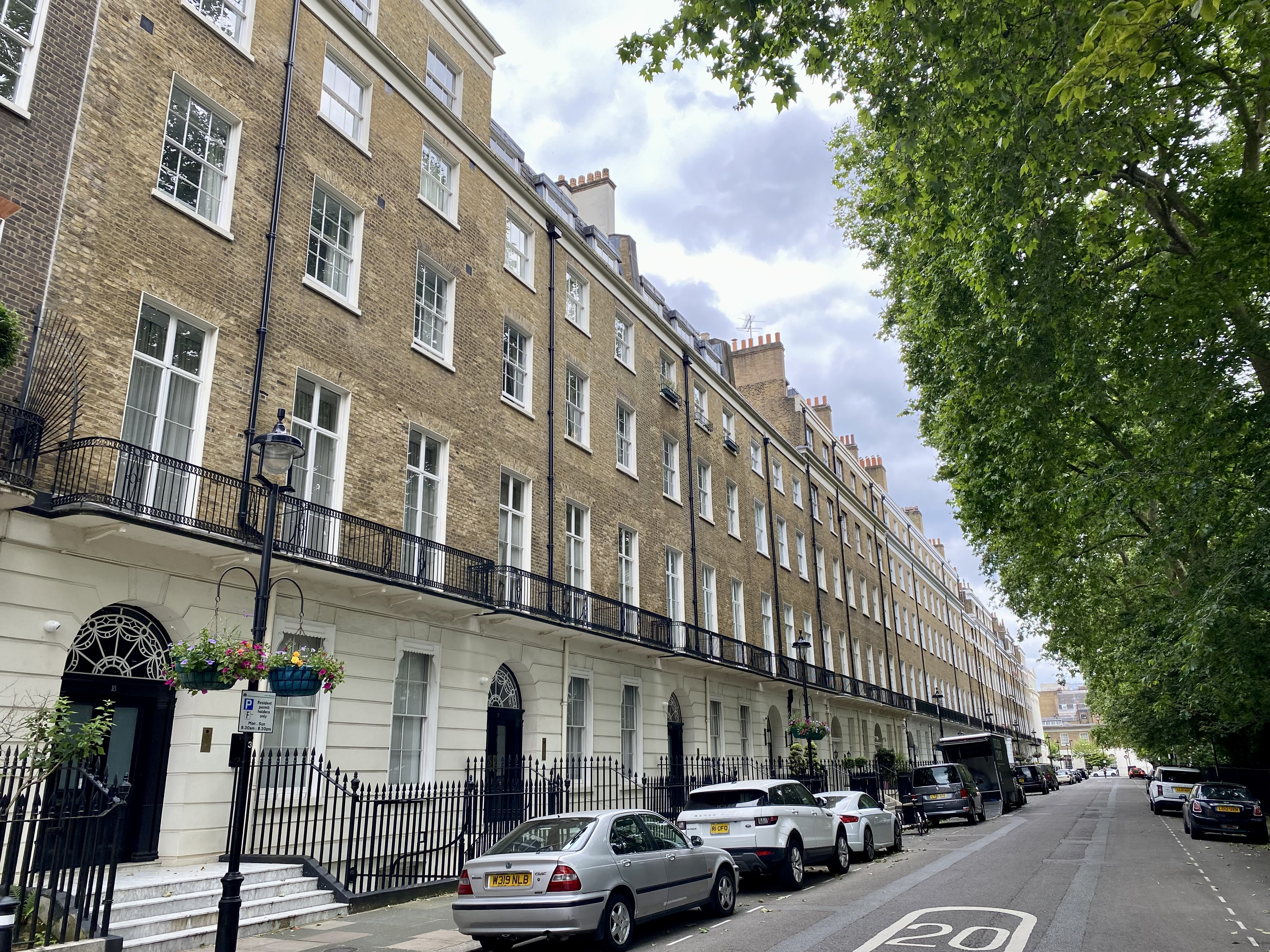
The eastern row of Bryanston Square, London, No.11 sits at the centre, and was Ellen's London home from 1925 to c. 1940

On 4 November 1925 it was reported that Lord and Lady Ormonde had taken a long lease of a much larger house at No. 11 Bryanston Square. 11 Bryanston Square remained as their London home until at least 1938.

The lease over 11 Bryanston Square was renewed for a thirty-six year period from 25 March 1939 for £3,750 and an annual ground rent of £250; however by 1943 the house had been sub-let. The lease was terminated in 1956; Ellen's Executors received £4,500 for the early release.

By the time of Arthur's death in 1943, the Ormondes had vacated No. 11 Bryanston Square. By August 1945 the house, along with several neighbouring properties on the western side of Bryanston Square, was occupied by the United States Strategic Air Forces (Rear) Headquarters.

Second-World-War bombing has also left parts of Bryanston Square in need of extensive repair. A local report in March 1946 noted that several houses on the east side, including No. 11, were still awaiting reinstatement under the War Damage Commission scheme. Estate papers held at the National Archives record the post-war repairs carried out to Nos 10–12.

=== Country residences ===
The first record of Ellen and Arthur maintaining a country residence is at Sandleford Priory, near Newbury, from at least 1895 to September 1898.

In the 1901 UK Census, Lord and Lady Arthur Butler were recorded as living in Willesley House near Cranbrook in Kent, with their younger son Arthur and daughters Evelyn and Rachel, and a household of 14 servants, including a Governess, Butler, Cook, two Footmen, a Kitchenmaid, Nurse, and three Housemaids living in the House, and two grooms, a coachman and hall boy living in various outbuildings.

In 1901 Ellen purchased the Gennings Park in Kent, which would be her home for the following fifty years until her death in 1951. The purchase of country estate of their own by Lord and Lady Arthur Butler, after fourteen years of marriage, was reportedly made following the death of Lord Arthur's cousin George O'Callaghan, 2nd Viscount Lismore in 1899; Lord Lismore had reportedly informed his family that, following the deaths of his two sons, Lord Arthur Butler would be the heir to his estates (47,000 acres in Ireland centred on Shanbally Castle worth £18,435 annually). Following Lord Lismore's death in 1898, his Will revealed that he had instead named Lord Arthur's nieces Lady Beatrice and Lady Constance Butler as the beneficiaries of his estate.

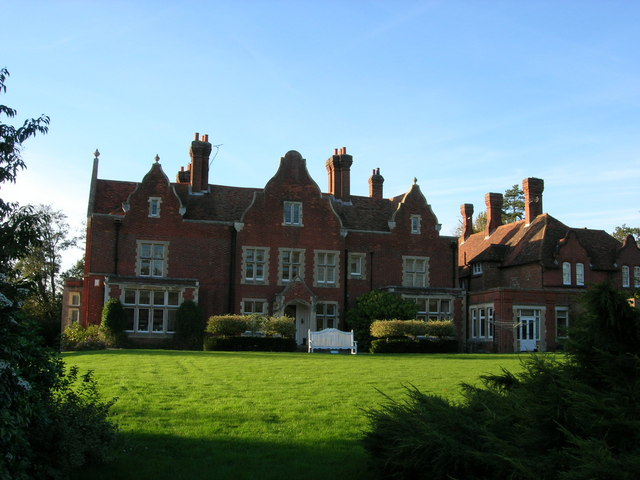
Gennings Park, Ellen's country home from 1901 until her death in 1951; the House was later sold by her son Arthur Butler, 6th Marquess of Ormonde in 1955

The Gennings Park Estate was later sold by Ellen's second son Arthur, 6th Marquess of Ormonde in 1955.

The 1911 Census records Lord Arthur as visiting his daughter Lady Evelyn Drummond in Hove, Sussex. Lady Evelyn and her husband Lt. Drummond kept a staff of four servants in their household - a Lady's Maid, Cook, Housemaid and Footman. In contrast, the 1911 census records that a staff of 11 lived at Gennings Park, including a Housekeeper, Kitchenmaid, Scullery Maid, three Housemaids, one Footman, one Under Footman, a Coachman, Groom and Chauffeur.

According to the 1921 UK Census, Lord and Lady Ormonde's (as Ellen and Arthur were known from 1919) household at Gennings, Kent employed 13 servants, including a Butler, Footman, Pantry boy, Cook, Kitchen Maid, Scullery Maid, Nursemaid, three Housemaids, Lady's Maid, Coachman and Chauffeur. A nurse and nursemaid, as well as their grandchildren James Anthony Butler, Viscount Thurles, and Lady Moyra Butler, were recorded as visitors.

In 1922, Lady Ormonde's sister Annie Stager Hickox died of pneumonia at her home "Villa Menesina" in Monte Carlo, Monaco. Hickox also had a home at 78 Avenue Malakoff in Paris.

The 1939 Register of England and Wales records that 11 servants were employed at Gennings Park in the Ormonde's Household, including a Housekeeper and Gardener. The house also hosted a number of evacuated schoolchildren and their schoolmaster. An "indoor" staff of eight servants was maintained during the 1940s, even after the death of Ellen's husband Arthur.

=== Travel ===
Lord and Lady Arthur Butler arrived with their daughter Evelyn in New York on 6 April 1892.

In 1904 Ellen, along with Arthur and their elder son George, were present when Lord and Lady Ormonde hosted King Edward VII and Queen Alexandra at Kilkenny Castle.

In 1910 Ellen and Arthur visited Lady Arthur's sister Louisa Gorton in Wheaton, Illinois. She also visited New York in November 1912, accompanied by her younger daughter Rachel.

In March 1926, Lord and Lady Ormonde, and their daughter Lady Rachel Egerton, sailed from London aboard the RMS Mooltan for Gibraltar, returning aboard the RMS Otranto (1925) in April 1926.

In February 1932, Lord and Lady Ormonde, accompanied by Lady Ormonde's maid Miss M.E. Chubb [Minnie Eva Chubb], departed London aboard the HMS Orford for Port Said, Egypt. They returned to London aboard the SS Oronsay in March 1932.

== Marchioness of Ormonde ==
Lord Arthur succeeded to the Marquessate of Ormonde upon the death of his older brother James Butler, 3rd Marquess of Ormonde in 1919. As per the will of the Third Marquess, Ellen and Arthur's son George Butler, 5th Marquess of Ormonde inherited the bulk of the family estates in order to avoid double taxation, with an annual charge of £3,000 on the Ormonde Estates was made in favor of Arthur.

The decision to bypass Arthur as the beneficiary of the family estates seems to have been at the bequest of Arthur himself. Records survive of a letter written by the Fourth Marquess to Arthur's son George Butler dated 27 June 1916 outlining changes to his will which "your father has asked me to alter" which postponed Lord Arthur's use of the Ormonde Estate in favor of George, George's sons (at the time George's wife Sybil was pregnant with their only son, Anthony Butler) and George's brother Arthur and his male issue. Within the letter Lord Ormonde outlined several requests pertaining to family property, including that:

(1) George not make any alteration of the family seat, Kilkenny Castle, and shooting lodge, Ballyknockane Lodge, Tipperary without consulting and obtaining the approval of Arthur;

(2) that Arthur would have use of Plate and other articles "as he shall desire"; and,

(3) that Ellen, during the lifetime of Lord Arthur, would have the use of any Family Jewels which Lord Ormonde had the power to dispose of.

The new Lord and Lady Ormonde continued to live at Gennings, and maintain their London residence at 7 Portman Square, and later 11 Bryanston Square, whilst Lord and Lady Ossory lived at Kilkenny Castle and leased various houses in London. Due to the declining estate income of the Ormonde Estates, wages rises and taxation increases, Lord Ossory made the decision to vacate Kilkenny Castle in 1935.

Whilst Kilkenny Castle remained as the family seat, the Ormonde's house at 11 Bryanston Square seems to have been the primary base in London for family events. The house loaned to Ellen's elder daughter, Lady Evelyn Drummond, for the wedding reception of her daughter Anne Drummond in July 1930. In June 1938 Lord and Lady Ormonde loaned their London residence to Lord and Lady Ossory for a large ball. This dance was a joint coming-of-age party for Ellen's grandson, Anthony Viscount Thurles, as well as a debutante 'coming-out' party for their granddaughter Lady Moyra Butler. The guest list reported in newspapers at the time includes multiple prominent individuals from British and American High Society during the late 1930s, including the American Ambassador Joseph P. Kennedy Sr. and his daughter Kathleen, Lord Carisbrooke, Viscount Curzon, the Earl FitzWilliam, the Earl Spencer, The Duke of Marlborough, the-then Mistress of the Robes Helen Percy, Duchess of Northumberland, Major the Hon John Jacob Astor, and The Hon Pamela Digby.

As Marchioness of Ormonde, Ellen played a prominent role in high society which was typical for British Peers' Wives in the 1920s and 30's, serving as President of the St Marylebone Conservative Association's Ball Committee in 1933, as well as being a member of the Board of the West Kent Hospital in 1936 and 1937. She was present at both the Coronation of King George V and Queen Mary in 1911, as well as the Coronation of George VI and Elizabeth in 1937, although her husband Lord Ormonde is not recorded as also being in attendance at the latter.

Ellen's long-serving Lady's Maid Minnie Eva Chubb died on 12 January 1939 at St Mary Abbots Hospital, London. Probate records indicate that her registered address was the Ormondes' townhouse at 11 Bryanston Square, London. Minnie had been in Ellen's employ for at least twenty-seven years, since accompanying Ellen on her visit to Ohio in 1912.

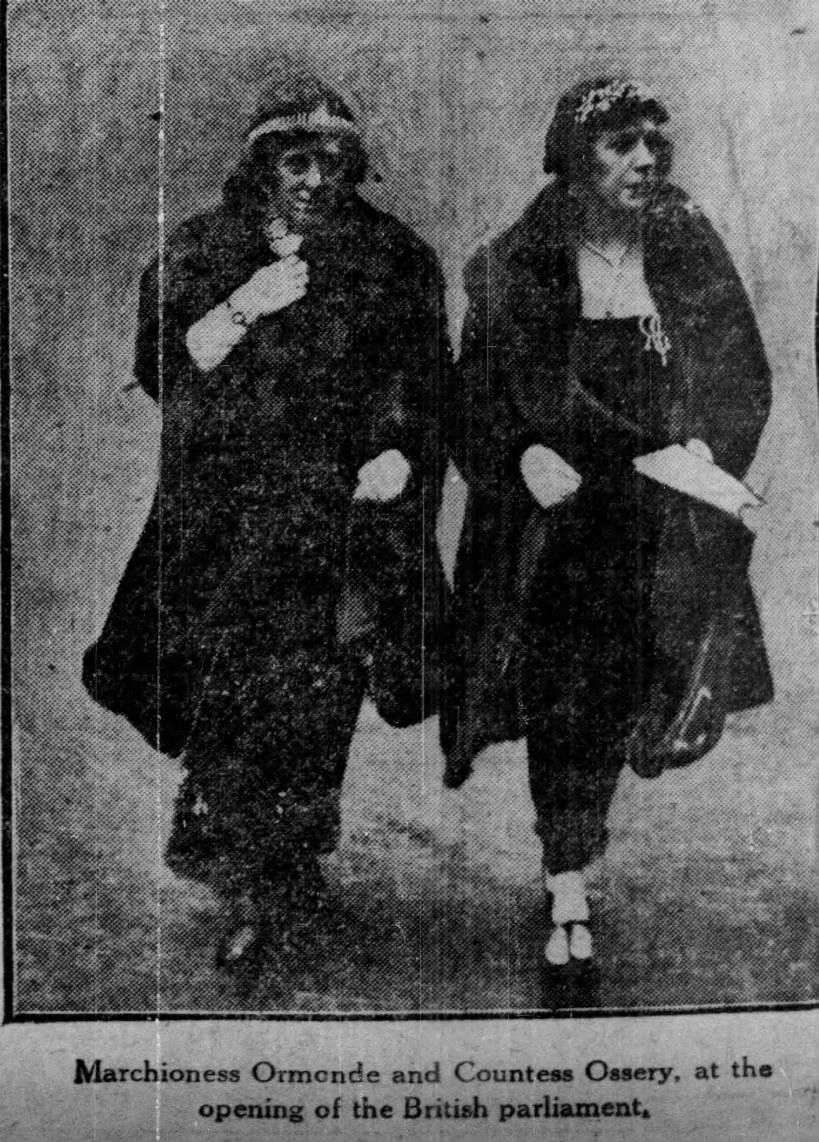
Ellen, Marchioness of Ormonde (left) with her daughter Sybil, Countess of Ossory at the State Opening of Parliament in London, December 1922.

== Taxation court case ==
Ellen was the appellant in a court case which was ultimately heard before Lord Finlay in the King's Bench Division of the English Court of Appeal. The case, Ormonde (Marchioness) v Brown (Inspector of Taxes) (1932) 17 TC 333, involved the taxation of income from a Foreign Trust in the United Kingdom.

Details of the judgement noted that Lady Ormonde had placed her American securities into an Ohio trust in 1922, reserving a power to revoke the Trust. In 1929 she exercised that power and settled the assets on a new American corporate trustee, The Cleveland Trust Company of Ohio. The deed charged small life-annuities on the fund to several of Ellen's American Cousins, three of her children, and provided for life annuities of £6,000 each to be paid to Ellen and her husband Lord Ormonde. Under the terms of the Trust, Lady Ormonde retained a power to revoke the Trust, but any change that harmed the annuitants required their written consent.

The British Inland Revenue assessed Lady Ormonde on the whole of the dividends “arising” abroad under Rule 1 of Case V, Schedule D, arguing that section 20 of the Finance Act 1922 treated the whole of the trust income as Lady Ormonde's income for taxation purposes because she could recall the settlement. Lady Ormonde's appeal asserted that she should only pay tax on the £6,000 annuity which she was paid from the Trust. Finlay J disagreed with the Inland Revenue's case, finding in Lady Ormonde's favour. He stressed that section 20 was not itself a charging provision; it could only shift liability where the income was already within the territorial scope of U.K. tax. Because, under Ohio law, the trustee—not Lady Ormonde—owned the shares, the dividends lay outside that scope unless and until they were actually remitted to Britain. Accordingly, Lady Ormonde was taxable only on money she chose to bring to the United Kingdom, under Rule 2 (the remittance basis).

The ruling exposed a gap in the remittance rule: by routing investments through a non-resident trustee, a U.K. settlor could postpone or avoid tax on overseas income. This principal was examined by the House of Lords in the 1935 Case Perry v Astor, involving a New York trust without any consent restriction. The Court of Appeal sided with the Revenue, but on appeal the House of Lords reversed that decision on 21 March 1935, which also confirmed Justice Finlay's ruling in Ormonde v Brown; the Lords found that section 20 could not “deem” into charge income that was, in territorial terms, outside the Acts.

For contemporary tax planners the combined effect of Ormonde v Brown and the Lords’ confirmation in Astor v Perry was clear: so long as a foreign trustee legally owned the assets, income stayed untaxed in Britain until remitted. The cases did not invent the remittance basis, but they showed how easily it could be utilised by wealthy residents like Lady Ormonde, whose American fortune remained largely sheltered from U.K. income tax while she lived in England.

== Dowager Marchioness of Ormonde ==
Arthur Butler, 4th Marquess of Ormonde died on 4 July 1943, and was succeeded as Marquess of Ormonde by his son George, Earl of Ossory. The 1940s saw a series of tragedies befall the Ormonde Family; Ellen's two grandsons Viscount Thurles and James Drummond died in 1940 and 1944 respectively, both whilst serving in the armed forces. Her daughter-in-law Sybil Butler, Marchioness of Ormonde died following an operation in 1948, and her elder son George, Marquess of Ormonde died in 1949. As he had been predeceased by his only son, Ellen's younger son Lord Arthur Butler succeeded him as the Sixth Marquess of Ormonde.

Ellen continued to live at Gennings Park for the remainder of her life; following her husband's death, their second son Lord Arthur Butler and his family relocated to Gennings in 1944 and lived with Ellen for the remainder of her life.

Following the end Second World War, Gennings Park continued to be run with a substantial indoor staff; surviving advertisements exist for a kitchen maid/assistant in September 1946, and, a year later, both a chauffeur (who would also help in the garden) and a head housemaid.

There is little evidence of Ellen maintaining a London residence after the outbreak of the Second World War; however she retained the 36-year 1939 Lease over 11 Bryanston Square. The House sustained significant bombing damage during the War; in 1953 the long-lease was repurchased from her executors by the Portman Estate for £4,500.

Ellen died in a Nursing Home on 17 June 1951; she was survived by her daughters Lady Evelyn Drummond and Lady Rachel Egerton, her son Lord Ormonde, and her granddaughters Anne Murray, Jean Finney, Comtesse Moyra van den Steen de Jehay, Lady Jane Heaton and Lady Martha Ponsonby.

== See also ==
- Butler dynasty

Peerage of Ireland
Preceded by Lady Elizabeth Harriet Grosvenor	Marchioness of Ormonde; 1919–1943	Succeeded by The Hon. Sybil Fellowes
