= Charles Butler, 7th Marquess of Ormonde =

British noble (1899–1997)

The Most Honourable James Hubert Theobald Charles Butler MBE
- Seventh Marquess of Ormonde

Marquess of Ormonde
- Tenure: 17 April 1971 – 25 October 1997
- Predecessor: Arthur Butler, 6th Marquess of Ormonde
- Successor: Extinct
- Born: 19 April 1899
- Died: 25 October 1997 (aged 98)
- Noble family: Butler dynasty
- Spouses: Nan Gilpin (m. 3 March 1935); Elizabeth Rarden (m. 1976)
- Issue: Lady Ann Soukup (b. 13 December 1940); Lady Cynthia Hammer (b. 31 August 1946)
- Father: The Rev. Lord Theobald Butler
- Mother: Annabella Brydon Gordon

James Hubert Theobald Charles Butler, 7th Marquess of Ormonde, MBE (19 April 1899 – 25 October 1997) was the son of Reverend Lord Theobald Butler and Lady Annabella Brydon Gordon. He was the 7th and last holder of the title Marquess of Ormonde and the 25th holder of the title Earl of Ormond. The title Earl of Ormond is one of the oldest titles in the peerages in the British Isles, having first been granted to James Butler, 1st Earl of Ormond, who married a granddaughter of Edward I of England.

== Early life ==
Butler's early years were spent at, Ulcombe Rectory in Kent; the Parish was in the gift of his uncle James Butler, 3rd Marquess of Ormonde, who had appointed Charles' father Lord Theobald as Rector in 1899.

The family enjoyed a comfortable existence; in addition to the £550 annual income which the Living at Ulcombe provided to its Rector, Lord Theobald also received £125 a year from his parents' marriage settlement.

Following the death of Charles' grandmother Frances Jane, Dowager Marchioness of Ormonde, in 1903, Lord Theobald received the income from a £5,000 Trust Fund which his mother had bequeathed to him in her will. The income from this Trust would become payable to his widow after his death, and thereafter to their five children in equal shares. In 1919 Lord Theobald was also made the beneficiary of a £275 annual charge on the Ormonde Estates in the will of his eldest brother, James Butler, 3rd Marquess of Ormonde.

These various sources of income allowed the family to employ several servants; the 1901 United Kingdom Census records that Lord Theobald's household employed a staff of seven, including a Cook, Lady's Maid, Parlour maid, Kitchen maid, Scullery Maid, and Housemaid who lived at Ulcombe Rectory, and a coachman who lived at a neighbouring cottage. By the time of the 1911 United Kingdom census Lord Theobald employed a Cook, Kitchen maid, and Parlour maid, as well as a Coachman and Gardener who lived in neighbouring cottages. In 1915 a Welshman, Tom Jones, was also employed as Lord Theobald's Chauffeur for approximately 14 months.

Charles was educated at Haileybury and the Royal Military College, Sandhurst,

== Military service ==
After his graduation from Sandhurst, Butler was commissioned as a Lieutenant in the King’s Royal Rifle Corps in 1917. Although initially too young for front-line duty, he joined the reserve battalion on the Isle of Sheppey before being posted to France in May 1918. Within months he suffered mustard gas exposure and, on recovery, served three years with the Army of Occupation. He was awarded an Order of the British Empire (MBE) in 1921 and subsequently posted to Rawalpindi in British India. Finding peacetime promotion prospects limited, he resigned his commission in 1926 and, after a brief sojourn in China to visit his sister Lilah and her husband, the-then Inspector-General for Chinese Maritime Customs Arthur Edwardes (who was also Charles and Lilah's first cousin), returned to the United Kingdom.

== Emigration to America ==
Butler emigrated to the United States in 1928. He settled in the Chicago area in 1933, where he became business manager of the Art Institute of Chicago throughout the 1940s and 1950s, playing a key role in many of its acquisitions. A resident of Burr Ridge, Illinois he was described as “a tall man with white hair and a mustache, who very much looked the part of a Victorian English gentleman.”

== Marriage and children ==
During the late 1920s, he emigrated to the United States of America, where he met Nan Gilpin, daughter of Garth Griffith Gilpin, whom he married on 3 March 1935. They had two daughters:

- The Lady Ann Soukup (Constance Ann Butler) (b. 13 December 1940)
- The Lady Cynthia Hammer (Violet Cynthia Lilah Butler) (b. 31 August 1946)

He married, secondly, Elizabeth Rarden, daughter of Charles R. Rarden, in 1976. This marriage produced no children.

== Marquess of Ormonde ==
At the time of his birth, Charles' prospects of becoming Marquess of Ormonde were extremely remote; ahead of him in the line of succession were his uncles, the-then incumbent holder of the title The Third Marquess and Lord Arthur Butler, his cousins George Butler and Arthur Butler, as well as his own father Lord Theobald Butler and his older brother Walter Butler. The birth of George's son James Anthony Butler in 1916 further reduced the likelihood of Charles' succession. The deaths of Anthony in 1940, Walter in 1945 and George in 1949, none of whom were survived by a son, rendered Charles as heir presumptive to the family titles by 1950.

In 1971, Charles Butler inherited the Marquessate of Ormonde, the Earldoms of Ormond and Ossory, the Thurles Viscountcy and the Butler of Llanthony Barony upon the death of his cousin, James Arthur Butler, 6th Marquess of Ormonde. He was thenceforth known as The Most Honourable Charles Butler, 7th Marquess of Ormonde.

During the later years of his life, Lord Ormonde maintained an active role as President of the Butler Society. He made regular visits to the city of Kilkenny in Ireland, where the former principal seat of his family, Kilkenny Castle, was located. Ownership of the Castle (which the Butler Family had not inhabited since 1935) had been transferred to the Town and People of Kilkenny by his predecessor, the 6th Marquess, in 1967.

Lord Ormonde died on 25 October 1997 in Chicago, Illinois, aged 98.

Without a male heir, the marquessate became extinct in 1997, while the earldom is dormant. The 18th Viscount Mountgarret, who succeeded his father in 2004 is understood to be the likely heir of the former Marquess' related title Earl of Ormond but has not successfully proven the claim.

== Arms ==
Coat of arms of Charles Butler, 7th Marquess of Ormonde

Coronet
A Coronet of a Marquess
Crest
Out of a Ducal Coronet Or a Plume of five Ostrich Feathers thereon issuant a Falcon rising all Argent
Escutcheon
Quarterly: 1st, Or a Chief indented Azure; 2nd, Gules three covered Cups Or; 3rd, Argent a Lion rampant Gules on a Chief of the second a Swan close of the first between two Annulets Or; 4th, Ermine a Saltire Gules
Supporters
Dexter: a Falcon wings expanded Argent beaked and membered Or; Sinister: a Male Griffin Argent beaked rayed collared and chained Or
Motto
(Above the Crest) Comme Je Trouve; (Below the Arms) Butler A Boo

Peerage of Ireland
Preceded by James Arthur Butler	Marquess of Ormonde; 1971–1997	Extinct
Preceded by James Arthur Butler	Earl of Ormonde, Earl of Ossory; 1971–1997	Dormant
