= Lord Theobald Butler =

The Reverend Lord Theobald Butler (24 August 1852 – 16 June 1929) was a British clergyman who was the youngest son of John Butler, 2nd Marquess of Ormonde and his wife, Frances Jane Paget. At the time of his birth, he was the fourth son of Lord and Lady Ormonde, and he was christened James Theobald Bagot John Butler. As a younger son of a marquess, he received the honorific prefix of Lord from birth.

He is historically significant as being one of the last male members of the ancient House of Ormonde (see Earl of Ormond). He was the brother of James Butler, 3rd Marquess of Ormonde and Arthur Butler, 4th Marquess of Ormonde, the uncle of George Butler, 5th Marquess of Ormonde and Arthur Butler, 6th Marquess of Ormonde, and the father of Charles Butler, 7th Marquess of Ormonde. Through his mother he was a grandson of General The Hon. Sir Edward Paget and a great-grandson of Henry Paget, 1st Earl of Uxbridge and George Legge, 3rd Earl of Dartmouth.

== Biography ==
=== Career ===
Lord Theobald attended Cambridge University, and was ordained first as a Deacon in 1875 and later as a Priest in the Church of England in 1880. After holding a number of curacies during his early career, he was appointed as the Rector of Croxton Kerrial, Leicestershire in 1888, and served in this position for a decade. In 1898 he was appointed as the Rector of Ulcombe, Kent; the Living at Ulcombe was in the gift of his older brother, Lord Ormonde.

Lord Theobald resigned from the Rectorship of Ulcombe in 1923 due to poor health; the Rectory was vacated and he retired to Bournemouth; during his retirement he served as the honorary Assistant Priest at St Michael's Church, Bournemouth.

=== Family ===
He married Annabella Gordon, daughter of clergyman Dr Cosmo Reid Gordon, and had five children:

- James Walter Theobold Gordon Butler (born 19 May 1886, died 2 May 1945 without issue), who married Alice Theodora Aked in 1926
- Violet Mary Emily Maud Butler (born 22 April 1889, died 30 September 1973 with issue), who married Ronald Victor Okes Hart-Synnot in 1912.
  - The Rev. Anthony Ronald Patrick Arthur Hart-Synnot
- Sybil Frances Christina Lilah Butler (born 10 February 1891, died 30 September 1970 without issue), who married her first cousin, Arthur Henry Francis Edwardes in 1913.
- Victoria Blanche Constance Theodora Butler (born 28 September 1897, died 15 June 1952 with issue), who married Charles Bellville West (maternal grandson of Perfumer James Atkinson of Atkinsons of London) in 1920.
  - Bridget Annie West, who married (1) Peter M. Jennings (2) Henry Ford (3) John R. Gorton
- James Hubert Theobald Charles Butler, 7th Marquess of Ormonde (born 19 April 1899, died 25 October 1997 with issue), who married (1) Nan Gilpin in 1935 and (2) Elizabeth Rarden in 1976.
  - The Lady Constance Anne Butler
  - Lady Violet Cynthia Lilah Butler

He performed the marriage ceremony of his brother Lord Arthur Butler (later Arthur Butler, 4th Marquess of Ormonde) and the Chicago Heiress Ellen Stager in 1887.

==== Income and Inheritance ====
Under the terms of his parents' 1843 marriage settlement, any children of their union other than the first son would be entitled to share a £10,000 charge on the Ormonde Settled Estates, payable at 5% per annum, after the death of Theobald's father John Butler, 2nd Marquess of Ormonde. Following the deaths of Lord Ormonde in 1854 and Lord Hubert Butler in 1867, the £500 annual income from this charge on the Ormonde Estates was shared between Lord Theobald and his siblings Lord Arthur Butler, Lady Mary Butler and Lady Blanche Butler, who each received £125 p.a.

Following the death of his father, Lord Theobald's older brother James Edward, Earl of Ossory succeeded to the family titles and estates, which he took full possession of upon reaching his majority in 1865. Their widowed mother Frances Jane, Dowager Marchioness of Ormonde enjoyed a £2,000 annual income from the Ormonde Estates, and had her own London residence at No. 21 Park Lane, Mayfair from the 1860s to 1890s. The Dowager Marchioness was cared for by Lord Theobald and his family during her final illness, and she died at Ulcombe Rectory in 1903. Her estate was valued at £25,000 for probate in late 1903, and under the terms of her Will she placed £5,000 in a trust fund which Lord Theobald would be paid the income from for life, then to widow if she survived him, and ultimately to their five children in equal shares.

Lord Theobald's oldest brother, The Third Marquess of Ormonde died in 1919; under the terms of his Will, Lord Ormonde had charged the Ormonde Estates with a £275 life annuity payable to Lord Theobald, which would also be payable to his widow is she survived him. Upon Lord Theobald's retirement from the post of Rectory of Ulcombe in 1923 the value of the Living was reportedly to be worth £550 per year (equivalent to £27520 in 2023).

==== Household ====
Records from the 1891 United Kingdom census indicate that Lord Theobald, his wife, and their three children lived at the Vicarage in Croxton Kerrial, and employed two nurses, a cook, housemaid, general servant and footman in their household.

By the time of the 1901 United Kingdom Census, Lord Theobald's household employed a staff of seven, including a Cook, Lady's Maid, Parlour maid, Kitchen maid, Scullery Maid, and Housemaid who lived at Ulcombe Rectory, and a coachman who lived at a neighbouring cottage.

Returns from the 1911 United Kingdom census show that composition of the household had decreased; the residents of Rectory in Ulcombe, Kent then included Lord Theobald, his family, and small household of servants, which included a Cook, Kitchen maid, and Parlour maid, as well as a Coachman and Gardener who lived in neighbouring cottages. In 1915 a Welshman, Tom Jones, was employed as Lord Theobald's Chauffeur for approximately 14 months.

Further reductions in the size of the household were recorded in the 1921 United Kingdom census, with only three female servants being recorded as living at Ulcombe Rectory, as well as a Gardener who lived nearby.

=== Later life and death ===
In 1923 Lord and Lady Theobald Butler took up residence at The Birks No. 2 Branksome Wood Road, Bournemouth. During the final years of his life he lived at No. 2 St Anthony's Road, Bournemouth. He died on 15 June 1929; his funeral was a quiet affair held at St Michael's, Bournemouth, attended by his five children, his brother Arthur Butler, 4th Marquess of Ormonde and sister-in-law Ellen, Marchioness of Ormonde.
