= Anthony Butler, Viscount Thurles =

Soldier and journalist

James Anthony Butler, Viscount Thurles (18 August 1916 – 8 May 1940) was a British aristocrat, soldier, and journalist who was a member of the Butler dynasty from Ireland, and one of the last members of the family to live at Kilkenny Castle. Born the eldest child and only son of George Butler, Earl of Ossory and Sybil Butler, Countess of Ossory, he was the only male-line great-grandson of John Butler, 2nd Marquess of Ormonde; as the only male member of the family of his generation, his premature death in 1940 heralded the eventual extinction of the Marquessate of Ormonde. Through his mother he was a first-cousin once-removed of Sir Winston Churchill.

== Early life ==
Anthony Butler was born at the London home of his parents, No. 2 Gloucester Place, Marylebone on Friday 18 August 1916. His father, then known as Captain George Butler, was the eldest son of Lord Arthur Butler and the Chicago heiress Ellen, Lady Arthur Butler. His mother, then known as The Hon. Mrs George Butler, was the youngest child of William Fellowes, 2nd Baron de Ramsey and Lady Rosamond Spencer-Churchill (a daughter of John Spencer-Churchill, 7th Duke of Marlborough).

At the time of his birth he was third in line to inherit the ancestral titles and estates of the Marquessate of Ormonde after his grandfather and father. Anthony's great-uncle James Butler, 3rd Marquess of Ormonde had been married to Lady Elizabeth Grosvenor for 40 years; as their union had produced only two daughters, Anthony's grandfather was Lord Ormonde's heir presumptive at the time of his birth.

Surviving records at the National Library of Ireland show that in the months prior to Anthony's birth, Lord Ormonde had written to his father George to inform him that George's father, Lord Arthur Butler, had asked Lord Ormonde to postpone his own right to inherit the family estates in favour of George, George's as-yet unborn make descendants, and George's brother Lt. Arthur Butler, owing to the drastic increases in rates of death duties which had arisen during the First World War.

Anthony's grandfather was also a wealthy man in his own right owing to his marriage to an American heiress; Anthony's grandmother Ellen Stager had inherited approximately $300,000 from her father's estate in 1885, and her wealth had enabled her husband to purchase a long lease on a fashionable London townhouse at No. 7 Portman Square, as well as the freehold of a country estate Gennings Park in Kent.

== Viscount Thurles ==
Following the death of the Third Marquess of Ormonde in 1919, Anthony's father succeeded his older brother as Fourth Marquess of Ormonde, and Anthony's father George inherited a life interest in the Ormonde Settled Estates, which included Kilkenny Castle, Ballyknockane Lodge, Tipperary. Much of the family's landed estate in Ireland had been sold in 1903, and the estates, valued between £400,000 and £450,000, were subject to approximately £160,000 in death duties and taxes. Anthony's parents assumed the Ormonde courtesy titles of Earl and Countess of Ossory following the Third Marquess' death, and Anthony in turn was permitted to use the courtesy title Viscount Thurles.

The family took up residence in Ireland in 1920, although records from the 1921 Census indicate that Lord Thurles and his infant sister, Lady Moyra Butler resided with their grandparents in Kent at the time of the census. Lord Thurles was educated at Harrow, with holidays spent at his parents' residence Kilkenny Castle. He later enrolled at Loughborough College in 1934. His parents had installed a tennis court at Kilkenny Castle in the early 1920's, and in 1934 he competed in a tennis tournament at the Tramore Tennis Club in Ireland, where local newspapers praised his skill at the sport. In August 1931, he and his father sailed to Cherbourg and embarked on a tour of the European continent.

== Adulthood ==
In 1934 Thurles spent a year studying in the Automotive Department at Loughborough College, where he resided in the Rutherford Halls of Residence. In February 1935 he departed Loughborough and took a job at Dagenham Ford Works; he was known as "Mr Butler" and drove lorries and stoked furnaces for 30s a week in wages. He later reportedly took a post as a motor salesman in Mayfair in July 1935.

=== Journalist ===
Thurles departed England for the Balkans during the Albanian Crisis in April 1939. He reportedly travelled by air to several "Europeans danger spots"; and in late April he arrived in Sofia, Bulgaria, where he authored a full-page article featured in the Daily Mirror reporting on the unfolding political situation in the region. He noted that he had posted two duplicate copies of an article for the Daily Mail from Athens; one was sent direct to the Newspaper's London Office, whilst another was sent to a friend. The following morning, he wrote that he received a visit from an official working for the Censor Department in the Greek Government, who produced the copy of the letter Thurles had posted to the Daily Mail and warned him that "it would be a pity…if I should have to leave Athens sooner than I anticipated…but of course I would appreciate that this sort of things must stop. It was not in the interests of the country [Greece] and times were so difficult." Thurles attributed this warning to the position of the Metaxas Government of Greece, which he declared was in mortal fear of the Axis powers, and would, in Thurles' view, "go to any lengths to curry favour with them."

In an article published in the Mirror on 3 May 1939, Thurles criticised what he perceived as a lack of effort on the part of the British Government to make overtures to the Government of Bulgaria, asserting that Bulgaria's pro-British learnings were being ignored by the British Government despite the growing possibility of a wider European conflict occurring.

=== Personal life ===
Thurles' brief life was interspersed with a number of driving accidents and encounters with the law.

He was fined 10 shillings in 1934 for riding a bicycle without a rear light at college in 1934. In June he received a further court summons and fine of £1 10s for failing to stop at the signal of a police constable, and 10s for riding a motorbike without an efficient silencer. His defence counsel referred to his client as a "wild young Irishman" to the Judge.

In October 1934 he had a close escape when a car he was driving overturned; he escaped the crash with only minor injuries to two fingers; however the vehicle's other passenger, A. J. Franklin, had to be extricated from the car wreckage.

On 1 August 1935 he was seriously injured in another car accident; at 2am a two-seater car he was driving collided with the rear of a stationary motor lorry. Thurles sustained severe head injuries and a concussion; the incident caused a minor scandal due to the fact that his passenger, Miss Elizabeth May Evatt on Fern House, Rayleigh, Essex, was an unmarried young woman, who sustained a fracture to her left leg, further injuries to her right leg, facial injuries and shock as a result of the crash.

Thurles' injuries from the incident resulted in a permanent loss the sight in one eye. He briefly returned to Kilkenny to recuperate from his accident in late August 1935. Lord Thurles' uncle Lord Arthur Butler later formed the opinion that the crash and Thurles' resulting injuries caused a permanent impact on his personality and general health, and likely contributed to his sudden deterioration and death in 1940.

In October Thurles was subsequently fined £5 in the Hendon Police Court on 14 October 1935 for having used a car without permission and driving without an insurance police; it transpired that the car was owned by a Mrs Roberts, who had left the vehicle for repairs at the garage in Park mews where Thurles was employed. He was ordered to pay 3 guineas in costs and his licence was suspended for 12 months. Newspaper articles reporting on the court proceeding noted that Thurles' address was in Bryanston Square, London, where his grandparents leased a large townhouse at No 11.

Following the crash and subsequent court proceedings, Lord Thurles departed for an extended trip to Australia in late 1935. Following his arrival in Melbourne in early 1936, several local newspapers reported that he had attempted to travel incognito under the name "Mr J. A. Butler" during his voyage to Australia on the ocean liner R.M.S. Ormonde, and that he intended to find employment with a motor car firm during his stay abroad.

Prior to Lord Thurles' voyage to Australia, surviving records of the British Foreign Office indicate that his father Lord Ossory had written to the Foreign Office to request a passport for his son to be made out in the name "James Anthony Butler" so as to avoid use of his courtesy title "Viscount Thurles". Lord Ossory's request was rejected by the British Foreign Office, as there were existing Foreign Office precedents asserting that a passport must contain the full style and title of its owner.

Lord Thurles had returned to London by August 1936, where he was seen dancing at the Savoy Hotel. In a letter to the editor published in the Coventry Evening Telegraph on 22 April 1937, Thurles criticised what he described as the "one-way Empire Free Trading System" which resulted from Dominion countries such as Australia placing tariffs on imported goods from the United Kingdom, despite the fact the government of the United Kingdom placed no reciprocal tariffs on goods imported from the Empire's Dominions. The article noted that Thurles' address was 15 Basil Street, London SW3 in Knightsbridge.

Thurles was socially active amongst Britain's upper classes, attending the Nottingham Women's Hospital Ball as part of Lady May Abel Smith's party in November 1934. In June 1938 Thurles' grandparents Lord and Lady Ormonde loaned their large London townhouse at 11 Bryanston Square to his parents for large ball; the event doubled as celebration of Thurles' coming-of-age (he had attained the age of 21 in August of the prior year) as well as a debutante 'coming out' ball for Lord Thurles' sister Lady Moyra Butler. The guest list reported in newspapers at the time included a significant number of prominent individuals from British and American High Society during the late 1930s, including American Ambassador Joseph Kennedy, Kathleen Kennedy, the-then Mistress of the Robes the Duchess of Northumberland, Lord Carisbrooke, Lady Iris Mountbatten, Clarissa Churchill, the Earl Spencer and The Hon. Pamela Digby.

In October 1939 Thurles successfully defended a summons for assault in the Westminster Police Court. He was alleged to have entered a wine store on 30 September with a friend, ordered a bottle of whisky, and proceeded to tender a cheque from someone the shop's proprietor did not know as payment. He proceeded to use "bad language" when the cheque was refused, and he was asked to leave the store; the shopkeeper proceeded to call the police when Thurles and his companion refused to depart. The shopkeeper alleged that Thurles tripped him, which caused him to fall and stumble into Thurles, who, by his own admission, proceeded to punch the shopkeeper in the neck.

==== Inheritance ====
Under the terms of the Will of his uncle James Butler, 3rd Marquess of Ormonde, Thurles stood to inherit a life interest in the Ormonde Settled Estates Trust upon the death of his father. During his youth, the finances of the Ormonde Estates continued to steadily decline; whilst Estate income had exceeded £20,000 in the 1890s, this had fallen to approximately £9,000 in 1930. A number of family charges also drained the falling income of the estate; between 1919 and 1927, this averaged between £2,500 and £4,500. The cost of maintaining Kilkenny Castle placed a further strain on finances; in 1904 this amount was some £4,400, but this had fallen to £2,166 in the 1920s, and approximately £1,200 in the early 1930s. In 1935 Thurles' parents announced that they would vacate Kilkenny Castle, and instead split their time between London and the family's former shooting lodge in Ireland, Ballyknockane Lodge, Tipperary. Many of the contents of the castle were sold in 1935 and the building underwent a period of neglect.

In contrast to the diminishing Ormonde inheritance which Thurles stood to inherit from his father, his American grandmother Ellen, Marchioness of Ormonde had grown even wealthier in the early 1920's following the deaths of her two older sisters, both of whom died childless and widowed. Thurles' great-aunt Annie Stager Hickox left an estate of $847,000 in 1922 ($16,287,000 in 2025 when adjusted for inflation) from which Ellen received approximately $650,000 (£130,000) after the payment of taxes, administration costs and specific bequests. By the 1930's Ellen's fortune (held in Trust in Ohio by the Cleveland Trust Company) produced an income in excess of £12,000 ($60,000) annually.

The anticipation of his eventual inheritance may have rendered Thurles as a poor manager of his own finances; in the late 1930's his father had to arrange for £1,500 to be withdrawn from the Ormonde Settled Estates Trust to pay off debts Thurles had incurred. Thurles was required to surrender a $1,200 savings account he held in Cleveland, Ohio as part of the arrangement.

== Second World War and Death ==
At the outbreak of war he was commissioned with the Hussars, but subsequently invalidated out. He eventually obtained a role as a Driver in the A.T.S with the rank of Private, and later took convalescence leave. His poor health was attributed to the ongoing effects of injuries he sustained in the car accident of August 1935.

He was reportedly present at the wedding of his first cousin the 9th Earl of Aylesford on 18 April 1940, but was reported to also have arrived at Ryde on the Isle of Wight in mid-to-late April 1940 for a period of convalescence.

He briefly returned to London to perform the role of Usher at the wedding of his sister Lady Moyra Butler to Capt Charles Weld-Forester in London on 1 May 1940. His health began to deteriorate sharply on 3 May, and he was removed to the Vectis Nursing Home in Ryde on 6 May. His sister and brother-in-law were reportedly at his bedside when he died on 9 May, but his parents, who had returned to Ireland after his sister's wedding, were unable to reach Ryde before his passing. His remains were cremated in Southampton on Friday 10 May 1940, and interred at the family grave at Kilkenny Castle.

His estate was probated on 24 March 1942; the gross value of his estate in England was £145, but the net value amounted to £0. As a result of Thurles' death, his uncle Lt. Col. Lord Arthur Butler succeeded as Sixth Marquess of Ormonde when Thurles' father George Butler, 5th Marquess of Ormonde died in 1949. Thurles sister Lady Moyra also died at the comparatively young age of 38 in 1959, as did her two sons; Piers Weld-Forester at the age of 31 in 1977, and Comte Gerard van den Steen de Jehay at the age of 36 in 1985.
