= Anson Stager =

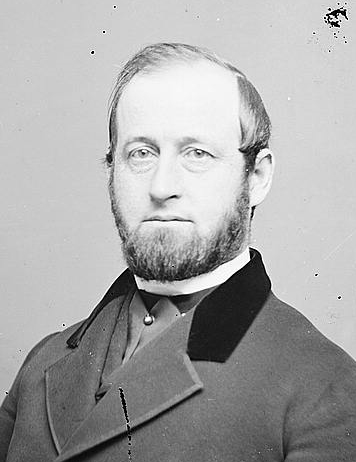
- Anson Stager
- Born: April 22, 1825; Ontario County, New York
- Died: March 26, 1885 (aged 59); Chicago, Illinois
- Military career
- Allegiance: United States; Union
- Branch: Union Army
- Service years: 1861–1866
- Rank: Colonel; Brevet Brigadier General
- Commands: Military Telegraph Department
- Conflicts: American Civil War
- Other work: President of Western Electric Manufacturing Company

Anson Stager (April 20, 1825 – March 26, 1885) was the co-founder of Western Union, the first president of Western Electric Manufacturing Company and a Union Army officer, where he was head of the Military Telegraph Department during the American Civil War.

== Early life ==
Anson Stager was born in Ontario County, New York to Henry Wade Stager and Elmira Stager (nee Anson).

== Career ==
At age sixteen, Stager began working as an apprentice on the Rochester Daily Advertiser for a printer and telegraph builder named Henry O'Reilly of Rochester, New York. After the latter had a telegraph line constructed from Philadelphia to Harrisburg, he placed Stager in operator positions in Philadelphia and Pittsburgh. At age 21, Stager was put in charge of the first Lancaster, Pennsylvania, office in 1846. In the spring of 1848, he was made chief operator of the "National lines" at Cincinnati, Ohio, where he made several improvements in battery and wire arrangement. In 1852, he was promoted to superintendent and also served as the first general superintendent of Western Union Company, newly consolidated in 1856.

As general superintendent, Stager played an important role in the consolidation and expansion of Western Union's early network; he assisted in reorganizing its lines, restoring infrastructure and negotiating agreements with railroad companies, through which Western Union obtained protected routes for its long-distance lines along railroad rights-of-way while, in many locations, railroad station agents could undertake telegraphic work without the company having to maintain separate offices. Stager developed extensive relationships with railroad officials and personally participated in many of these negotiations, explaining the value of telegraphy for the operation and dispatching of trains; the resulting agreements helped bind the interests of the rapidly expanding railroad and telegraph systems together.

Stager was also credited with a number of practical improvements in telegraph operation, including arrangements by which several wires could draw power from the same battery and the connection of long-distance lines so that messages did not have to be repeatedly retransmitted at intermediate stations. He was an early practitioner of receiving Morse telegraph messages by sound rather than reading the marks produced on paper register tape; Stager later recalled that, when a recording apparatus failed while he was working as an operator in Pittsburgh, he successfully received a market report by listening to the instrument, although he himself stopped short of claiming that he had been the first person to discover the technique.

=== Civil War service ===
Following the outbreak of the American Civil War in April 1861, Ohio governor William Dennison, Jr. requested that Stager travel from Cleveland to Columbus and take charge of telegraphic communications in southern Ohio and along the Virginia line, while also assisting George B. McClellan, who had been appointed to command the military department which included Ohio. Dennison also asked Stager to devise a telegraphic cipher through which the governors of Ohio, Indiana and Illinois could communicate securely; Stager subsequently prepared another cipher which was used by Allan Pinkerton and by Union commanders including McClellan, Robert Anderson and John C. Frémont during operations in western Virginia, Kentucky and the western theater.

On May 27, 1861 McClellan appointed Stager superintendent, for military purposes, of all telegraph lines within the Department of the Ohio military district. Stager proceeded to organize telegraph operators and construction parties which could follow advancing Union forces and extend telegraphic communications into the field; during McClellan's campaign in western Virginia, these working parties often constructed lines behind the advancing army so that military headquarters could remain in rapid communication with forces at the front.

The success of Stager's work attracted the attention of the federal government, and on October 16, 1861, Assistant Secretary of War Thomas A. Scott summoned Stager to Washington, D.C. where he was asked to devise a plan for the organization of a centralized telegraph department for government service. His proposals were adopted, and Stager was appointed brigade quartermaster, with the rank of captain, and detailed as general superintendent of government telegraphs in all military departments. On February 26, 1862, Stager was commissioned colonel and attached as an aide-de-camp to Secretary of War Edwin Stanton.

Stager's responsibilities required the military telegraph system to maintain communications between Washington and Union armies operating over an enormous geographical area, often in territory where existing lines had been damaged, destroyed or were inaccessible. During the first years of the war he was based almost continuously in Washington; the strain of the work contributed to a decline in his health, however, and in April 1863 he was permitted to establish his permanent headquarters again in Cleveland, while retaining overall supervision of the system and travelling when circumstances required his presence elsewhere.

The cryptographic system used for much of the government's telegraphic correspondence was devised by Stager and was intended to prevent intercepted Union messages from being deciphered by Confederate telegraphers. A contemporary assessment quoted in an 1886 biography of Stager estimated that the military telegraph system operated approximately 15,000 miles of line and transmitted about 6.5 million messages during the war, at a total cost to the federal government of approximately $2.66 million.

He remained in service until 1866, continuing to lead the department as civilian until September 1868. Stager was subsequently appointed as a brevet brigadier general of volunteers for his war service.

=== Later career ===
After the Civil War, Stager returned his attention to Western Union. When further consolidation of the American telegraph industry required another reorganization of the company, he was offered the general superintendency of the enlarged system but declined; Western Union's operations were instead divided into Central, Eastern and Southern divisions, with Stager assuming control of the Central Division, an arrangement which initially allowed him to retain his headquarters and home in Cleveland. The rapid expansion of business in the Mississippi Valley and western states eventually made a headquarters farther west desirable, however, and in 1869 Stager moved to Chicago, Illinois; he remained associated with Western Union until October 1881.

In Chicago, Stager served as president of Western Electric. He had been instrumental in founding the Western Electric Manufacturing Company, whose works were initially located in Cleveland before being transferred to Chicago, and remained its president until January 1, 1885. He was also president of the Chicago Telephone Company and president of the Western Edison Company, and secured a consolidation of the former telephone interests. Stager was an early supporter of telephone service in Chicago and was described as having served as president of the city's early telephone companies from their establishment, subsequently helping to bring their competing interests together through consolidation. He was also prominently involved in the introduction of electric lighting to Chicago, serving as president of the Western Edison Light Company from its foundation until his death; during his tenure he was a co-Director of the company with Thomas Edison.

Following his move to Chicago, he also became the leading representative of the Vanderbilt family's business interests in the Midwest. His business interests extended well beyond telegraphy and electrical manufacturing; he held directorships in the Michigan Central Railroad, New York, Chicago and St. Louis Railroad and Chicago and North Western Railway, and was also a director of the Northwestern National Bank of Chicago, the Cantilever Bridge Company and the Allen Paper Car Wheel Company, as well as being involved in the Babcock Manufacturing Company and serving as a trustee of the Mutual Life Insurance Company of New York. Earlier, while living in Cleveland, he had also been associated with the Cleveland Rolling Mill Company and served as a director of the Citizens' Savings and Loan Association.

He also assisted the Chicago authorities in the development of the city's fire-alarm telegraph system, an application of electrical communications which remained closely related to the technological interests that had occupied most of his professional life.

Stager was active in Chicago's civic and social institutions as well as its business community; he was a founder of the Commercial Club of Chicago and one of its prominent early supporters, and was also among the founders of the Calumet Club, of which he became the first president. He had long been associated with the Episcopal Church and served for a number of years as a vestryman of Trinity Church in Chicago; he was also a Freemason and retained his membership in the Oriental Commandery of the Knights Templar in Cleveland until his death.

== Personal life ==
=== Marriage and descendants ===
In 1847 Stager married Rebecca Sprague of Buffalo, New York; the marriage produced five children, three of whom survived into adulthood:

- Emma Louise Stager (1849–1923), who married Frank Sanford Gorton in 1880.
- Annie Stager (1851–1922), who married Ralph Warner Hickox in 1879.
- Mary Adelaide Stager (1853–1854)
- Charles Wade Stager (1860–1867)
- Ellen Sprague Stager (1865–1951), who married British aristocrat Lord Arthur Butler (later 4th Marquess of Ormonde) in 1887.
  - Lady Evelyn Frances Butler (1887–1978), who married the Hon. Edmund Rupert Drummond in 1910.
    - Anne Drummond (1911–1985)
    - Jean Constance Drummond (1914–1997)
    - James Ralph Drummond (1918–1944)
  - James George Anson Butler, 5th Marquess of Ormonde (1890–1949), who married the Hon Sybil Fellowes in 1915.
    - James Anthony Butler, Viscount Thurles (1916–1940)
    - Lady Moyra Rosamund Butler (1920–1959), who married (1) Lt. Charles Weld-Forester in 1940 and (2) Comte Guy van den Steen de Jehay in 1948.
  - James Arthur Norman Butler, 6th Marquess of Ormonde (1893–1971), who married Jesse Carlos Clarke in 1924.
    - Lady Jane Butler (1925–1992), who married Peter Heaton in 1945 (divorce 1952).
    - Lady Martha Butler (1926–2010), who married Sir Ashley Ponsonby, 2nd Bt in 1950.
  - Lady Eleanor Rachel Butler (1894–1969), who married (1) Edward Brassey Egerton in 1915 and (2) William Henry Prior in 1961.

General Stager became a widower after his wife Rebecca Sprague Stager died in October 1883.

=== Residences ===
Stager commissioned the construction of a large mansion in Cleveland, Ohio at No. 3813 Euclid Avenue (then known as Millionaire's Row), which was completed in 1866. Purchase of the land and construction of the property cost Stager approximately $60,000, and the house continues to be known as the Stager-Beckwith House.

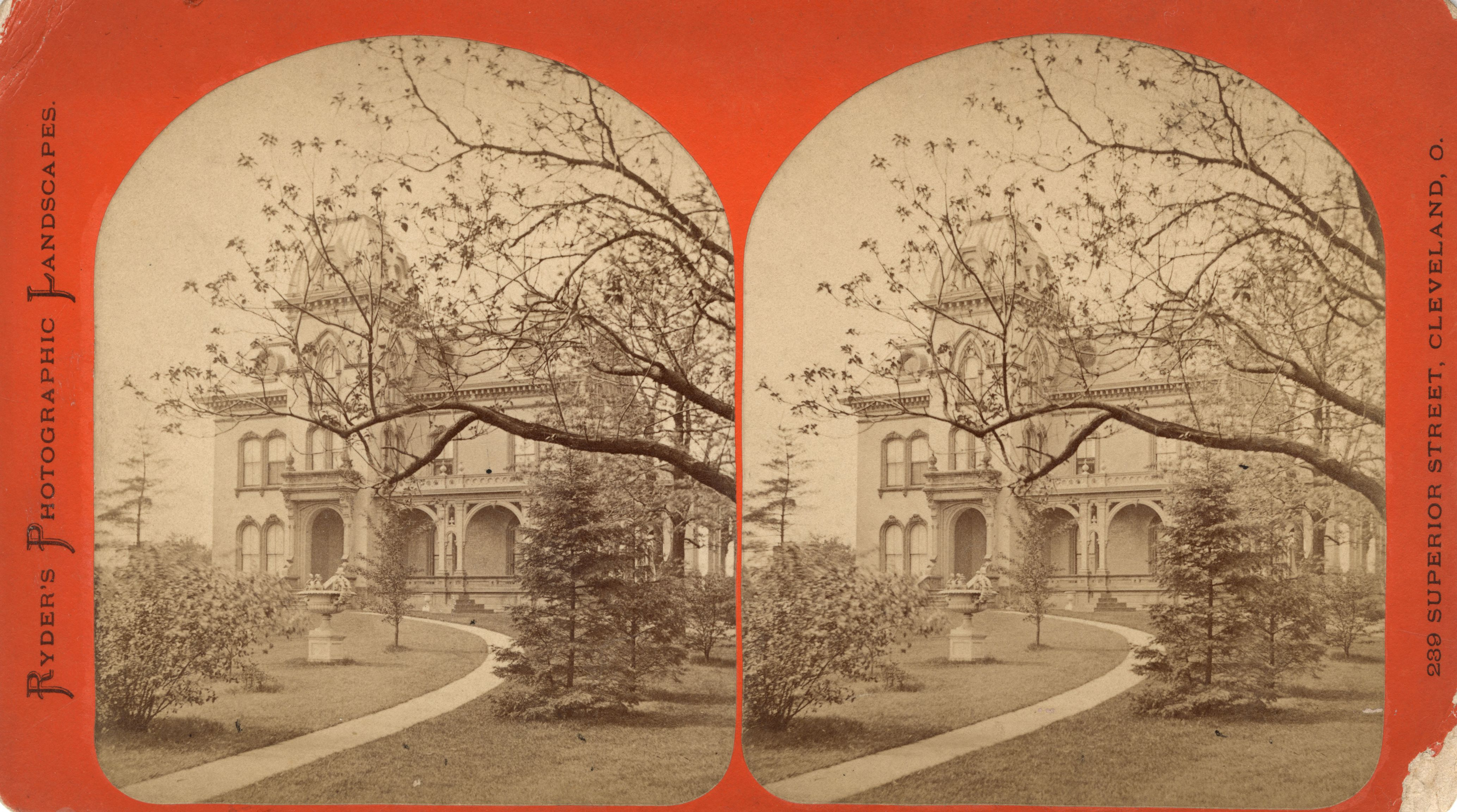
The Stager-Beckwith House in Cleveland, Ohio, General Stager's home from 1866 to 1869

The Euclid Avenue mansion was sold to businessman Thomas Sterling Beckwith in 1869, after which Stager moved his family to Chicago, where they initially lived at No. 672 Michigan Avenue. In 1878 Stager was the founding President of the city's exclusive Calumet Gentlemen's club; the club initially leased a large house at No. 1733 Michigan Avenue as their clubhouse, situated on the corner of Michigan Avenue and Eighteenth Street. Stager subsequently purchased the house on behalf of a consortium of club members for $38,000 in December 1880.

In May 1883 the Calumet Club relocated to a larger, purpose-built clubhouse on the corner of Michigan Avenue and Twentieth Street, after which Stager purchased the former clubhouse building at 1733 Michigan Avenue. He subsequently demolished the building and commissioned Solon Spencer Beman to design a large private home, which was completed in late 1883.

Following General Stager's death in 1885, No. 1733 Michigan Avenue was sold by his executors to wealthy building contractor William Boyden Howard for $70,000; the sale was finalised in May 1887. The house was later leased by several members of the Vanderbilt family, headed by William Kissam Vanderbilt, for a six-month period during the Chicago World's Fair in 1893.

== Death and legacy ==
Anson Stager died at his home in Chicago on March 26, 1885. His funeral was held at his home 28 March 1885; his pallbearers included Marshall Field, Joseph Russell Jones, Nathaniel Kellogg Fairbank, Martin Ryerson Sr., and Robert Todd Lincoln (former US Secretary of War and son of President Abraham Lincoln).

In April 1885 his estate was initially valued at $850,000 for probate in 1885 (equivalent to $25,400,000 in 2024); this amount included an estimated $125,000 of real estate and $725,000 of personal assets, including $262,000 worth of shares in the Michigan Telephone Company, $60,000 of Union Steel Shares, and $60,000 of Cleveland Rolling Mill Co. Shares. His fortune was divided equally between his three daughters. Under the terms of Anson Stager's will his two eldest daughters Louise Stager Gorton and Annie Stager Hickox, aged 35 and 33 when their father died, were to receive half of their respective shares immediately, with the remaining half held in trust until they each reached the age of 40. Stager's younger daughter Ellen Sprague Stager, aged 19 when her father died, was to have her share held in a trust from which she would be paid the income, with one quarter vesting into her absolute ownership when she either married or turned 21, with a further quarter to be paid when she turned 30, and the remaining half vesting into her full ownership at the age of 40.

The fortune which Stager amassed during his lifetime and subsequently bequeathed to his three surviving children enabled his daughter Ellen Stager to join the ranks of the American "Dollar Princesses" who married members of the British Aristocracy; in 1887 she was married to Lord Arthur Butler, younger brother and heir-presumptive of James Butler, 3rd Marquess of Ormonde. Lord Arthur succeeded as Marquess of Ormonde in 1919, and Ellen became the Marchioness of Ormonde. As Stager's two elder daughters Louise Gorton and Annie Hickox both died childless during the early 1920s, the bulk of the family's wealth eventually passed to Ellen and her descendants.

== See also ==
- List of American Civil War brevet generals
- Stager, Michigan
