= Arthur Butler, 6th Marquess of Ormonde =

British peer and army officer

The Most Honourable James Arthur Norman Butler CVO MC
- Sixth Marquess of Ormonde

Marquess of Ormonde
- Tenure: 21 June 1949 – 17 April 1971
- Predecessor: George Butler, 5th Marquess of Ormonde
- Successor: Charles Butler, 7th Marquess of Ormonde
- Born: 25 April 1893
- Died: 17 April 1971 (aged 77)
- Offices: Member of the Honourable Corps of Gentlemen at Arms (1936–1963); High Steward of Wokingham (1956–1971)
- Noble family: Butler dynasty
- Spouse: Jessie Carlos Clarke
- Issue: Lady Jane Heaton (1925–1992); Lady Martha Ponsonby (1926–2010)
- Father: James Arthur Wellington Foley Butler, 4th Marquess of Ormonde
- Mother: Ellen Stager

James Arthur Norman Butler, 6th Marquess of Ormonde, CVO, MC (25 April 1893 – 1971), was a British peer, Army Officer and Veteran of the First and Second World Wars. He was the son of James Arthur Wellington Foley Butler, 4th Marquess of Ormonde and Ellen Butler, Marchioness of Ormonde (née Stager).

== Early life ==
James Arthur Norman Butler was born on 25 April 1893 at the home of his paternal grandmother Frances, Dowager Marchioness of Ormonde at 21 Park Lane, London. His parents were Lord Arthur Butler and Ellen, Lady Arthur Butler.

At the time of Arthur's birth, his father was the eldest surviving brother of James Butler, 3rd Marquess of Ormonde. The 3rd Marquess had no sons, and at the time of Arthur's parents' marriage it was considered likely that his father would inherit the family titles upon the death of the 3rd Marquess.

Arthur's father, also known as Arthur ('Lord Arthur Senior'), had been born the third son of John Butler, 2nd Marquess of Ormonde. The Butler Family were an ancient Anglo-Irish Aristocratic Family, and the family seat at Kilkenny Castle had been in their possession since 1391.

Lord Arthur Senior had a military background, having served as a British Army Officer in the 1st Life Guards. He later served as State Steward to Henry Herbert, 4th Earl of Carnarvon during the latter's tenure as Lord-Lieutenant of Ireland in 1885–86. The deaths of his father Lord Ormonde in 1854 and his older brother Lord Hubert Butler in 1867 had rendered him as the heir presumptive to the family titles, which were held by his elder brother the Third Marquess of Ormonde. Upon his older brother's marriage to Lady Elizabeth Grosvenor in 1876, it seemed likely that the Third Marquess would have a son who would supplant Lord Arthur Senior as heir to the family titles and estates. However, by the mid 1880s it had become apparent that the Third Marquess would not have a son, following the births of his daughters Lady Beatrice Butler and Lady Constance Butler in 1876 and 1879.

Despite his position as heir to the family titles, Lord Arthur Senior was not a wealthy man. He acted as Agent to his brother's estates, and surviving records indicate that his allowance from his brother was £500 per year. He divided his time between his mother's London Home at 21 Park Lane, Kilkenny Castle, and the family's shooting lodge Ballyknockane Lodge, Tipperary in Ireland, which had been built by his brother. The Ormondes also owned several hundred acres of land in Kent, England, which included the living at the Parish of Ulcombe, worth some £500 in the late 1800s. In 1898 the living at Ulcombe Rectory was given to Arthur's younger brother, Lord Theobald Butler.

His brother's lack of male heir after ten years of marriage may have spurned Lord Arthur Senior to marry and start a family of his own, given the increasingly likelihood that he and any sons he may father would be next in time to inherit the Ormonde titles and estates. Lord Arthur Senior became engaged to the American heiress Ellen Stager in 1886, and the pair were married in London in 1887.

Ellen was the daughter of U.S. Union General Anson Stager, who had played a key role in the development of the Union Wartime Telegraph Service during the U.S. Civil War. He made a large fortune in the post-war years, and was a business associate of the Vanderbilt family and Thomas Edison, and a friend of Robert Todd Lincoln. He became a well-known and respected figure in Chicago Society in the later decades of his life. Upon his death in 1885, Ellen inherited a third share of his $850,000 Estate. Whilst this amount was comparatively small when compared to the fortunes bought to Great Britain and Ireland by other American Heiresses in the late-nineteenth century, her income of $12,000 – $25,000 (£2,400 – £5,000) in the 1880s and 1890s it allowed her husband to maintain separate and independent households from his family. The deaths of her two older, childless sisters in the early 1920s, as well as growth in investment values resulted in Ellen's income from American Investments being £16,000 ($80,000) a year in 1930, indicating that her fortune grew to some $1,600,000 (£320,000) by the end of the 1920s.

During Arthur's childhood, his parents maintained a series of residences in both London and the English Home Counties. From 1895 to 1898 they leased Sandleford Priory, near Newbury, and were recorded as living at Willesley House near Crankbrook, Kent in the 1901 Census. This Census also recorded that their household employed a large staff of domestic servants, including a Governess, Butler, Cook, two Footmen, three Housemaids, a Kitchen Maid, and a Nurse.

In mid-1901 Arthur's parents purchased Gennings Park, a large Manor House and Estate in Hunton, Kent. This would remain as their country home until Lord Arthur Senior's death in 1943 and Ellen's death in 1951.

Lord Arthur Senior and Ellen also maintained a large townhouse in London at 7 Portman Square from early 1900 until 1925.

Arthur Junior was educated at Harrow, and the Royal Military College, Sandhurst. His coming-of-age coincided with outbreak of the First World War, and he served with the British Army throughout the War. He was awarded the Military Cross in 1918.

== 1919 to 1949 ==
Arthur's uncle Lord Ormonde died in 1919, and Arthur's father Lord Arthur Butler succeeded to the family titles as 4th Marquess of Ormonde, 22nd Earl of Ormond and 16th Earl of Ossory. As the younger son of a Marquess, Arthur became entitled to use the honorary prefix of 'Lord', and was thenceforth known as 'Lord Arthur Butler', as his own father had been prior to his accession as Lord Ormonde. The Ormonde Estates were inherited by Arthur's brother George, following their father's request that his inheritance be relinquished so as to not burden the family estates with inheritance taxes twice-over within a single generation. The estates had been valued at some £450,000 on the death of the Third Marquess, and this was substantially reduced due to the levying on some £160,000 in inheritance taxes on his death. By the time of his inheritance, Arthur's brother George (now known by the courtesy title Earl of Ossory) had had two children, Anthony and Moyra (now known by the courtesy titles Viscount Thurles and Lady Moyra), and Arthur's eventual succession to the family titles and estates would have seemed unlikely.

The new Lord Arthur Butler married Jessie Carlos Clarke, daughter of the renowned London Stockbroker Charles Carlos Clarke, on 26 January 1924. They had two daughters:

- Lady Jane Butler (b. 9 January 1925, d. 22 October 1992) married Peter Heaton
  - Mark Heaton (b. 1948)
- Lady Martha Butler (b. 14 January 1926, d. 12 August 2010) married Sir Ashley Charles Ponsonby, 2nd Bt
  - Sir Charles Ashley Ponsonby, 3rd Bt (b. 1951)
  - Rupert Spencer Ponsonby (b. 1953)
  - Luke Arthur Ponsonby (b. 1957)
  - John Piers Ponsonby (b. 1962)

Upon her marriage, Jesse became entitled to use the courtesy style of Lady Arthur Butler. In the month before their marriage, Arthur's mother, Ellen, Marchioness of Ormonde settled £16,000 in Trust upon Arthur, which was increased by £5,000 in October 1924. Based on surviving records regarding the settled capital sum and annual income from George, Earl of Ossory's Marriage Settlement, this Trust would have provided the new Lord and Lady Arthur Butler with an annual income of £750-£1,000 during the early years of their marriage.

In September 1930 Arthur and Jesse sailed to Egypt, where Arthur's regiment (The 17th/21st Lancers) were stationed, whilst their daughters remained in England in the care of Jesse's mother. By this time Arthur had reached the ranked of Major, and contemporary newspapers reported Major Lord Arthur Butler M.C. Lord Arthur Butler M.C. as being second-in-command of the regiment. Arthur later served as the Regiment's Commanding Officer from March 1931 until March 1935. In the same year he moved his family to Nobbscrook Farm in Windsor Forest, Berkshire.

Arthur was appointed a Gentleman-at-Arms in 1936, and served in World War II (1940–1945). The 1939 England and Wales Registers records Arthur as living at Nobscrook Farm with his wife Jesse and their two daughters, with a staff of three including a Cook, Housemaid and Domestic Children's Nurse.

The unexpected death of his nephew James Anthony Butler, Viscount Thurles, in 1940 made Arthur the heir presumptive to his brother George, Lord Ormonde.

Following the death of his father Arthur Butler, 4th Marquess of Ormonde, Lord Arthur moved his family to Gennings Park, Kent to live with his widowed mother Ellen, Dowager Marchioness of Ormonde.

== Marquess of Ormonde ==
In 1949 Arthur's elder brother George died, and Arthur succeeded him as Marquess of Ormonde, Earl of Ormond, Earl of Ossory, Viscount Thurles, Baron Butler and 30th Chief Butler of Ireland. Upon his accession as Lord Ormonde, he inherited a significantly reduced estate compared to the wealth and income which his Uncle and Brother had enjoyed. In 1893, the year of Arthur's birth, the Ormonde Estates had generated some £22,000 annually, but as a result of heavy taxation and the sale of much of the family's landed estate in Ireland and death duties, by 1950 the estate's annual income had been reduced to approximately £7,000. Furthermore, the family's ancestral home, Kilkenny Castle, had been vacated in the early 1930s by George, owing to the rising costs of maintaining the castle.

In 1951 Arthur applied for a Court Sanction of the sale of the Ancient 'Ormonde Manuscripts' for £20,000, which was approved in the Dublin High Court in on 21 June 1951. The actual sale had already been concluded by Arthur's brother George prior to his death, but this was later found to have lacked the necessary judicial approvals.

Upon his accession to the Marquessate, Arthur and his family continued to live with his mother Ellen at Gennings Park in Kent. He was the first Marquess of Ormonde to have not lived at Kilkenny Castle at some stage of his life, and one of the few Earls of Ormond who did not occupy the Castle during the Butler Family's 576-year period of ownership. Ellen died in 1951, and Arthur inherited the Gennings Estate. Now a prominent local landowner, he held the office of Deputy Lieutenant of Kent between 1952 and 1955. Both Lord and Lady Ormonde attended the Coronation of Elizabeth II at Westminster Abbey in 1953; Lady Ormonde wore Norman Hartnell gown.

Arthur and Jesse's daughters departed the family household following their respective marriages in 1945 and 1950. Gennings was sold in 1955, and in the same year Arthur and his wife Jesse (now Marquess and Marchioness of Ormonde) returned to Berkshire, where they purchased Cantley House in Wokingham.

Arthur served as High Steward of Wokingham from 1956, and was created Commander, Royal Victorian Order in 1960. He reached the rank of Lieutenant-Colonel and commander of his regiment, the 17/21st Lancers.

=== Sale of Kilkenny Castle ===
In 1967, Arthur sold Kilkenny Castle to the Kilkenny Castle Restoration Committee for the nominal sum of £50. The castle had been deteriorating for many years, and much of the contents and artwork had been sold by his brother George and his niece Moyra; consequently many of the rooms had lain bare and empty for years. He was quoted by contemporary newspapers as attributing the decision to part with the Castle (which had been in possession of his family for over half a millennium since 1391) to the fact that the Castle's deterioration was inevitable due to its lack of occupants, and by 1967 the cost of restoring the Castle as a private residence was too expensive; estimates for roof repairs alone amounted to £500,000. Arthur's daughter Lady Martha Ponsonby also quoted as praising her father for his efforts to keep the roof of such a large structure maintained, and noting that the Castle was empty when her father came into his inheritance in 1949, and that the decision to undertake the sale was made in agreement with Arthur's cousin and eventual successor Charles Butler. Arthur worked to transfer ownership of approximately twenty acres of surrounding parkland from the Ormonde Settled Estates Trust to public ownership, which was incurred at considerable personal expense; as the life-tenant of the Trust, he was required to reimburse the Trust for the cost of the land.

== Later life and descendants ==
Arthur became a widower in 1969 upon the death of his wife of forty-five years, Jesse, Marchioness of Ormonde. He died in 1971, and was succeeded by his first-cousin Charles as Marquess of Ormonde. Arthur's unsettled estate was valued at £172,065 gross and £145,112 net, with death duties of £65,963 payable. A large collection of Regency Silver and gilded silver, valued at £266,000, was given to the United Kingdom Government in 1980 in lieu of inheritance taxes on the Settled Ormonde Estates following Arthur's death.

Following his death, his executors sought a buyer for his Berkshire Home, Cantley House; the asking price for the property was reported as being £100,000 in 1975. In early 1976 Cantley House and its 66-acre demense was sold to the Wokingham District Council for £157,000 (equivalent to £1,247,000 in 2024).

Arthur and his wife Jesse were survived by their two daughters. Their elder daughter, Lady Jane Heaton, was a renowned beauty and celebrated hostess. In 1943, she joined the Women's Royal Naval Service, and was selected to go to the Stanmore outstation of Bletchley Park, where she worked with the German code-breaking group that operated the Enigma Machines during the Second World War. In 1945 she married Peter Heaton, a Clerk in the House of Lords, and lived in a house in Ralston Street, Chelsea. She had one son, Mark Heaton, who was born in 1948. She was divorced from Peter Heaton in 1952, and lived in Greece in the late 1950s, before settling in La Garde-Freinet in Provence, 15 kilometres north of Saint-Tropez. She purchased and renovated a deconsecrated 11th-century Chapel in the Village, and continued to be known as a society hostress for the remainder of her life. She died in 1992, and was survived by her son and five grandchildren.

Arthur and Jesse's younger daughter, Lady Martha Ponsonby, worked as a nurse during World War II. In 1950 she married Ashley Ponsonby, son of Sir Charles Ponsonby, 1st Baronet, with whom she had four sons. Ashley had served in the Coldstream Guards in North Africa and Italy during the Second World War, and was stationed in Bermuda during the late 1940s. At the time of their marriage he worked at the Merchant Bank Helbert Wagg.

Lady Martha and Ashley and lived at her husband's ancestral estate at Woodleys, Oxfordshire, which borders the Blenheim Palace estate. Ashley succeeded to the Ponsonby Baronetcy following his father's death in 1976, becoming Sir Ashley Ponsonby, 2nd Bt. Woodleys House and Estate had been in possession of the Ponsonby baronets since 1881, and the family continued to play a prominent role in Oxfordshire public life during Lady Martha's lifetime, with her husband serving as Deputy Lieutenant of Oxfordshire from 1974 to 1980, and Lord Lieutenant of Oxfordshire from 1980 to 1996. He was created a Knight Commander of the Royal Victorian Order by Queen Elizabeth II in 1993. Sir Ashley and Lady Martha Ponsonby both died in 2010.

Peerage of Ireland
Preceded by George Butler	Marquess of Ormonde; 1949–1971	Succeeded by Charles Butler
