= Arthur Williams (priest) =

The Ven. Arthur Charles Williams (8 July 1899 – 23 September 1974) was an Anglican priest, the Archdeacon of Bodmin from 1962 to 1969.

Williams was educated at Truro Cathedral School and served in the First World War; he was a prisoner throughout 1918. He was ordained in 1922 after a course of study at the College of the Resurrection, Mirfield. After curacies at St Clement's, Barnsbury and St Mary, Penzance, he was Vicar of Stratton from 1932 to 1939, when he became a Chaplain to the Forces. In 1945, he returned to St Mary's and served as its Vicar until his archdeacon's appointment.

== Notes ==
Church of England titles
Preceded by William Henry Prior	Archdeacon of Bodmin; 1962–1969	Succeeded by Conrad John Eustace Meyer
