= George Butler, 5th Marquess of Ormonde =

The Most Honourable James George Anson Butler
- Marquess of Ormonde
- Tenure: 4 July 1943 – 21 June 1949
- Predecessor: Arthur Butler, 4th Marquess of Ormonde
- Successor: Arthur Butler, 6th Marquess of Ormonde
- Born: 18 April 1890
- Died: 21 June 1949 (aged 59)
- Noble family: Butler dynasty
- Spouse: The Hon. Sybil Inna Mildred Fellowes
- Issue: James Anthony Butler, Viscount Thurles (1916–1940); Lady Moyra Rosamond Butler (1920–1959)
- Father: James Arthur Wellington Foley Butler, 4th Marquess of Ormonde
- Mother: Ellen Stager

James George Anson Butler, 5th Marquess of Ormonde (18 April 1890 – 21 June 1949) was the son of James Arthur Wellington Foley Butler, 4th Marquess of Ormonde and American heiress Ellen Stager, daughter of Union General Anson Stager.

== Biography ==
=== Early life ===
George Butler was born at 21 Park Lane, Mayfair, the home of his paternal grandmother the Dowager Marchioness of Ormonde. His father Lord Arthur Butler was the younger brother and heir-presumptive of James Butler, 3rd Marquess of Ormonde. At the time of George's birth Lord Ormonde had been married for eighteen years but had not fathered any sons; as a result George's succession to the Ormonde family titles and estates was considered a likely eventuality.

George's mother Lady Arthur Butler was an American heiress, and her fortune allowed his parents to acquire the lease of a London House at 7 Portman Square in 1899, as well as the freehold of a medium-sized Country Manor with 170 acres at Gennings Park in Kent in 1901. As a boy he, along with his parents, were present Kilkenny Castle during the visit of King Edward VII and Queen Alexandra in 1904.

George completed his schooling at Harrow, before enrolling at the Royal Military College, Sandhurst. He joined the 1st Life Guards regiment and saw active service during the First World War, during which he was wounded. He retired from the British Army in 1920, but retained the Rank of Major in the Reserve of Officers.

=== Inheritance and Estates ===
Upon the death of his uncle, James Butler, 3rd Marquess of Ormonde, George's father Lord Arthur became the 4th Marquess of Ormonde. As the oldest son and heir to the family titles, George became entitled to use the courtesy title Earl of Ossory, which he was known by until his father's death in 1943. Under the terms of the 3rd Marquess' Will, Lord Ossory inherited a life interest in the family seat of Kilkenny Castle and several other estates traditionally owned by the Marquess of Ormonde. This was made in an attempt to avoid burdening the Estate with death duties for both the 3rd and 4th Marquesses. His father, the 4th Marquess, was supported by the independent wealth of his American wife, Ellen Stager.

The family's English estates were sold in the early 1920s to pay off the death duties payable on the estates following the death of Ossory's Uncle; some £160,000 in taxes, charges and administration fees were payable by the estate, which was valued at approximately £400,000 to £450,000. In addition to the significant costs charged on the estate after the Third Marquess' death, George was also required to make substantial annual outlays from the estate income to his aunt and uncles.

Under the terms of their marriage settlement, The Third Marquess' widow Elizabeth, Dowager Marchioness of Ormonde was entitled to a life annuity of £3,000 from the Ormonde Estates. Under the terms of his will, the Third Marquess of Ormonde had provided for additional annuities of £3,000 to George's father Arthur Butler, 4th Marquess of Ormonde for life, and £275 to Lord Theobald Butler, which would also be payable to Lord Theobald's wife during her lifetime if she outlived her husband.

==== Ireland ====
The bulk of the Irish landed estates of the Butlers of Ormonde had been sold in 1903 under the Wyndham Land Acts. When Lord Ossory inherited the life-tenancy of the Ormonde Settled Estates Trust in 1919, the family's Irish Landholding had been reduced to 95 acres in and around Kilkenny Castle, 491 acres at Dunmore Park, 900 acres at Garryricken, and some 5,630 acres of woodland (mostly used for forestry and shooting) at the family's shooting lodge at Ballyknockane, Tipperary.

In March of 1921 the 239-acre Garryricken House estate, and an adjoining 277-acre estate which had already been divided into 14 separate lots were sold at the behest of Lord Ossory and his Uncle's Executors.

==== Kilkenny Castle ====
Following his uncle's death in 1919, Lord and Lady Ossory took up residence at Kilkenny Castle in 1920.

Surviving records from the 1926 Irish Free State census show that in 1926 the Ossory's employed ten servants who lived at the Castle, including a housekeeper, cook, three housemaids, one kitchen maid, a lady's maid, dairy maid, gate lodge keeper, and another male whose role was listed as an unspecified domestic servant (likely a Butler). Lord Ossory also employed chauffeur, motor driver, head gardener and three gardeners who lived in nearby buildings situated on The Parade in Kilkenny City.

The combination of rising taxes and decline income, as well as large death duties levied on the estate in 1919 placed an ever-increasing strain on Lord Ossory's ability to maintain Kilkenny Castle as a private residence. A number of family charges made under the Will and Marriage Settlement of the Third Marquess placed further strain on the falling income of the estate; between 1919 and 1927, the cost of these charge averaged between £2,500 and £4,500. The gradual decline in the family's ability to pay for the Castle is reflected in the outlays which were made on general maintenance and living costs; in 1904 this amount was some £4,400, but this had fallen to £2,166 in the 1920s, and approximately £1,200 in the early 1930s.

Owing to the increasing financial burden of maintaining the castle as a private home, Lord and Lady Ossory vacated Kilkenny Castle in 1935, and thereafter used the family shooting lodge Ballyknockane Lodge, Tipperary as their primary residence during the months of the year they spent in Ireland. Much of the contents of the castle were sold in 1935 and the castle was left neglected during the late 1930s. In 1940 the Castle was requisitioned by the Irish Military authorities. In 1947 George sold the contents of the castle's Muniment Room to the Irish State for £20,000; at the time of their sale they were reputed to be the largest single collection of Medieval deeds and records in Ireland. His brother and successor Arthur Butler, 6th Marquess of Ormonde later obtained retrospective approval from the High Court of Ireland for the sale, as the contents of the muniment room were legally held within the Ormonde Settled Estates Trust, which George had only held a life interest in.

===== 1922 Siege of Kilkenny Castle =====
During the broader slide towards civil war in spring 1922, Kilkenny Castle was briefly occupied by anti-Treaty Irish Republican Army (“Irregular”) forces before being retaken by Pro-Treaty (“Free State”) troops whilst Lord and Lady Ossory were in residence. On 28 April 1922, Irregulars seized key buildings in Kilkenny and by the morning of 2 May a detachment of twenty-two had entered the castle courtyard and ordered Lord Ossory and his household to evacuate. Ossory refused, sheltering with his staff inside the castle while Free State reinforcements—some two hundred soldiers transported from Dublin and supported by an armoured car—began isolating and bombarding the anti-Treaty positions. Sporadic sniper fire and exchanges around high points such as St Canice’s tower continued through 2–3 May until the armoured car breached the main gate on the evening of 3 May, precipitating the surrender of the Irregulars. Remarkably, no fatalities were recorded, though property damage within the castle was later estimated at nearly £1,000. In his diary Ossory recalled his decision to remain—to prevent looting and destruction—and noted the unusually cordial treatment of the captured Irregulars, who were released on 5 May and entertained by local officers before dispersing to other anti-Treaty units.

== Marriage and descendants ==
He married the Hon. Sybil Inna Mildred Fellowes, daughter of William Henry Fellowes, 2nd Baron de Ramsey and Lady Rosamond Fellowes, Baroness de Ramsey, on 23 February 1915. The Fellowes and Butlers seem to have been old family friends; George's grandmother Frances, Marchioness of Ormonde, attended the wedding of Sybil's parents in 1877. His parents, then Lord and Lady Arthur Butler, settled an annuity of £1,100 on George and Sybil, with £600 to be paid to Sybil for her life if George predeceased her. Sybil received a dowry of £2,000 from her father Lord de Ramsay, an annuity of £400, and a fifth-share of her mother's £30,000 marriage settlement to be paid on her mother's death as part of the settlement. Following her father's death in 1925, Lady Ossory's settlement was increased to £17,500 under the terms of his will. In 1929 Lady Ormonde settled an additional £15,000 in Trust to George and Sybil, which provided for an additional £400 annuity for Sybil in the event of George's death. They had two children:

- James Anthony Butler, Viscount Thurles (1916–1940), died unmarried serving in Second World War as Driver, Royal Army Service Corps
- Lady Moyra Butler (1920–1959) married (1) Charles Weld-Forester and (2) Count Guy van den Steen de Jehay.
  - Piers Weld-Forester (1946 - 1977)
  - Gerard van den Steen (b. 1949) (m. Patricia Delloye)
    - Moyra van den Steen
    - Ségolène van den Steen
    - Géraldine van den Steen

Lord and Lady Ossory were recorded as living at 19 Gloucester Place, St Marylebone, London in 1920.

Lady Ormonde's mother, Lady Rosamond Spencer-Churchill was the daughter of John Spencer-Churchill, 7th Duke of Marlborough, the aunt of Charles Spencer-Churchill, 9th Duke of Marlborough (who was married to the most famous of the American 'Dollar Princesses', Consuelo Vanderbilt) and the sister of Lord Randolph Churchill, father of British Prime Minister Winston Churchill. Lady Ormonde was therefore the first cousin of Winston Churchill.

Lady Moyra married, firstly, Charles Weld-Forester (who was the son of Major Hon. Edric Weld-Forester (who in turn was the son of the 5th Baron Forester of Willey Park) and Lady Victoria Wynn-Carington (who was the daughter of the 1st Marquess of Lincolnshire and a Lady-in-Waiting to Mary of Teck) on 20 April 1940. They had one son, Piers Edric Weld-Forester. The couple were divorced in 1948, and on 3 August of the same year, she married Count Guy Jacques van den Steen de Jehay, a Belgian nobleman.

Lord Ormonde's descendants include two grandsons and three great-granddaughters. His elder grandson Piers Weld-Forester was a prominent figure in London society in the late 1960s and early 1970s. Described as a 'playboy in the true sense of the word', he was briefly the boyfriend of Princess Anne in 1971 and went on to become a motorcycle racer. He was killed in a motorcycle crash in 1977. During his lifetime, Piers was one of the last remaining male members of the Butler Dynasty, along with his great-uncle Arthur Butler, 6th Marquess of Ormonde and first cousin twice-removed Charles Butler, 7th Marquess of Ormonde. Upon the transfer of the family's ancestral home Kilkenny Castle to the local government in 1967, the remainder of the Ormonde Family Trust was wound up and split equally between the 6th Marquess, Charles Butler (later 7th Marquess) and Piers.

== Later life ==
In 1939 Lord and Lady Ossory were recorded as living in inner-northern London at No. 30 St John's Wood Park. Despite the reduced circumstances of the family, a Butler, Cook, Housemaid, Kitchenmaid, and Lady's Maid were also recorded as living at this address.

Lord and Lady Ossory hosted a large ball at the London townhouse of the Marquess and Marchioness of Ormonde, 11 Bryanston Square, in June 1938. This dance was a joint coming-of-age party for their son Anthony Viscount Thurles, as well as a debutante coming-out celebration for the daughter Lady Moyra. The guest list reported in newspapers at the time includes multiple prominent individuals from British and American High Society during the late 1930s, including American Ambassador Joseph Kennedy, Kathleen Kennedy, the-then Mistress of the Robes the Duchess of Northumberland, the Queen's Lord Chamberlain David Ogilvy, 12th Earl of Airlie, John Spencer-Churchill, 10th Duke of Marlborough, Lord Carisbrooke, Lady Iris Mountbatten, William Wentworth-Fitzwilliam, 7th Earl Fitzwilliam, Viscount Curzon, Viscountess Coke, Major Jack and Lady Gwendoline Churchill, Clarissa Churchill, the Earl Spencer and The Hon. Pamela Digby.

=== Second World War ===
Following the outbreak of the Second World War, both of Lord Ormonde's children enlisted with the war effort; Viscount Thurles was a Driver with the Auxiliary Territorial Service, Lady Moyra as a Driver with the British Red Cross Ambulance Service. Lord Thurles, who had been in poor health since a car accident in 1935, travelled to Ryde on the Isle of Wight in mid-to-late April 1940 for a period of convalescence. After briefly returning to London to perform the role of Usher at the wedding of his sister Lady Moyra Butler to Capt Charles Weld-Forester in London on 1 May 1940, Lord Thurles' health began to deteriorate sharply on 3 May, and he was removed to the Vectis Nursing Home in Ryde on 6 May.

His sister and brother-in-law were reportedly at his bedside when he died on 9 May, but his parents Lord and Lady Ormonde were unable to reach Ryde before his passing. His remains were cremated in Southampton on Friday 10 May 1940, and interred at the family grave at Kilkenny Castle.

In October 1943 Lord and Lady Ormonde leased a new London home at Flat No. 53 in Orchard Court, Portman Square. The top-floor flat had previously been occupied by John Beresford, 5th Baron Decies.

=== Death and estate ===
George Butler, 5th Marquess of Ormonde died at his Irish residence Ballyknockane Lodge on 21 June 1949. His funeral was held at St Canice's Cathedral in Kilkenny City on 24 June, and his remains were interred at the family burial grounds in the Park at Kilkenny Castle.

The gross value of Lord Ormonde's personal estate in England was valued at £26,884; however the net value was £0. His personal estate in Ireland was valued at approximately £11,800; the sole beneficiary of his personal estate was his only surviving child Comtesse Moyra van den Steen de Jehay, who inherited part of the art collection kept at Kilkenny Castle. Moyra sold much of her father's estate at Auction in Dublin in January 1953. Contemporary newspaper articles report that the auction included over 100 oil paintings from George's collection.

As he had outlived his only son, George's younger brother Lord Arthur Butler succeeded to the family title's and the life-tenancy of the Ormonde Settled Estates Trust. Many family heirlooms held in the Trust were exempt from Estate Duty upon George's death; following Arthur's death in 1971 much of the family silver was transferred to the British Government in lieu of inheritance tax.

Peerage of Ireland
Preceded by James Arthur Butler	Marquess of Ormonde; 1943–1949	Succeeded by James Arthur Butler
