= State Line Trail =

Hiking trail in Michigan, United States

The State Line Trail is a 107.1-mile (172.4 km) hiking trail in Michigan. Michigan's longest continuous trail as of 2025, it creates a non-highway right-of-way through the western third of the Upper Peninsula. The trail uses a section of the former roadbed of the Chicago and North Western Railway. Proceeding from west to east, the trail departs Wakefield, at a point adjacent to U.S. Route 2. After passing through Gogebic County from west to east, the trail enters Iron County. At the trail's eastern end, the unincorporated community of Stager in Iron County, the trail serves thickly wooded land parcels within the Copper Country State Forest.

The State Line Trail uses more than 50 bridges to cross the humid, temperate forested lands of the western Upper Peninsula. The state of Michigan describes the tree life of the trail's right-of-way as being dominated by aspen, birch, maple, beech, and hemlock. A state of Michigan description recommends the State Line Trail for use by bikers, hikers, horseback riders, and snowmobilers. Bicyclists should be aware of trail conditions. The relatively unimproved roadbed of the Trail is not currently recommended for road bicycles.

The state of Michigan calls the State Line Trail "Michigan's longest and reddest rail-trail," because it crosses over and utilizes a rocky roadbed that was historically rich in red iron ore. The trail is named in honor of the Michigan–Wisconsin state boundary line, which the trail closely follows.

== Legacy ==
The State Line Trail is a lengthy, repurposed stretch of railroad right-of-way once used by the Chicago-based Chicago and Northwestern Railway (C&NW). At the time when standard time zones were being drawn throughout the United States, railroad corporations and their schedules played a key role in determining which locations were assigned to different time zones. After many changes to time zone boundary lines, almost all of Michigan was assigned to the Eastern Time Zone. However, four counties in the Upper Peninsula, historically, got much of their railroad service from the C&NW. These four counties, which include Gogebic County and Iron County, had developed a longtime attachment to the Chicago-oriented Central Time Zone. At these counties' request, they continue in that time zone today. The State Line Trail is in the Central Time Zone in its entirety.
