= Gennings Park =

House in Hunton, Maidstone, Kent, UK

Coordinates: 51°13′36″N 0°28′10″E

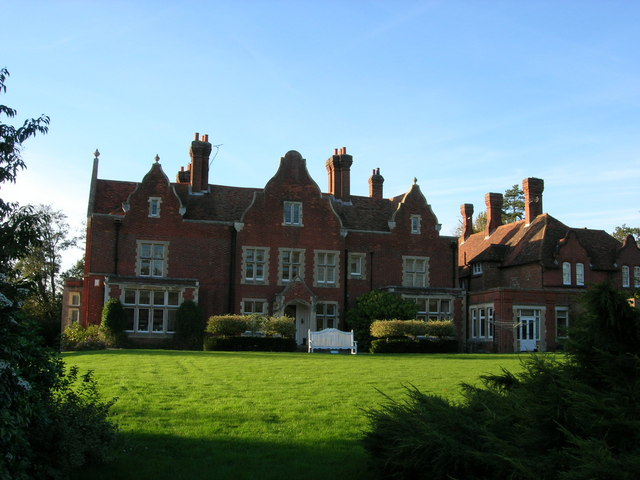
- Gennings Park, Hunton, Kent

- Location within Kent

General information
- Status: Private residence
- Location: Hunton, Kent, England

Gennings Park (sometimes spelt Jennings, and referred to as Gennings House or Gennings Court), located on Lughorse Lane near Hunton, Kent, is a Grade II listed house which was built between 1727 and 1745. The home was listed on 5 December 1984 (English Heritage Legacy ID: 432086). The document indicates that the house "possibly incorporating part of a late C16 or C17 house" was extensively modified in the subsequent years, and was "thought to be the setting for Pride and Prejudice, although this claim remains unverified. The house was seriously damaged by fire in March 2024.

== History and Occupants ==
=== Early occupants ===
In the mid to late 18th century, the house was purchased by Sir Walter Roberts, 6th Bt. His only child, Jane Roberts, inherited the house upon his death. Jane Roberts married George Beauclerk, 3rd Duke of St Albans (a great-grandson of Charles II of England). The 3rd Duke and Duchess of St Albans had no children, and the Duchess died in 1778. The Duchess bequeathed the property to a Miss Davies, who in turn sold it to the Dowager Lady Twysden, who was recorded as the owner of the property in 1797.

=== Sir Henry Campbell-Bannerman ===
In 1871 the Liberal politician Henry Campbell-Bannerman inherited Gennings Park from his uncle, Henry Bannerman, and the Campbell-Bannermans kept the house as their country residence until 1887; Gennings then formed part of the larger Hunton Court Estate, although the main house, Hunton Court was occupied by Henry Bannerman's widow Mary Bannerman until her death in 1894.

Upon his death in 1908, newspapers reported that the Gennings Park Estate was inherited by his nephew James Campbell-Bannerman inherited the estate in 1908. Sir Henry and Lady Campbell-Bannerman vacated the property in 1887. Following Sir Henry's death in 1908 newspaper reports suggested that the Gennings Park Estate formed part of his estate; however, other modern sources suggest that the house was first leased in 1888, then sold to the tenant in 1890. John Alfred Spender's 1923 biography of Sir Henry Campbell-Bannerman states that he sold Gennings in 1887.

==== 1887 - 1901 ====
The House was listed to be let in November 1887; the description of the house in The Daily Telegraph included the description: Hall, three reception rooms, billiard room, smoking room, eight principal bed rooms, three dressing rooms, 10 secondary bed rooms, kitchen, scullery, panty, butler's room, &c. Stabling for seven horses, carriage houses, coachman's house, &c. Walled-in gardens, containing greenhosuse, vinvery, peach and melon houses, &c. Hay barn, cowhouse, stable, &c., There are also pleasure grounds and about 37 acres of land, with shooting over 800 acres. FURNISHED.

Following the Campbell-Bannermans' departure in 1887, the house was lived in by John Bazley White, who lived in the house until at least 1893. The 1891 United Kingdom Census return for Gennings and its estate cottages records that the household included 19 domestic servants. In 1895 the occupants of the house were Conservative MP and distiller Sir Frederick Seager Hunt, 1st Bt and his wife. In June 1901 the Evening Standard Newspaper reported that Gennings Park, near Maidstone, had been sold via private treaty by Messrs. Hamptons, although at the time of the 1901 United Kingdom Census, held on 31 March, John Bazley White and his family had returned to Gennings, and employed a household of 10 domestic servants.

=== Marquesses of Ormonde: 1901 - 1955 ===
The identities of the purchasers of the property in 1901 were most likely Lord Arthur Butler and Lady Arthur Butler; surviving records demonstrate that the couple occupied Gennings with their household as early as 1902. Lord Arthur was the younger brother and heir to James Butler, 3rd Marquess of Ormonde; in 1887 he had married the wealthy American heiress Ellen Stager, daughter General Anson Stager, whose inheritance allowed the family to maintain a country home as well as a London residence at No. 7 Portman Square. Gennings Park continued to be the couple's country seat after Lord Arthur succeeded as the Marquess of Ormonde following his older brother's death in 1919; the family's ancestral seat, Kilkenny Castle, had been bequeathed to Arthur's son George Butler, Earl of Ossory with Arthur's blessing by the 3rd Marquess of Ormonde. Lord and Lady Ormonde continued to divide their time between Gennings and Portman Square; from 1925 to 1939 their London residence was No. 11 Bryanston Square. The 1911 United Kingdom census records that the couple employed a household staff of 11 servants at Gennings Park, which had increased to 13 by the time of the 1921 United Kingdom census. At the time of the 1939 Register of England and Wales the household at Gennings included 11 servants, and an "indoor" staff of eight servants was maintained during the later 1940s.

Arthur Butler, 4th Marquess of Ormonde died in 1943, and his widow Ellen Butler, Dowager Marchioness of Ormonde retained ownership of Gennings, where she continued to live until her death in 1951. In 1944 her younger son Lord Arthur Butler (6th Marquess of Ormonde from 1949) and his family also took up residence at Gennings. Ellen bequeathed the Gennings Estate to Arthur Butler, 6th Marquess of Ormonde. From 1952 to 1955 Lord Ormonde served as a Deputy lieutenant to the Lord Lieutenant of Kent.

From mid-December 1954 the estate was being advertised as for sale. Its purchase by company director Vernon Christopher Hayes was finalised in late April 1955. An article published in Country Life reporting on the sale described the estate as comprising "a house with 20 bedrooms, a period farm-house and model farm, 16 cottages and 173 acres."

In March 1955 the 6th Marquess of Ormonde had purchased a new country manor, Cantley House, in Wokingham, Berkshire, which remainded as his country home until his death in 1971.

=== 1955 to present ===
The House was later listed for sale in May 1982, with the estate described as being 166 acres, with valuable orchards.

In 1987 a development application was approved to subdivide the Main House into two self-contained dwellings. The submission recorded that the eastern side of the house dated from the 17th century, with an 18th-century western extension and a late-19th-century Jacobean-style re-fronting. Internally, the whole house had been “Georgianized” when the west wing was added, and substantial masonry walls and a lightwell already separated the two halves. Only two non-historic doorways linked them, so conversion simply involved blocking those openings and inserting discreet fire-break walls, with no further changes to existing staircases, kitchens or bathrooms.

The applicant also stressed that running and maintaining a house of this size—particularly the cost of heating its vast interior in winter—had become prohibitively expensive, and that a recent outbreak of dry rot in the western half had compounded the difficulty. By bringing the under‐used western wing back into economic use as a separate dwelling, the works would help secure the long-term upkeep of this Grade II–listed building.

==== 2024 Fire damage ====
On the evening of 8 March 2024 a major fire broke out at Gennings Park which caused substantial damage to the main house. The blaze, which began around 21:00 GMT in the first floor and roof space, led to the collapse of the roof and a partial structural collapse. Up to 50 firefighters and 16 fire engines attended; crews later worked through 9 March to bring it under control and prevent reignition. No injuries were reported. The house's owner was quoted as saying that a smoke alarm sounded before flames were seen through the roof, noting the house’s old timber and wind conditions.
