= Stager, Michigan =

- Unincorporated community
- Location within the state of Michigan
- Coordinates: 45°59′27″N 88°20′53″W
- Country: United States
- State: Michigan
- County: Iron
- Township: Mastodon Township
- Elevation: 1,339 ft (408 m)
- Time zone: UTC-6 (Central (CST))
  - Summer (DST): UTC-5 (CDT)
- ZIP code: 49920
- Area code: 906
- GNIS feature ID: 1617862

Stager is an unincorporated community in Iron County, in the U.S. state of Michigan.

== History ==
The community was named for Anson Stager, an official of the Western Union Telegraph Company. The site was once the location of a Chicago and North Western Railway railroad right-of-way and telegraph line that connected Stager with Wakefield, Michigan, but nothing of the line remains except the State Line Trail built on the former railroad's roadbed.
