= Arthur Butler, 4th Marquess of Ormonde =

The Most Honourable Arthur Butler KP PC (Ire)
- Marquess of Ormonde
- Tenure: 27 October 1919 – 4 July 1943
- Predecessor: James Butler, 3rd Marquess of Ormonde
- Successor: George Butler, 5th Marquess of Ormonde
- Born: 23 September 1849
- Died: 4 July 1943 (aged 93)
- Noble family: Butler dynasty
- Spouse: Ellen Stager
- Issue: Lady Evelyn Frances Butler (1887–1978); James George Anson Butler, 5th Marquess of Ormonde (1890–1949); James Arthur Norman Butler, 6th Marquess of Ormonde (1893–1971); Lady Eleanor Rachel Butler (1894–1969)
- Father: John Butler, 2nd Marquess of Ormonde
- Mother: Frances Jane Paget

James Arthur Wellington Foley Butler, 4th Marquess of Ormonde (23 September 1849 – 4 July 1943) was the son of John Butler, 2nd Marquess of Ormonde and Frances Jane Paget. At the time of his birth, he was the third son of Lord and Lady Ormonde, and was christened James Arthur Wellington Foley Butler. He was a godson of Arthur Wellesley, 1st Duke of Wellington. Through his mother he was a grandson of General The Hon. Sir Edward Paget and a great-grandson of Henry Paget, 1st Earl of Uxbridge and George Legge, 3rd Earl of Dartmouth.

== Career ==
Lord Arthur was educated at Harrow and at Trinity College, Cambridge. He later joined the army as a Lieutenant in the 1st Life Guards and served as a State Stewart to Henry Herbert, 4th Earl of Carnarvon while the latter was Lord Lieutenant of Ireland.

He was a Justice of the Peace in the county of Kent and a Deputy Lieutenant in the County Kilkenny. He was the 28th Hereditary Chief Butler of Ireland. Unlike previous generations, he did not live in the family seat of Kilkenny Castle as his son inherited it directly from his uncle. The contents of the castle were sold in 1935, and the castle was left neglected.

== Personal life ==
He married the American heiress Ellen Stager (daughter of Gen. Anson Stager, of Chicago, Illinois, co-founder of Western Union) on 8 March 1887 and had four children. Following their marriage, the couple were known as Lord and Lady Arthur Butler.

=== Residences ===
==== London ====
In 1891, Lord and Lady Arthur Butler resided at 21 Park Lane, London, the home of Lord Arthur's mother Frances Butler, Dowager Marchioness of Ormonde. They took a temporary residence in Cadogan Square in 1898. Their London residence was No. 7 Portman Square from 1899 until 1924, and from late 1925, they leased a larger London Townhouse at No. 11 Bryanston Square in London. 11 Bryanston Square remained their London home until at least 1938. The leasehold interest was sold by Ellen's executors in the mid-1950s.

==== Country homes ====
Lord and Lady Arthur leased Sandleford Priory, near Newbury, from at 1895 until September 1898. In 1901, they purchased a small country estate in Kent, Gennings Park.

The couple's purchase of their first freehold country residence after fourteen years of marriage followed the death of Lord Arthur's cousin George O'Callaghan, 2nd Viscount Lismore in 1899; Lord Lismore had reportedly informed his family that, following the deaths of his two sons, Lord Arthur Butler would be the heir to his estates (a 47,000-acre estate in Ireland centred on Shanbally Castle worth £18,435 annually). Following Lord Lismore's death in 1898, his will revealed that he had instead named Lord Arthur's nieces Lady Beatrice and Lady Constance Butler as co-beneficiaries of his estate. Gennings Park remained as the home of Lord and Lady Arthur Butler (Marquess and Marchioness of Ormonde after 1919) until their respective deaths in 1943 and 1951.In 1921, the UK Census recorded their household at Gennings included a Butler, Footman, Cook, Lady's Maid, three Housemaids, two Kitchen Maids, a Scullery Maid, and Pantry Boy.

Although Arthur succeeded his older brother as Marquess of Ormonde in 1919, Arthur's son George Butler, 5th Marquess of Ormonde inherited the bulk of the family estates to avoid double taxation. Lord Arthur seems to have requested that his older brother alter his will in favor George; records survive of a letter written by Lord Ormonde to George Butler dated 27 June 1916 outlining changes to his will which "your father has asked me to alter" which postponed Lord Arthur's use of the Ormonde Estate in favor of George, George's sons (at the time George's wife Sybil was pregnant with their only son, James Anthony Butler) and George's brother Arthur and his male issue. When he informed George of his elevation to be next-in-line to inherit the family's ancestral estates, the Third Marquess requested that:

1. George not make any alteration of the family seat, Kilkenny Castle, and shooting lodge, Ballyknockane Lodge, Tipperary without consulting Lord Arthur and obtaining his approval;
2. That Lord Arthur would have use of Plate and other articles "as he shall desire"; and,
3. That Lady Arthur, during the lifetime of Lord Arthur, would have use of any Family Jewels which Lord Ormonde had the power to dispose of.

=== Wealth ===
==== Personal Wealth ====
In the early 1890s Lord Arthur received a £500 annuity from his brother Lord Ormonde. Following the death of his mother in 1903, Arthur was named as the residuary legatee of her estate, and inherited approximately £10,000 of her £25,000 fortune in England and Ireland.

Following the death of his older brother in 1919, Arthur received a £3,000 annuity payable as a charge on the Ormonde Settled Estates Trust under the terms of Lord Ormonde's Will; this amount was reduced to £2,200 per year in the late 1920s. Following his death in 1943, the gross value of his estate for Probate in England was £104,258; the net value was £100,640 (£3,866,000 in 2025) from which £8,634 in death duties were paid.

==== Wife's Fortune ====
Arthur's wife Ellen was widely rumoured to possess a personal fortune amounting to US$1,000,000 (£200,000) at the time of their marriage in 1887; however her third-share of her father's estate was likely closer to $300,000 ($10,000,000 in 2025), equivalent to £60,000 in the 1880s. Her father, General Anson Stager, was an early pioneer of the use of the telegraph and was the chief of U.S. Military Telegraph during the Civil War.

In the 1920s, the sister of Ellen, Marchioness of Ormonde, Mrs Annie Stager Hickox (of Cleveland, Ohio), died in Monte Carlo. She left a total estate of $847,207, much of which was left to Lady Ormonde. Ellen retained control over her American wealth during the couples marriage; following her sisters' deaths in 1922 and 1923, her Trusts, based in the State of Ohio, were structured so that the net income was paid to Ellen and her husband Arthur in equal shares (after the deduction of small annuities to several American cousins and the income agreed in their children's respective marriage settlements). This income was approximately $30,000 each in 1925, which would equate to approximately £6,200 in 1925. and the Trusts were later restructured in 1929 so that life annuities of £6,000 each were payable to Arthur and Ellen. This arrangement lead to tax litigation in the early 1930s, as the British Commissioners for Taxation attempted to levy tax on the higher gross income of the Ohio Trust, rather than the £12,000 (£725,000 in 2025) combined American income of Lord and Lady Ormonde. The Ormondes were ultimately successful in an appeal of this decision in 1932.

== Issue ==
Arthur and his wife Ellen had four children:

- Lady Evelyn Frances Butler (20 December 1887 - 15 April 1978), married to Vice-Adm. Hon. Edmund Rupert Drummond, CB MVO RN (ret.), son of 10th Viscount Strathallan and brother of 15th Earl of Perth and has issue.
  - Anne Drummond (b. 30 June 1911)
  - Jean Constance Drummond (b. 20 August 1914)
  - James Ralph Drummond (b. 28 March 1918)
- James George Anson Butler, 5th Marquess of Ormonde (1890–1949)
  - James Anthony Butler, Viscount Thurles (b. 18 August 1916)
  - Lady Moyra Rosamund Butler (b. 2 December 1920)
- James Arthur Norman Butler, 6th Marquess of Ormonde (1893–1971)
  - Lady Jane Butler (b. 9 January 1925 - 1992)
  - Lady Martha Butler (b. 14 January 1926 - 2010)
- Lady Eleanor Rachel Butler (b. 24 April 1894 - 1969), married firstly Captain Edward Brassey Egerton and secondly William Henry Prior (known latterly as Lady Rachel Prior).

== Later life and death ==
Following the outbreak of the Second World War, the Ormondes vacated their London Residence at No. 11 Bryanston Square. The Blitz left parts of Bryanston Square in need of extensive repairs; a local report in March 1946 noted that several houses on the east side, including No. 11, were still awaiting reinstatement under the War Damage Commission scheme. Estate papers held at the National Archives record the post-war repairs carried out to Nos 10–12.

Arthur spent the final years of his life at his country estate Gennings Park in Kent. The 1939 Register of England and Wales records that the Ormonde Household continued to include 11 servants at the time of the survey, including a Housekeeper and Gardener. The house also hosted a number of evacuated schoolchildren and their schoolmaster. An "indoor" staff of eight servants was maintained during the 1940s.

Ormonde died in 1943 at the age of 93; as a newborn he had been christened as a godson of the Victor of the Battle of Waterloo, and he had lived to see German Bombers flying over Kent during the Battle of Britain. He was succeeded by his son George Butler as Marquess of Ormonde and Chief Butler of Ireland. His ashes lie in Ulcombe, Kent.

== See also ==
- Butler dynasty

Peerage of Ireland
Preceded by James Edward Butler	Marquess of Ormonde; 1919–1943	Succeeded by James George Butler
