= William Prior (priest) =

Anglican priest

William Henry Prior AKC (30 September 1883 – 17 November 1969) was an Anglican priest. He was the Archdeacon of Bodmin from 1956 until 1961.

Prior was trained for the priesthood at King's College London and ordained in 1908. After a curacy at Chipping Barnet he was the Rector of Beachburg, Ontario then St Barnabas’, Ottawa. Returning to England he was Vicar of Saltash from 1925 to 1956 when he took up his appointment as Archdeacon of Bodmin.

He married Eleanor Rachel, 5th child and 2nd daughter of James Butler, 4th Marquess of Ormonde on 1 July 1961; and held the honorific style Archdeacon Emeritus until his death.

Church of England titles
Preceded by John Wellington	Archdeacon of Bodmin; 1956–1961	Succeeded by Arthur Williams
