= Ballyknockane Lodge, Tipperary =

House in County Tipperary, Ireland

Ballyknockane Lodge (alternatively named Ormonde Lodge) is a two-storey former hunting and fishing lodge situated in the townland of Ballyknockane, County Tipperary, Ireland. It was constructed in 1867 for James Butler, 3rd Marquess of Ormonde, and designed by the noted architect Sir Thomas Newenham Deane. The building remained in the ownership of the Marquesses of Ormonde until the 1979, and continued used as a private residence.

== History ==
Ballyknockane Lodge was built in 1867 as a country retreat and base for shooting parties on the Ormonde estate, whose principal seat was Kilkenny Castle some 24 miles to the northeast. The £1,300 tender for the construction of the building was accepted in May 1866. Following the decision of George Butler, Earl of Ossory to vacate Kilkenny Castle in 1935, Ballyknockane became the family's Principal Irish Residence until 1949.

By 2007 the estate comprised over 5,000 acres of mountainous land on the southern slopes of Slievenamon, including approximately 4,000 acres of moorland managed for rough shooting of pheasant, woodcock and snipe, with limited deer hunting. Estate agents at that time also identified potential for commercial forestry and wind‐power development across two upland areas of the property.

Few original interior details survive, though fine teak-and-porcelain sanitary fittings by H J Magee of Kilkenny and a Gents of Leicester kitchen bellboard bearing hand-painted servant-call inscriptions remain. A courtyard of outbuildings includes stables, a coach-house converted to staff quarters with a first-floor billiard room, a mews with storage, wine cellar and a self-contained apartment, plus three Bórd Fáilte-standard holiday cottages (“Rose”, “Ivy” and “Primrose”).

The formal gardens and arboretum, covering some 50 acres, contain over 50 varieties of rhododendrons and azaleas watered by a clear stream, while a further 1,000 acres are leased to Coillte for forestry (lease expiry c. 2067). Clear views extend to the Comeragh and Galtee mountain ranges, and Clonmel lies eight miles to the south.

== Later ownership ==
George Butler, 5th Marquess of Ormonde died at Ballyknockane in 1949. The house was let in the late 1950s, and then described being in perfect repair, with three reception rooms, five bedrooms, two bathrooms, electricity, connected to a telephone network, with additional servants' quarters. The Ormonde Settled Estates Trust retained Ballyknockane Lodge until 1979, when it was acquired by Kenneth O’Reilly Hyland, a former director of the Central Bank of Ireland. In 2002 the estate was sold to an Irish-American businessman.

== Architecture ==
The lodge displays many features typical of mid-to-late nineteenth-century country houses. Constructed in an irregular plan, it is built of local stone under pitched slate roofs with overhanging bargeboards and cut-stone chimneystacks. The west gable is distinguished by a single round-headed window, while the remaining elevations feature square-headed openings. Adjoining the lodge to the south-west is a yard of outbuildings, including a two-storey range of stables under slate roofs and stone walls. The design is attributed to Thomas Newenham Deane, whose practice was influential in the Gothic Revival movement in Ireland.

== Current use ==
The lodge remains in private ownership and continues to function as a residence.
