= Ardfinnan Woollen Mills =

Wool mill in County Tipperary, Ireland

Coordinates: 52.311222°N 7.879583°W

Mulcahy Redmond (MR & Co.), originally established 1869, was a Mulcahy family owned woollen, worsted and garment manufacturing company at the Ardfinnan Woollen Mills that traded as Ardfinnan in the village of Ardfinnan, County Tipperary, Ireland. Ardfinnan Woollen Mills may date to the 12th century, as a monastic woollen mills.

A woollen and worsted mills, it became known as the last mills tied with Ireland's oldest and most famous wool exports from Waterford City. It was acclaimed for restoring local wool industry, early association with Savile Row, premium frieze and tweed patronised by royalty, melton for hunt coats, green tweed with the first Aer Lingus uniforms, worsted suitings with Éamon de Valera, knitting yarn with The Clancy Brothers, luxury handwoven tweed, ready-made suits and sport coats as the only factory on the island of Ireland completing all stages of production from fleece to clothing in the 20th century.

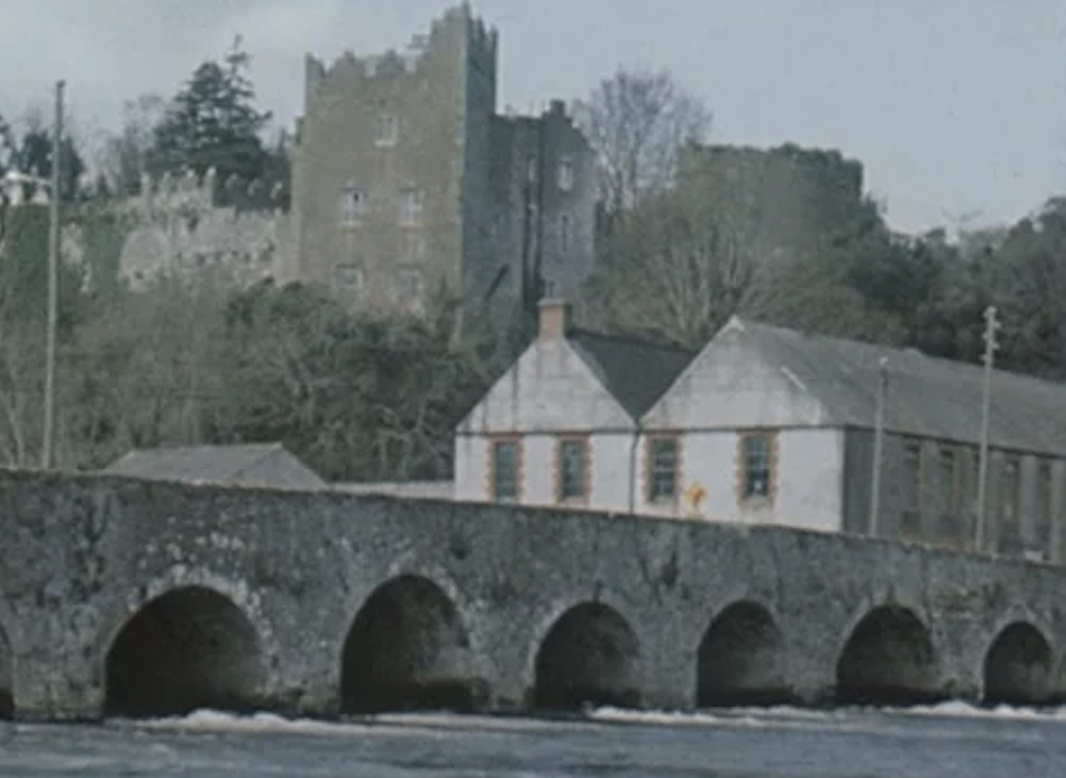
Watermill on bridge with Ardfinnan Castle and its knights' preceptory

== History ==
=== Early history ===
The mills on the River Suir adjoined an ancient monastery, attributed to Saint Finnian. Saint Carthage and his monks took refuge here c.632 AD, developing Ardfinnan Abbey and the village on the river bank, along with his great school of western learning at Lismore Abbey further south on the same path. This brought sheep for parchment and wool, weaving for vestments and milling for flour in the centre of the fertile valley. After Henry II visited the monastery in 1171, it became the earliest known inland preceptory of the Knights Templar, fortified with the royal Ardfinnan Castle, one of the first three Norman Crown castles in Ireland and completed by Prince John in 1185. It is believed that the Templars established the vertically-integrated Ardfinnan woollen mills with the introduction of water-powered fulling at the abbeys watermill, having introduced the first fulling mills in England alongside the Cistercians also by 1185. The first Cistercian monastery in the south of Ireland was neighboring Ardfinnan downstream at De Surio Abbey. Adjoining cottages of textile workers, extended from the fulling mill along Factory Hill Road to Saint Finnian's Church, becoming the medieval town, or burgage, of Ardfynan. Frieze cloth locally flourished with 13th to 16th century demand for woollen Irish cloaks to mainland Europe from the port of Waterford, where the Templars had free passage. Dyers principally ran fulling mills in this era and it is recorded that a freeman named William the Dyer lived in Ardfynan in 1295.

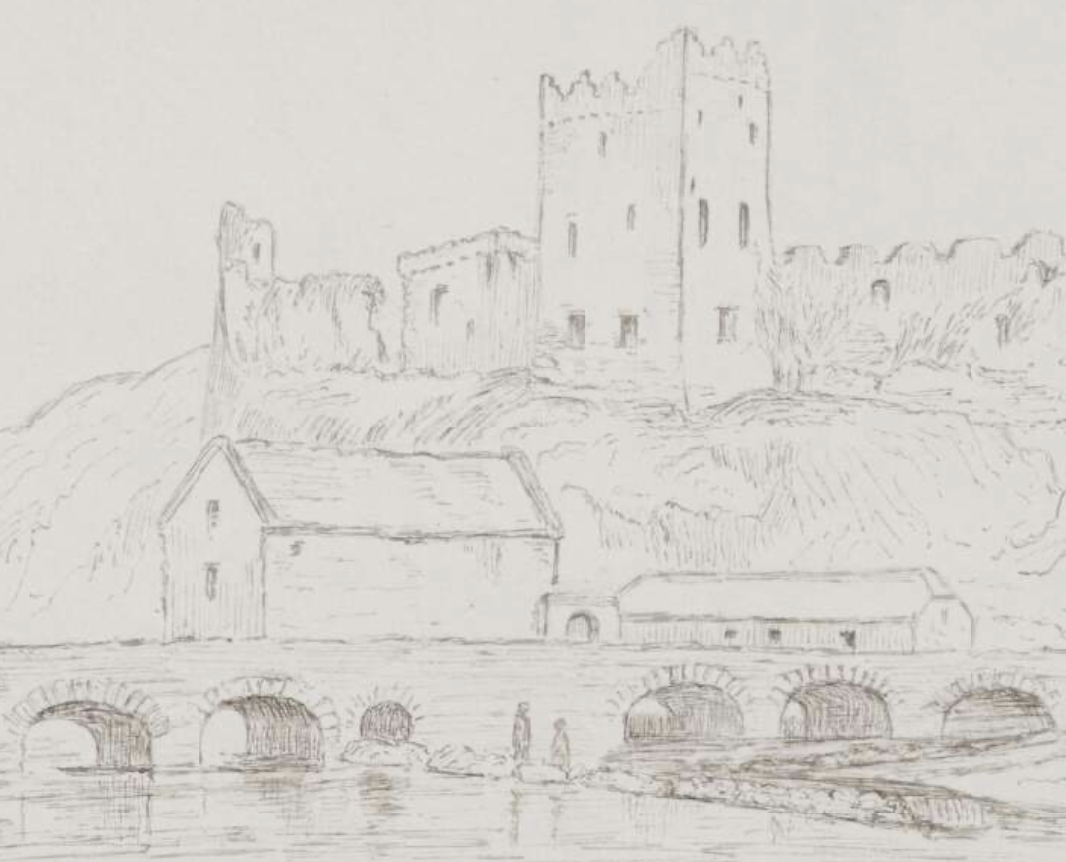
Watermill on bridge as it may have been situated since the time of William the Dyer

Following Trial of the Templars, Edward II granted pontage for three years to the "bailiffs and good men of Ardfynan" in 1311, supporting the mills that were built on the bridge, until the Knights Hospitaller took over. A Carmelite friary and Franciscan friary also established at either side of the river banks. Ardfynan was uniquely exempt from customs and sanctions from 1449 by act of the Parliament of Ireland. Subsumed by the Bishopric of Waterford and Lismore during the Reformation, the mills remained a valuable ecclesiastical asset until the 19th century. Strong traditions of hand-weaving and spinning in cottages on Factory Hill Road alongside the "woollen factory" continued into the 19th century, with Ardfinnan Clothing Club established after the devastation of the Great Famine as an annual used-clothing market. Traditionally the village green was used for tentering cloth and drying wool, from sheep in the surrounding valley and Galtee, Knockmealdown and Comeragh mountains.

=== Mulcahy family ===
The local Mulcahy family were clothiers to the first national mail coach and Ireland's largest army barracks in the 1790s at nearby Fermoy. The family worked with the Daly family of Rossmore Mills upstream when they showcased Irish frieze for gentlemen’s clothing and horse blankets internationally for the first time and made early connections with London’s Savile Row. This was achieved when they represented the Irish woollen industry among ten firms in 1851 at the Great Exhibition in London. Just four of these representatives were outside of Dublin and they solely represented County Tipperary. Rossmore Mills was formerly on the Knights Templar’s largest Irish landholding at Clonulty Preceptory adjacent to the sacred wool producing Cistercian Holycross Abbey. John Mulcahy and Mary Mulcahy (née. Daly) of Rossmore Mills, revived the "Ardfinnan woollen factory" from March 1869 from the adjoining Mill House below Ardfinnan Castle.

Ardfinnan was advantageously geographically situated and closer to Shanbally Castle were they sourced fine wool from the prestigious South Down and Merino crossbred flocks of Cornelious O'Callaghan. George O'Callaghan succeeded his father as the Queen’s representative for Tipperary as Lord Lieutenant of Tipperary and his second home from 1867 was on Old Burlington Street, adjacent to Savile Row. At Ardfinnan a waterwheel powered the old-fashioned fulling stocks in the watermill and employment was around a dozen. The Suir flowed through the watermill via an extensive weir and a short mill race before exiting under one of the 14 arches of the medieval Ardfinnan bridge. It was along the coach road from Dublin to Cork which introduced tourists, was serviced by steamtrain via Cahir and later steamboat to Waterford. The watermill was likely in this advantageous position since the construction of the bridge, soon after the castle in 1185.

Award of Commendation was given for frieze exhibited by John Mulcahy of Ardfinnan at the Irish Exhibition of Arts and Manufactures, 1882. In June 1883 he took lease of Castlegrace Mills, near Clogheen, to establish a third woollen mills, between Ardfinnan and Shanbally Castle.

On October 1, 1883 a fire gutted the main five-story watermill building at Ardfinnan and damaged Mulcahy's adjoining former family home at Mill House, with 50 to 100 workers affected. Two children trapped during the fire in the uppermost loft jumped from a window and were caught in the arms of a mill foreman and a constable, receiving minor injuries.

In 1884 Mulcahy was honored by Queen Victoria as a Commissioner of the Peace. The watermill was restored as a double-roofed structure, retaining the original walkout basement, engineered by a Dublin builder to house a water turbine built in New Jersey, United States by T.C. Alcott & Son. It was among only two other mills in Munster to use a water turbine, being Ashgrove Woollen Mills and Kerry Woollen Mills. The building was open plan with central supporting pillars, and had a monastic style bell for work hours, adjoining communal canteen and retained the much older castellated annex office with gothic door and gate that survived the fire. It was "fitted on an extensive scale with the most improved machinery known in England or America for the manufacture of the very best Irish tweeds". This included Cheviot tweed, the gold standard for tweed, from local sheep and shepherds that were supported by the Mulcahy family, in the Knockmealdown and Comeragh mountains on the Waterford Tipperary border uplands. Mulcahy overhauled Rossmore Mills until he sold the site in 1890. Mulcahy Redmond & Co. (MR & Co.) exhibited at the Royal Dublin Society Irish Artisans' Exhibition 1885. They advertised in the late 1880s as makers of Irish tweeds, friezes, blankets, shawls and railway rugs.

MR & Co. represented the Irish woollen industry among 12 firms at the Cork International Exhibition of 1902. It was reported as the last woollen mills on the River Suir, a river that had previously powered the first and the most wool mills in Ireland since at least the 17th century. Showcased were their specialties "the best Cheviots" tweeds renowned as "ne plus ultra", blue and black serges, clerical suitings, meltons (for riding jackets) friezes, ladies mantlings, locally handwoven homespuns adapted for "cyclists and tourist wear" and "Galtee travelling rugs", all produced from Irish wool.

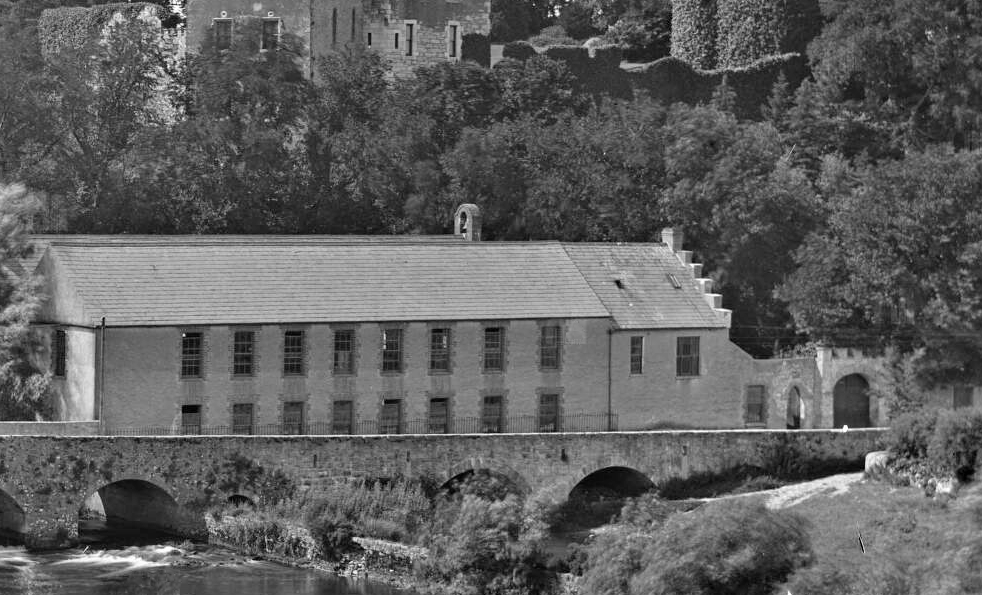
MR & Co. c.1890s. Note monastic style bell and adjoining castellated annex with gothic door and gate (right) predating other structures and demolished by the 1990s.

=== Galtee Motor Cloth ===
John Mulcahy’s first son Frank Mulcahy was born at the mills and attended Rockwell College and a West Yorkshire technical school. He married Kathleen Crean, whose family descended from the wool "merchant princes" of 16th century Sligo and who had revived the woollen industry in Clonmel also on the River Suir during the industrial revolution and were very personally and politically tied to Daniel O’Connell, who famously wore a frieze coat to represent the Irish people when he was the first Catholic to sit in the British Parliament. A politician and philanthropist Frank was also one of the first motorcar owners in the Tipperary region, with a Oldsmobile Curved Dash. Frank patented Galtee Motor Cloth in 1906, an innovation combining warmth with a unique waterproof-breathable functionality. Named after the Galtee Mountains and targeting the emerging motoring clothing market, it was advertised as "the warmest cloth ever made for motor coats and motor rugs". It was a layered cloth of traditional Irish frieze that the Mulcahy family had perfected and mohair inter-woven with merino. The weave was breathable when dry, described as hygienic, but as the surface became wet the weave contracted and became rainproof. This functionality was lacking in popular fur coats, rubber Mackintosh or cotton Burberry raincoats. It has similarities with Loden cloth. The Mulcahy's older Galtee rug or blanket, paid homage to the famous "Waterford rug" of the Middle Ages.

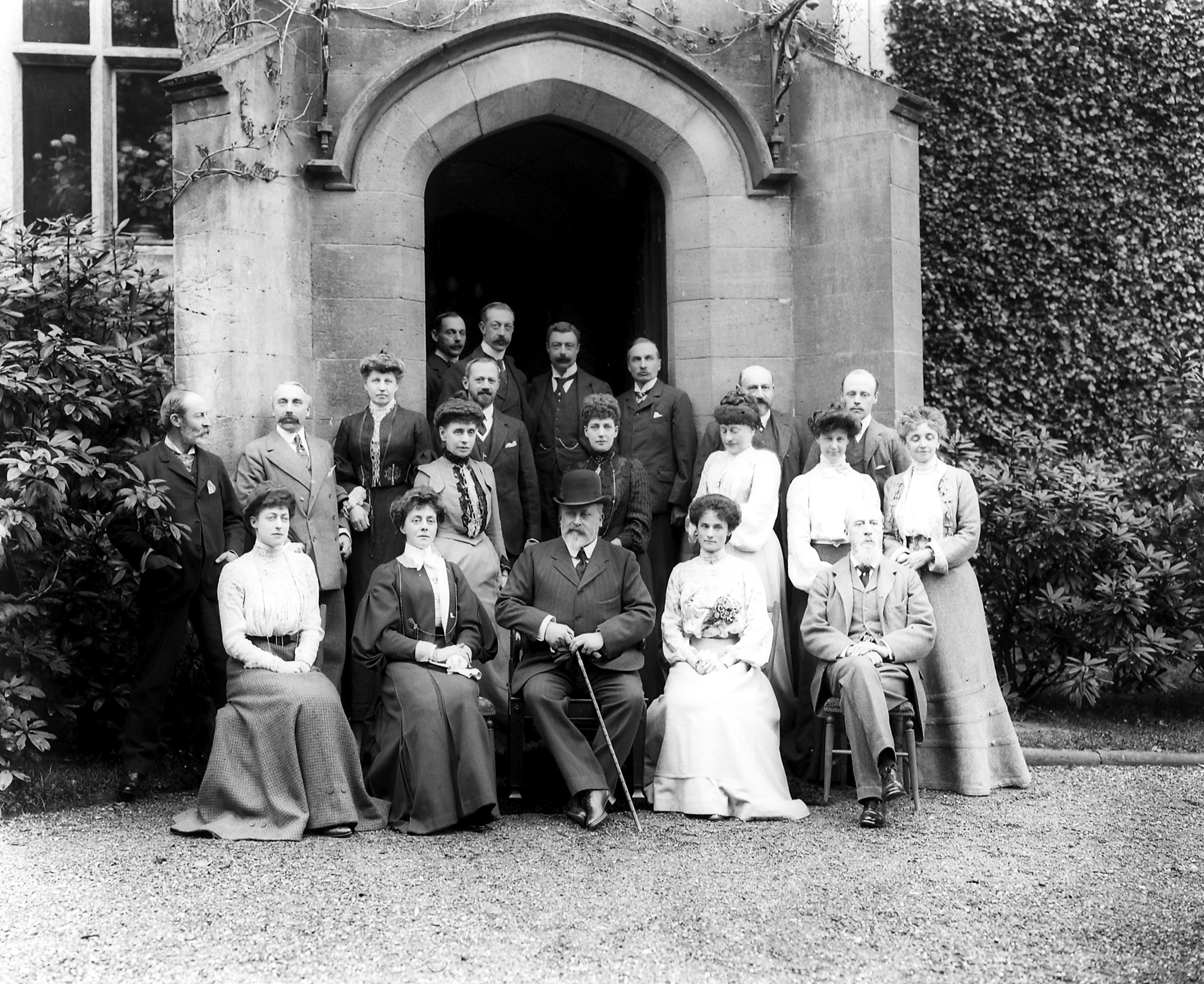
8th Duke of Devonshire in Ardfinnan tweed (on right) at Lismore Castle with King Edward VII, 1904.

In November 1906 King Edward VII ordered Galtee Motor Cloth from MR & Co. and had a motoring coat made from it at his respective Savile Row tailoring house, followed by an expression of his satisfaction. At the time, Edward VII's royal household was the first in the world to adopt the use of the motorcar. Edward VII, Queen Alexandra and Princess Victoria visited Ardfinnan Woollen Mills during their May 1904 private tour of Ireland by motorcar, en route between Shanbally Castle with its pedigree sheep on the Galtee mountains and Lismore Castle (sister castle of Ardfinnan Castle) over the Cheviot flocked Knockmealdown mountains. Their respective hosts, Lady Pole-Carew, Lady Constance Butler, Reginald Pole-Carew at Shanbally and the 8th Duke of Devonshire at Lismore were influential local patrons of the mills.

Galtee Motor Coats were first made and sold by Pim Bros department store, South Great George's Street, Dublin, with the Galtee Motor Coat as the highlight of their stall at Ireland's first motor show, the 1907 Dublin Motor Show. Irish motoring pioneer R.J. Mecredy wrote in 1909 "I have used one of these coats for several years" and praised the unique scientific qualities of the cloth in his book Health's Highway.

At the Irish International Exhibition MR & Co. displayed woollen and worsted goods alongside 'Motor Clothing, including our Speciality-"Galtee" Motor Cloth'. In 1908 the same Galtee Motor Frieze was showcased at the Franco-British Exhibition in London.

=== 1914–1960s ===
The War Office had contracts with MR & Co. throughout the First World War to produce khaki serge for their military uniforms, frieze for overcoats, and blankets. Early war contracts were lobbied for MR & Co. by John Cullinan (MP) in the House of Commons. They uniquely produced overcoat cloth for Tsar Nicholas II’s Imperial Russian Army in 1916. After the war, the mills expanded extensively on the opposite side of the road with new machinery and had the largest boiler in the south of Ireland, imported from Glasgow. Ardfinnan Suitings had prestige internationally in tailoring houses in London, Paris and New York. Frank Mulcahy died in 1920. His father John Mulcahy bought Ardfinnan Castle in 1921 and died in 1922.

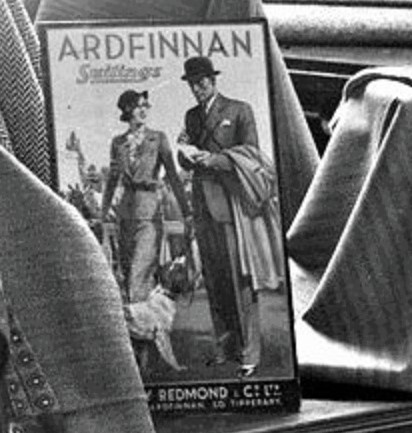
Ardfinnan Suitings placard, 1936

MR & Co. received exclusive commissions for the suits and overcoats for newly-appointed second Irish prime minister Éamon de Valera to wear in Switzerland representing Ireland at the League of Nations from 1932 to 1939, including both as president of the Council of the League of Nations in 1932 and president of the Assembly of the League of Nations in 1938. John Mulcahy’s second son William Mulcahy and MR & Co. accountant E.J. Shott were appointed in 1936 as first directors of Belgian firm General Textiles cotton mills, Athlone, but it didn't open until 1947 due to World War II.

The first Aer Lingus uniforms, designed by Waterford-raised Sybil Connolly were made from cloth designed and produced at MR & Co. in 1945. In 1948 Connolly's second iteration of the uniform in green Ardfinnan tweed became the airline's signature global hallmark.

Irene Gilbert, Ireland's first couturier, was from upstream of Ardfinnan at Thurles, County Tipperary and also used Ardfinnan tweeds throughout her career, continuing Ardfinnan's legacy with royal tailoring.

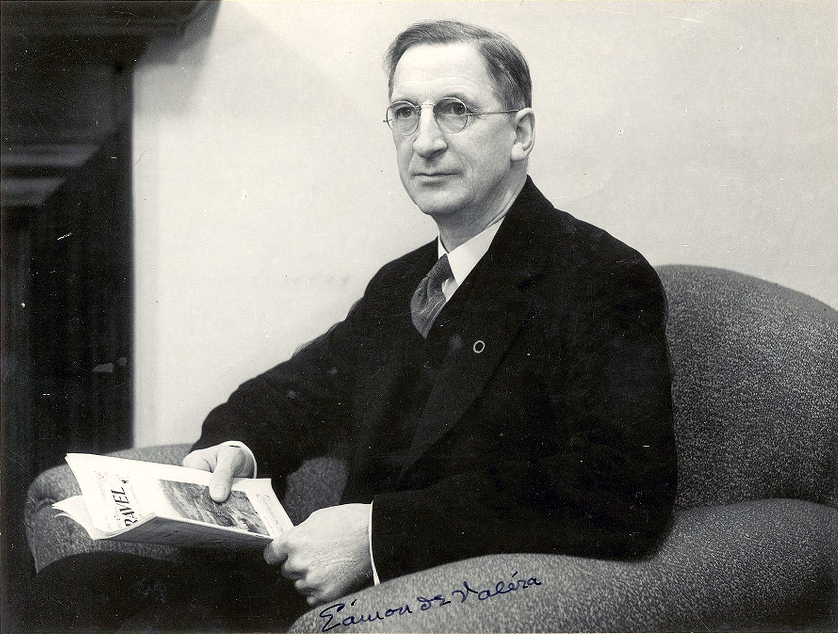
Taoiseach Éamon de Valera in Ardfinnan suitings, 1939.

From 1947 a ready-made clothing production line employing over 70 workers was added to the vertically-integrated mills, defining MR & Co. as the only factory on the island of Ireland completing all stages of clothing manufacture from raw fleece to finished garments. It made suits, overcoats, sports jackets and trousers under the Ardfinnan name and on commission for Irish brands. Employment exceeded 300 and under the direction of Frank Mulcahy’s sons John A. Mulcahy and Richard Mulcahy it was the most vertically-integrated textile factory on the island of Ireland. It also had a darning department for repairing customers' woollens. Richard Mulcahy was reported as president of the Association of Woollen and Worsted Manufacturers of Ireland in 1957 and showcased Irish tweed as an export on par with Irish whiskey at the 1957 New York International Trade Fair.

Ardfinnan House, 17 Trinity Street, Dublin 2, was the address of their wholesale store, showroom and office in the capital city. It was the first of its kind in Dublin, selling directly to tailors, drapers and fashion brands in the 1950s and 1960s. The sign "Ardfinnan House" remains on this building today. An older showroom was on South William Street and in the 1920s an agent was at Castle Market.

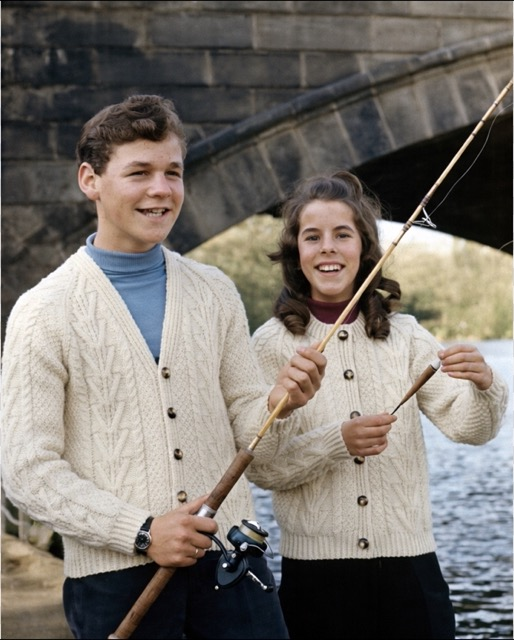
Aran design by the Ardfinnan brand

Ardfinnan Aran knitting patterns, yarns and kits were launched to challenge the then dominant British producers of Aran patterns and yarns. Its success coincided with American folk-revival band The Clancy Brothers from downstream Carrick-on-Suir, who wore Aran jumpers claimed to be made of Ardfinnan baínín yarn as their trademark from 1961. Around the same time MR & Co. patron Adele Astaire scouted local talented knitter Cyril Cullen to make haute couture knitted garments at her home in Lismore Castle for her guests which included ski wear for Jackie Kennedy and John F. Kennedy Jr. The following year Grace Kelly significantly popularised Aran knitwear for women after highly publicised photographs of her wearing Aran on a ski sled with her children during a family retreat in Switzerland. Another influential photoshoot of Kelly wearing Aran on her sailboat in Monaco that year further points to influence from the Lismore circle and the close friendship she had with Irene Gilbert.

The "Ardfinnan Sweater" featured on RTE in 1964 for the first televised knitting lesson in Ireland, demonstrated by Cullen. Another televised feature included Terry Wogan in Cullen's "Clancy Brother’s" design.

Luxury tweed was made by the hand-weaving department at the mills. To preserve weaving traditions in South Tipperary, a hand-weaving teacher had been employed for a long time for Clonmel technical school (now Mulcahy House) and in 1964 a training handloom was also acquired for Cahir.

In both 1961 and 1962, their Carrig Cashel tweed won the Premier London Award and Georgian Silver Cup at the Irish Export Centre on Regent Street, London. The same tweed was used by Neillí Mulcahy for her 1963 Cashel collection. A Gold Medal of Industrial Excellence was presented to John A. Mulcahy and tweed designer Eddie O’Flynn for MR & Co.'s bouclé tweed at the 1965 Leipzig Trade Fair in Germany, out of 350 entries from all fields of industry.

=== Redundancy ===
The firm increasingly relied on large foreign commissions, such as for Macy's in the USA and Hector Powe Ltd. prestigious made-to-measure in London. It also had a client reach as far as Australia, Finland, Sweden and Germany. With up to 500 people directly and non-directly dependent on the mills, it let go of its workforce in January 1973. Competitive disadvantages climaxing with Ireland's admission to the EEC were blamed. A protest in Clonmel led by the workers and Mulcahy family followed, including the youngest members of the family Desmond and Frank Mulcahy, as promises by government to protect the woollen industry were not upheld.

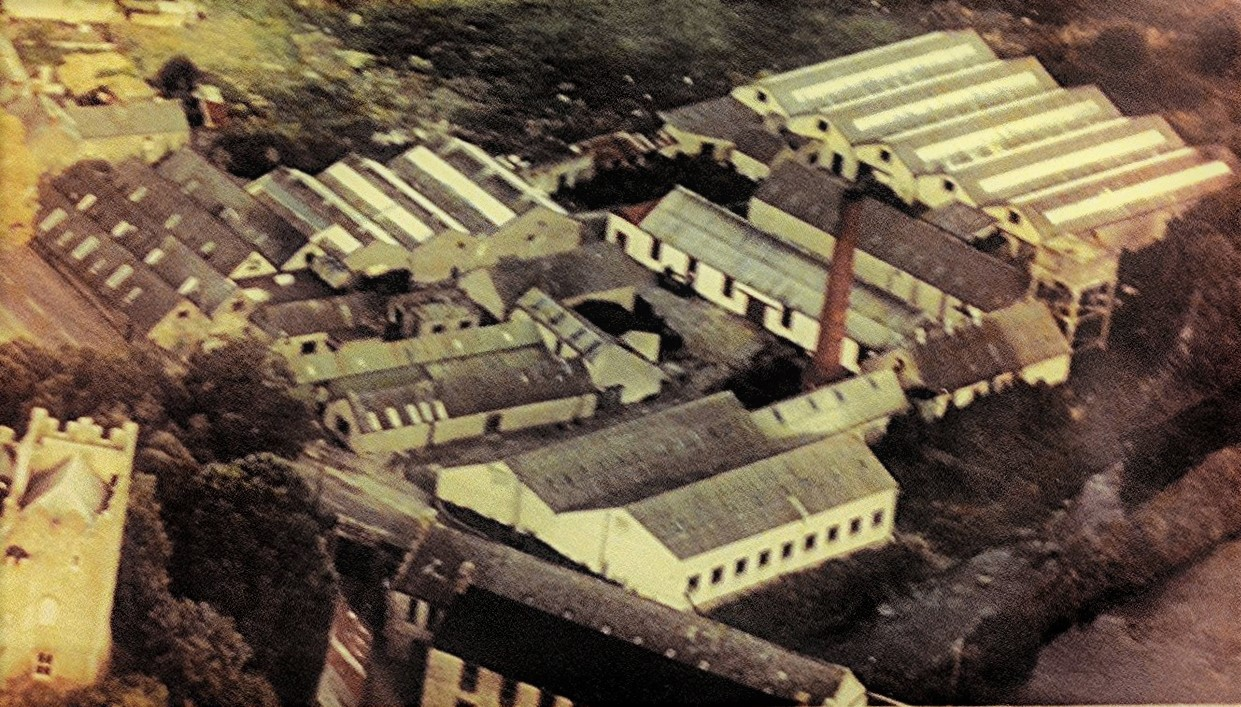
MR & Co. c.1970s

In the village today there are workers' cottages, an agricultural co-operative and Ardfinnan National School that were supported by the company and Ardfinnan GAA, founded in 1910 by members of the mill’s football team who had played on the green. Ardfinnan Woollen Workers Band formed in the 1890s as a brass band and there was a theatre and hall for céilí at the mills. The former Cycling and Athletics Club (1905), Handball Club and later tennis courts opened in 1926 were also introduced by the Mulcahy family. The mill's hydro-electrical generation and carbide lamps supplied electricity to local housing, businesses and street lighting from the 1900s until the ESB took over the supply in January 1953.
