= James Butler, 3rd Marquess of Ormonde =

British noble

The Most Honourable The Marquess of Ormonde KP PC
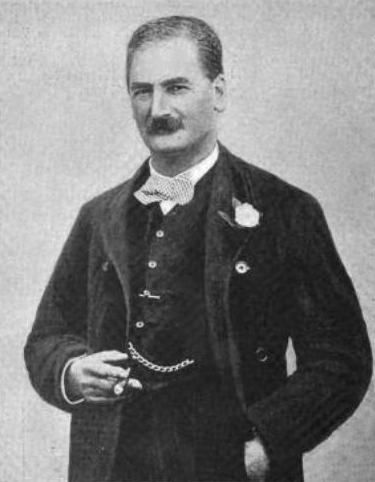
- In The Sketch, 20 February 1901

Lord-Lieutenant of County Kilkenny
- In office 1878–1919
- Monarch: Queen Victoria

Commodore of the Royal Yacht Squadron
- In office 1901–1919
- Monarch: Edward VII
- Preceded by: The Prince of Wales
- Succeeded by: George Osborne, 10th Duke of Leeds

Vice Commodore of the Royal Yacht Squadron
- In office 1885–1900
- Preceded by: George Vane-Tempest, 5th Marquess of Londonderry
- Succeeded by: George Osborne, 10th Duke of Leeds

Personal details
- Born: 5 October 1844 Kilkenny, Ireland
- Died: 26 October 1919 Kilkenny, Ireland
- Spouse: Lady Elizabeth Harriet Grosvenor (m. 1876)
- Children: Lady Beatrice Pole-Carew; Lady Constance Butler

James Edward William Theobald Butler, 3rd Marquess of Ormonde, KP, PC (Ire) (5 October 1844 – 26 October 1919), styled Earl of Ossory until 1854, was a Conservative Peer, Irish landowner, Yachtsman and member of the Butler dynasty.

== Early life ==
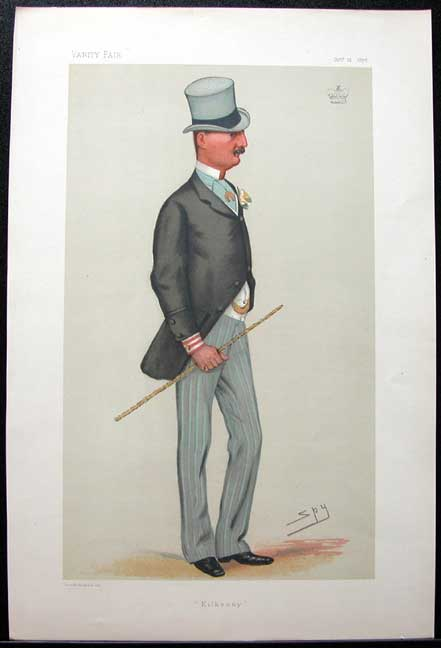
Caricature by Spy in Vanity Fair 1878

James Butler was born at Kilkenny Castle on 5 October 1844, the son of John Butler, 2nd Marquess of Ormonde and Frances Jane Paget. Through his mother he was a grandson of General The Hon. Sir Edward Paget and a great-grandson of Henry Paget, 1st Earl of Uxbridge and George Legge, 3rd Earl of Dartmouth.

From his birth until the death of his father in 1854, he was styled as Earl of Ossory, one of his father's subsidiary titles. He was a godson of Queen Adelaide, in whose household his mother served as a Lady-in-Waiting.

=== Marriage and Family ===
On 2 February 1876, he married Lady Elizabeth Harriet Grosvenor, daughter of Hugh Grosvenor, 1st Duke of Westminster, widely regarded to be the richest peer in England in the second half of the 19th century. The Duke settled £15,000 on Lady Elizabeth upon her marriage, which was increased to £35,000 in 1899 under the terms of his Will.

They had two daughters:

- Lady Beatrice Butler (1876–1952), married with Lt.-Gen. Sir Reginald Pole-Carew, KCB CVO, had issue.
- Lady Constance Mary Butler (1879–1949), died unmarried.

As Lord and Lady Ormonde's marriage produced no sons, Lord Ormonde's heir was the eldest of his surviving younger brothers Lord Arthur Butler. Despite this, Ormonde's daughters Lady Beatrice and Lady Constance were well-provided for financially, having been made the residuary legatees of the estate of their first-cousin twice-removed George O'Callaghan, 2nd Viscount Lismore - Lord Lismore's mother was a younger sister of John Butler, 17th Earl of Ormonde. Lismore had reportedly declared his intention to name Lord Ormonde's brother Lord Arthur Butler as his heir, causing some surprise amongst the family when his Will received that Lady Beatrice and Lady Constance were to inherit his estate.

Following the death of Lord Lismore in 1898 and his widow in 1900, Lady Beatrice and Lady Constance inherited approximately 47,000 acres in Ireland with an annual rent-roll of £18,435, centred on Shanbally Castle in County Tipperary, Ireland.

== Estates ==
=== Ireland ===
The third was the last Marquess of Ormonde to live at Kilkenny Castle, and lived in a style and on a scale which was typical of a wealthy British Peer. He and his wife hosted visits from the future King and Queen Prince George, Duke of York and The Duchess of York in 1899, as well as King Edward VII and Queen Alexandra at the castle in 1904.

The 1901 Census of Ireland records that the Ormondes' kept a large household at Kilkenny Castle, which included a butler, housekeeper, Cook, three ladies maids, a lodge keeper, two footmen, one "odd man", three housemaids, two dairy maids, one still room maid, one scullery maid, one kitchen maid, a hospital nurse and a professional nurse.

The 1911 census of Ireland records that seventeen servants resided at Kilkenny Castle as part of Lord and Lady Ormonde's household, including a Valet, two Footmen, a Chauffeur, Assistant Lodge Keeper, Housekeeper, Cook, Lady's Maid, four Housemaids, a still room maid, scullery maid, kitchen maid, and two dairy maids. Additional servants were housed in adjacent properties at No's 8 - 11 The Parade, Kilkenny, including a Butler, Groom, Land Agent, Laundress and two Laundry maids.

==== Sale of Irish Landholdings ====
Although the paper value of the income from the Ormonde Irish Estates was approximately £44,000 in the 1880s and 1890s, regular rental arrears arising from Ireland agricultural depression rendered the actual income as closer to £22,000 annually during the later decades of the nineteenth century; records survive of Lady Ormonde startling a guest seated next to her at Castle Ball by commenting that "we are very poor." The Ormonde landed Estates, which had spanned some 27,800 acres in the counties of Tipperary and Kilkenny in the 1880s, were sold in 1903 for £240,000 under the Wyndham Land Act. The family's Irish landholdings was thereafter reduced to the 95-acre demesne of Kilkenny Castle, approximately 700 acres at the Dunmore home farm, and some 3,500 acres of mountain forest (largely used for shooting and forestry) at the family's hunting Lodge at Ballyknockane, Tipperary.

=== England ===
==== London ====
The Ormonde's also maintained a London Townhouse in Mayfair; following their marriage they leased No. 5 Upper Brook Street in Mayfair from Lady Ormonde's father from 1877 to 1880. In 1881 they took a lease of 32 Upper Brook St; this house would continue to be their London home 1881 to 1921 (Lady Ormonde continued to lease the property after Lord Ormonde's death in 1919).

==== Derbyshire and Kent ====
In the months prior to his death, Lord Ormonde sold his estates near Eaton in Derbyshire for £51,000. The estates comprised 1,315 acres, which had a rent roll valued at £1,984 annually.

==== Isle of Wright ====
Ormonde was a keen yachtsman who held a Board of Trade certificate and had belonged to the Royal Yacht Squadron since 1867. At the age of twenty-three he owned the 42-ton schooner Koh-i-Noor, and in 1868 he commissioned the 197-ton schooner Mirage from Inman's of Lymington, aboard which he voyaged as far north as Spitsbergen. In 1883 he abandoned sails for steam by acquiring a 190-ton screw schooner, also named Mirage. Lord and Lady Ormonde were prominent in high society yachting circles, through which they came to be on friendly terms with Kaiser Wilhelm II of Germany during the 1890s.

In December 1910 Lord Ormonde leased Solent Lodge, a seaside villa in Cowes on the Isle of Wright with six reception rooms and eighteen bedrooms. He later purchased the property from Sir John Whittaker Ellis in mid-1911. Ormonde's family had previously enjoyed some historic association with the area; his maternal grandfather General The Hon. Sir Edward Paget had served as Governor of Cowes Castle from 1818 - 1826. Solent Lodge became the site of the Ormonde's frequent entertainments of royalty, including a visit King The King and Queen in July 1914, and longer visits from the Kaiser's brother Prince Henry of Prussia during the Cowes Regatta week in 1913 and 1914. During the First World War Lord Ormonde lent Solent Lodge as a nursing home for wounded soldiers.

== Career ==
A Colonel in the Royal East Kent Mounted Rifles and Commodore of the Royal Yacht Squadron, he was Vice-Admiral of Leinster and a member of the Privy Council of Ireland. He was awarded the Order of the Crown of Prussia (first class). He was invested as a Knight, Order of St Patrick in 1888. He held the office of Lord-Lieutenant of County Kilkenny between 1878 and 1919.

Lord Ormonde visited South Africa in 1903. In addition to the Royal Yacht Squadron, he was a member of the Royal Irish Yacht Club, the Royal St. George Yacht Club and the Imperial German Yacht Club.

=== Attempt to Restore Dukedom ===
Records survive of a letter which Lord Ormonde wrote to the-then Prime Minister of the United Kingdom, Benjamin Disraeli, regarding the restoration of the Dukedom of Ormonde in October 1868. Ormonde claimed that in 1825 his grandfather James Butler, 19th Earl of Ormonde had been advised by Prime Minister Lord Liverpool to apply for the restoration of the Dukedom of Ormonde, with the caveat that he would first need to apply to be elevated from the rank of Earl to Marquess. An application was duly made, and James, 19th Earl of Ormond was granted the title Marquess of Ormonde in 1825. The 3rd Marquess believed that Lord Liverpool's loss of the Office of Prime Minister in 1827 frustrated this plan, and the 1st Marquess took no further action towards applying for the restoration of the Dukedom.

The 3rd Marquess of Ormonde also alleged in his letter to Prime Minister Disraeli that his father John Butler, 2nd Marquess of Ormonde had resolved not to pursue the restoration of the Dukedom of Ormonde unless another peer was also elevated to a Dukedom during his lifetime. This eventually occurred in August 1868 when James Hamilton, 2nd Marquess of Abercorn was made Duke of Abercorn, which was the trigger for Ormonde's request to Disraeli.

Disraeli responded to the 3rd Marquess' letter on 27 October 1868, and expressed his sympathy with Lord Ormonde's desire to restore "the title of an illustrious ancestor". However, in his letter Disraeli implied that the political climate of the time did not render the creation, or restoration, of the Dukedom of Ormonde to be appropriate, noting that "the condition of the party [the Conservative Party] is now critical."

=== Royal links ===
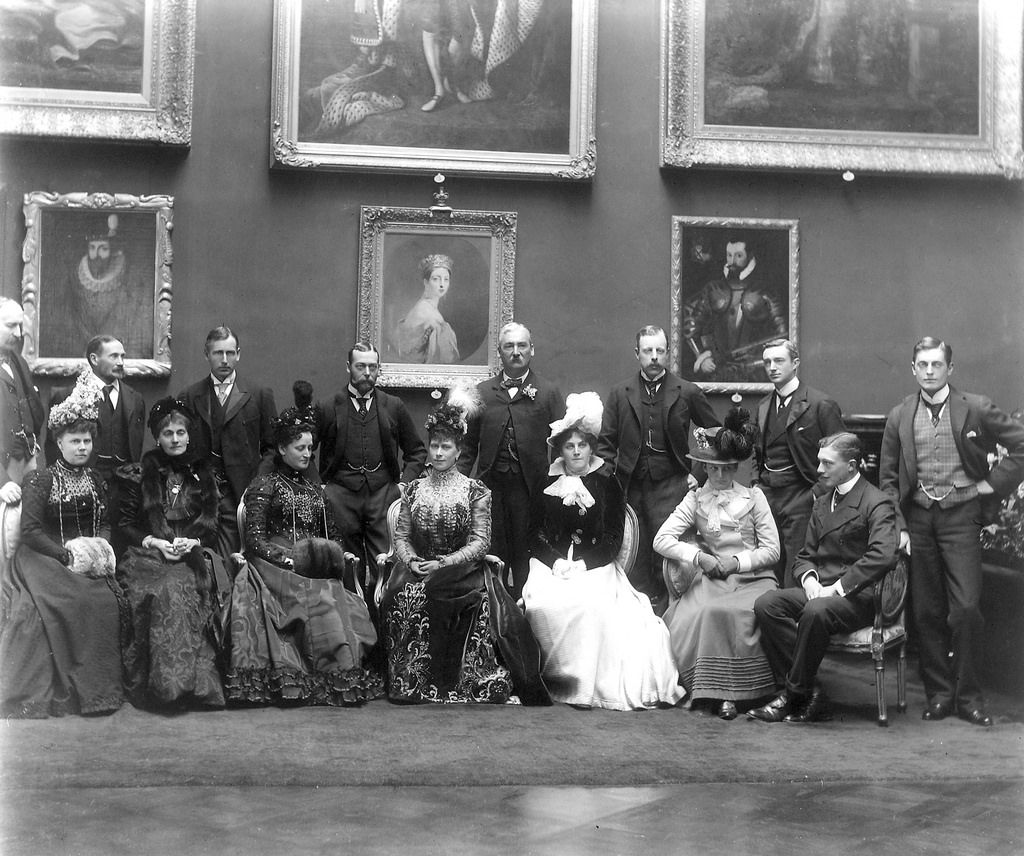
The Duke and Duchess of York, Kilkenny Castle, 1899

Lord and Lady Ormonde maintained close links with the British Royal Family.

Lord Ormonde's mother Frances had served as a lady-in-waiting to the widowed Queen Adelaide from 1844 to 1849, and Queen Adelaide stood as one of his godmothers. His father John Butler, 2nd Marquess of Ormonde had also served as a Lord-in-Waiting to Queen Victoria from 1841 to 1852, and 1853-54. Lord Ormonde's maternal grandfather General The Hon. Sir Edward Paget served as an Aide-de-camp to King George III in 1798, as a Groom of the Bedchamber to George IV from 1816 to 1822.

His sisters Lady Mary Butler and Lady Blanche Butler were both selected to be bridesmaids at weddings of The Queen's children; Lady Mary in 1871 at the wedding of Princess Louise to John Campbell, Marquess of Lorne, and later Lady Blanche in 1882 at the Wedding of Prince Leopold, Duke of Albany to Princess Helen of Waldeck and Pyrmont. Lady Mary also served as a Lady of the Bedchamber in the Household of the Queen's daughter-in-law, The Duchess of Edinburgh from 1874, and as Extra Lady-in-Waiting from 1877.

On his wife's side, Lady Ormonde's maternal grandmother Harriet, Duchess of Sutherland was a favourite of Queen Victoria, serving as Mistress of the Robes on four occasions spanning fifteen years between 1837 and 1861. In 1894 her sister Lady Margaret Grosvenor married Prince Adolphus of Teck, brother of Queen Mary.

The close relationship between the Royal Family and the Ormondes was well-documented in the days prior to the wedding of their elder daughter Lady Beatrice Butler. Two days prior to the Wedding Ceremony (the reception was held at Stafford House) King Edward and Queen Alexandra received Lord and Lady Ormonde, Lady Beatrice, and Beatrice's fiancée Major-General Sir Reginald Pole-Carew at Marlborough House, where the King and Queen presented Beatrice with a wedding present of a pair of diamonds wings with a large ruby in the centre. The King also personally presented an Indian Shawl directly to Lady Beatrice. King Edward VII's daughter Princess Victoria also gave Beatrice a wedding present of a blue enamel and diamond brooch. The King's sisters Princess Louise, Duchess of Argyll, Princess Christian of Schleswig-Holstein and Princess Henry of Battenberg gave respective wedding presents of a diamond and emerald bracelet, an antique silver and tortoiseshell casket and a gold curb bracelet. The Duke of Cornwall and York and Duchess of Cornwall and York gave the couple a diamond and enammelled pendant, and the King's brother the Duke of Connaught gave a buhl clock.

In 1952 Queen Camilla (then Miss Camilla Shand) and her sister Annabel Shand served as child bridesmaids at the wedding of their uncle The Hon. Jeremy Cubitt to Lord Ormonde's great-granddaughter Diana Du Cane.

== Succession ==
Lord Ormonde died at Kilkenny Castle on 26 October 1919. Upon his death, the family titles passed to his brother Lord Arthur Butler due to his lack of a male heir.

Prior to Ormonde's death, his brother Lord Arthur requested that he older alter his will in favor of Lord Arthur's sons. Records survive of a letter written by Lord Ormonde to his nephew Capt. George Butler dated 27 June 1916 outlining changes to his will which "your father has asked me to alter." These changes postponed Lord Arthur's entitlement to the use of and income from property held in the Ormonde Settled Estates Trust in favor of George, George's sons (at the time George's wife Sybil was pregnant with their only son, Anthony Butler) and George's brother Arthur and his male issue. The purpose of the letter was to inform George of the changes Ormonde had made to his Will to effect this, and request that George not undertake any changes to the family's Irish homes, Kilkenny Castle and Ballyknockane Lodge, and that George ensure that his own mother would have use of the family jewels during the lifetime of Lord Arthur.

Under the terms of their marriage settlement, Ormonde's widow Elizabeth, Dowager Marchioness of Ormonde received a life annuity of £3,000 from the Ormonde Estates. Furthermore, in his will Ormonde provided for additional annuities of £3,000 to Lord Arthur for life, and £275 for his youngest surviving brother Lord Theobald Butler, which would also be payable to Lord Theobald's wife during her lifetime if she outlived her husband. Lady Ormonde also inherited their Villa, Solent Lodge on the Isle of Wright, which became her primary residence during her widowhood. Lord Ormonde's total estate (including entailed property) was valued at approximately £450,000.

Honorary titles
Preceded by William Tighe	Lord Lieutenant of Kilkenny; 1878–1919	Succeeded by The Earl of Desart
Peerage of Ireland
Preceded by John Butler	Marquess of Ormonde; 1854–1919	Succeeded by Lord Arthur Butler
