= Lady Beatrice Frances Elizabeth Pole-Carew =

British aristocrat (1876–1952)

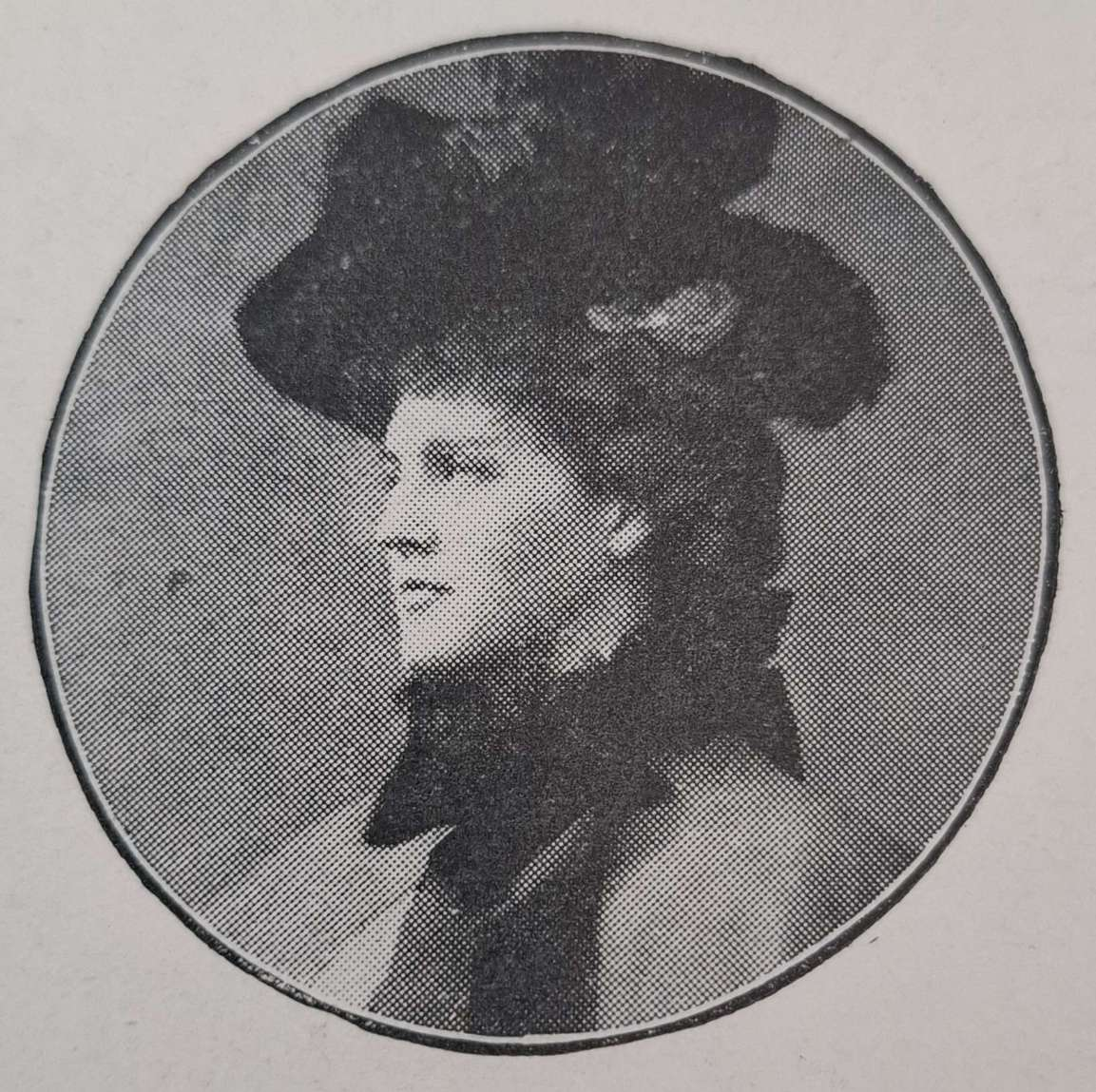
- Photo of Lady Beatrice Frances Elizabeth Pole-Carew, as seen in the Black and White Budget, 5 January 1901
- Born: December 28, 1876
- Died: February 29, 1952
- Spouse: Sir Reginald Pole-Carew
- Parents: James Butler, 3rd Marquess of Ormonde (father); Elizabeth Butler, Marchioness of Ormonde (mother)

Lady Beatrice Frances Elizabeth Pole-Carew (née Butler) was a British aristocrat. She was a daughter of James Butler, 3rd Marquess of Ormonde and Elizabeth Butler, Marchioness of Ormonde, and the wife of Lieutenant-General Sir Reginald Pole-Carew. She is recorded as a sitter in several national portrait and heritage collections.

== Early life and family ==
Lady Beatrice Frances Elizabeth Butler was born on 28 December 1876. She was the eldest daughter of James Butler, 3rd Marquess of Ormonde and Elizabeth Butler, Marchioness of Ormonde, daughter of Hugh Grosvenor, 1st Duke of Westminster.

Through her parents, she was connected to the Butler dynasty, a historic Anglo-Norman noble house long prominent in Ireland, and the Grosvenor family, which accumulated extensive land and property holdings in Britain, particularly in London's Mayfair and Belgravia districts.

== Marriage and family ==
On 19 February 1901, Lady Beatrice married Sir Reginald Pole-Carew, a British Army officer who later attained the rank of lieutenant-general, in the Guards Chapel, Knightsbridge. The wedding reception was held at Stafford House.

Sir Reginald and Lady Beatrice had four children:

- Sir John Carew Pole, 12th Baronet (1902 - 1993) married Cynthia Burns, great-niece of J. P. Morgan in 1928
  - Elizabeth Mary Carew Pole (1929 - 2021) married David Quilter, grandson of Sir Cuthbert Quilter, 1st Baronet
  - Caroline Anne Carew Pole (1933 - 2018) married The Hon. Paul Asquith, son of Cyril Asquith, Baron Asquith of Bishopstone
  - Sir Richard Carew Pole, 13th Baronet (1938 - 2024) married Mary Dawnay (later Dame Mary Carew Pole)
- Marye Frances Pole-Carew (1903 - 1987)
- Victoria Geraldine Pole-Carew (1904 - 1987) married Peter Du Cane in 1929.
  - Diana Edith Du Cane (1929 - 2021) married The Hon. Jeremy Cubitt, son of Roland Cubitt, 3rd Baron Ashcombe and uncle of Queen Camilla (who was a bridesmaid at their wedding) in 1952, divorced 1957.
  - Margaret Anne Du Cane (1932 - 2023) married David Stuart, 2nd Viscount Stuart of Findhorn in 1979.
  - Charles Antony Du Cane (b. 1940)
- Patrick William Butler Pole-Carew (1913 - 1971) married Sonia Quilter, daughter of Sir Cuthbert Quilter, 2nd Baronet in 1939, divorced in 1950.
  - Rosemary Pole-Carew (b. 1940)

== Later life and death ==
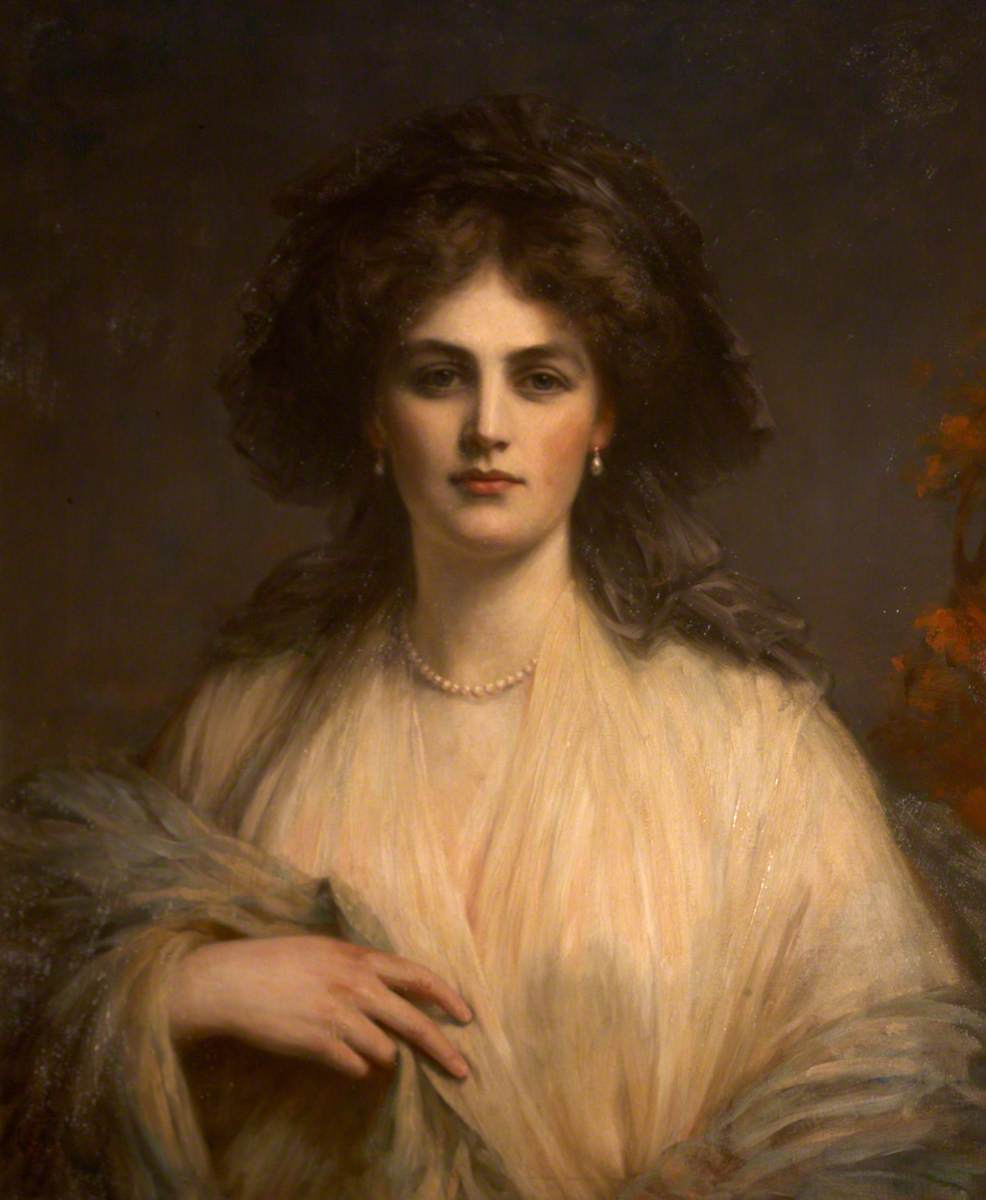
Portrait of Lady Beatrice Pole-Carew, by Ellis William Roberts (1860–1930).

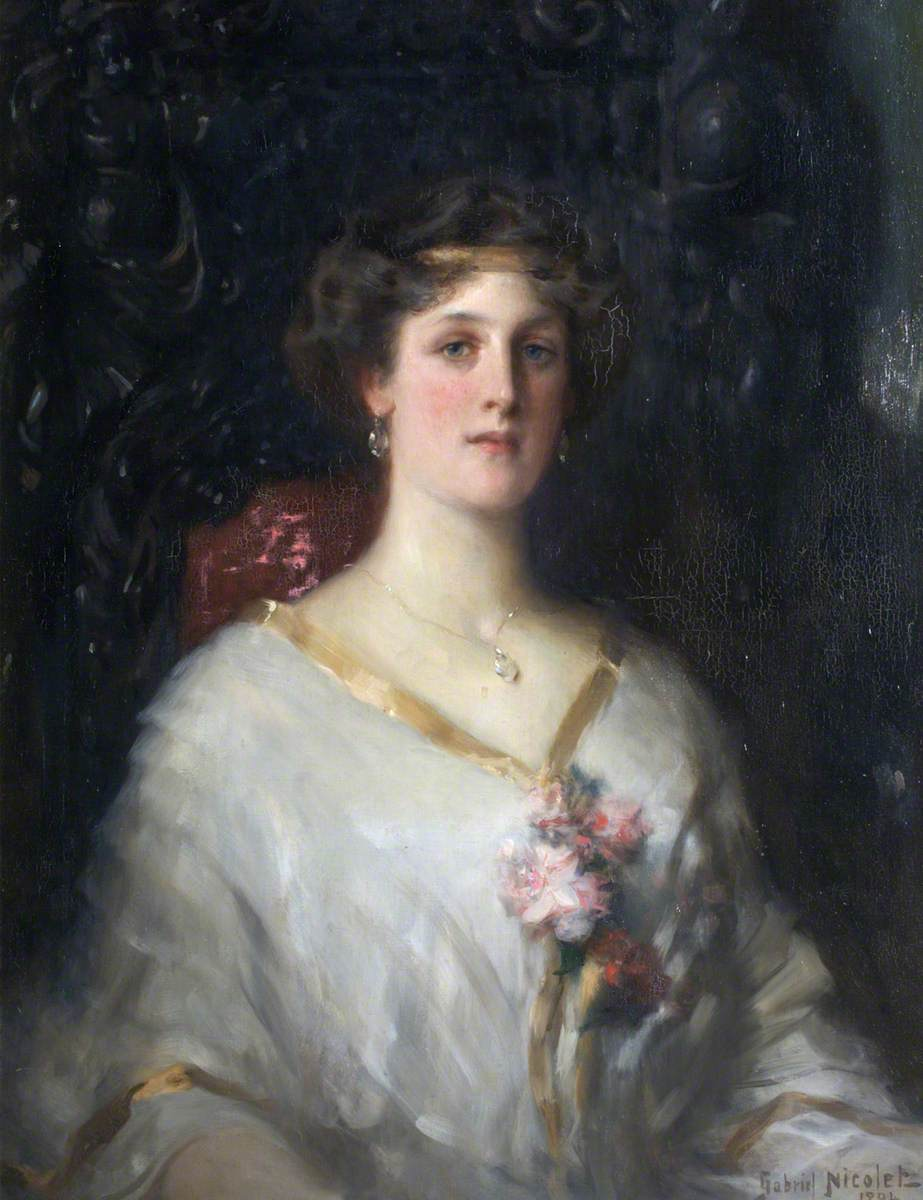
Portrait of Lady Beatrice Frances Elizabeth Pole-Carew by Gabriel Émile Edouard Nicolet (1856–1921).

By the time Lady Beatrice Butler married Sir Reginald in 1901, she had become a wealthy heiress in her own right. Although she was the eldest of the Marquess of Ormonde's two daughters, as well as a maternal granddaughter of the richest peer in the United Kingdom Hugh Grosvenor, 1st Duke of Westminster, Beatrice and her sister Lady Constance Butler had become heiresses primarily due to an unexpected inheritance from a distant cousin.

In 1898, the will of their first-cousin twice-removed George O'Callaghan, 2nd Viscount Lismore revealed that Beatrice and Constance would inherit his estate, subject to a life interest held by his widow. Following the death of the Dowager Lady Lismore in 1900, Lady Beatrice and Lady Constance inherited an estate worth an estimated £25,000 annually, as well as Shanbally Castle in County Tipperary, Ireland, which contemporary news reports suggested was worth £25,000 annually. However, other sources indicated that upon his death, the 2nd Viscount Lismore owned 47,442 statutory acres which had an annual rent-roll of £18,435.

During the early 20th century much of the landed estates which Lady Beatrice and her sister had inherited from Lord Lismore were sold via the Irish Land Commission:

- In 1907 they were paid an advance of £15,200 for the sale of 1,104 acres in Tippery and 22 acres in Derry.
- In March 1910 a further £38,814 was paid as an advance to the sisters from the Land Commission for the sale of 2,587 acres in Tipperary, and £1,922 for 175 acres in King's County
- On 1 January 1912 a further 5,361 acres in Tipperary were sold for £13,129.

Lady Beatrice died on 29 February 1952 at the age of 75.

== Portraits and legacy ==
Lady Beatrice Pole-Carew is recorded as a sitter in works held by the National Portrait Gallery and in objects held by the National Trust.
