= Lady Constance Butler =

Anglo-Irish noblewoman, yachtswoman and antiquarian

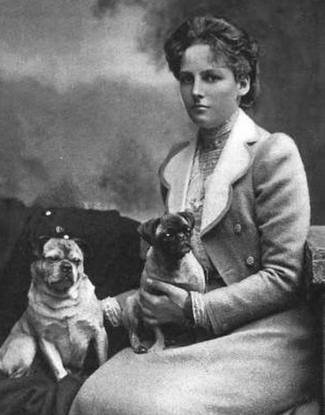
Lady Constance Butler with her two pugs, from the cover of a 1903 publication.

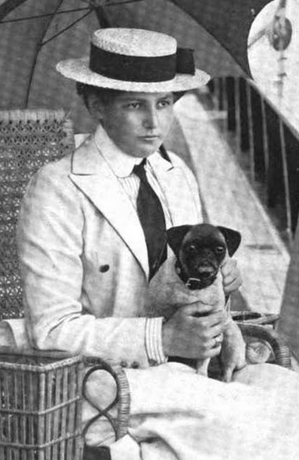
Lady Constance Butler with one of her pugs, aboard the S. Y. Miranda, from a 1907 publication.

Lady Constance Mary Butler (26 March 1879 – 20 April 1949) was an Anglo-Irish noblewoman, yachtswoman and antiquarian. Medical volunteer work during World War I led to a later career in radiography.

== Early life and family ==
Constance Mary Butler was the daughter of James Butler, 3rd Marquess of Ormonde and Lady Elizabeth Grosvenor. Her grandfathers were John Butler, 2nd Marquess of Ormonde and Hugh Grosvenor, 1st Duke of Westminster. Her great-grandfather, George Sutherland-Leveson-Gower, 2nd Duke of Sutherland, was a member of the Leveson-Gower family. Another great-grandfather, Edward Paget, was the British Governor of Ceylon. Constance's older sister Beatrice married Sir Reginald Pole-Carew, an officer in the British Army.

== Career ==
Both of her parents were active in yachting, and Lady Constance was recognized as a "keen yachtswoman" and a "wonderful swimmer." "Lady Ormonde and her daughter always wear, when yachting, the most severely simple and workmanlike clothes." She was also considered a beauty among the noblewomen of her generation, and what she wore (on dressier occasions than yachting) was reported in detail on society pages.

She and her sister attended the coronation of King George V and Queen Mary in 1911, seated in a box set aside for "personal friends of the Queen and Queen Alexandra." During World War I she managed a Red Cross depot for medical and surgical supplies, and collaborated with Bishop John Henry Bernard on translating, editing, and publishing the Charters of Duiske Abbey.

Later in life, Lady Constance Butler remained interested in medical work, and became an expert on radiography, heading the x-ray department at St. Andrew's Hospital in London by 1924.

== Personal life ==
As Lady Constance had no brothers, her father's heir was the eldest of his surviving younger brothers Lord Arthur Butler. Despite this, she and her sister Beatrice were well-provided for financially, having been made the residuary legatees of the estate of their first-cousin twice-removed George O'Callaghan, 2nd Viscount Lismore - Lord Lismore's mother was a younger sister of Constance's great-grandfather James Butler, 1st Marquess of Ormonde.

== Estates and inheritance ==
Following the death of Viscount Lismore in 1898 and his widow in 1900, Lady Constance and her sister Lady Beatrice inherited an estate centred on Shanbally Castle in Tipperary, Ireland, which contemporary news reports suggested was worth £25,000 annually. However, other sources indicated that upon his death, the 2nd Viscount Lismore owned 47,442 statutory acres which had an annual rent-roll of £18,435.

During the early 20th century much of the landed estates which Lady Constance and her sister had inherited from Lord Lismore were sold via the Irish Land Commission:

- In 1907 they were paid an advance of £15,200 for the sale of 1,104 acres in Tippery and 22 acres in Derry.
- In March 1910 a further £38,814 was paid as an advance to the sisters from the Land Commission for the sale of 2,587 acres in Tipperary, and £1,922 for 175 acres in King's County
- On 1 January 1912 a further 5,361 acres in Tipperary were sold for £13,129.
