= Reginald Pole-Carew (British Army officer) =

British Army officer (1849–1924)

Lieutenant-General Sir Reginald Pole-Carew KCB CVO
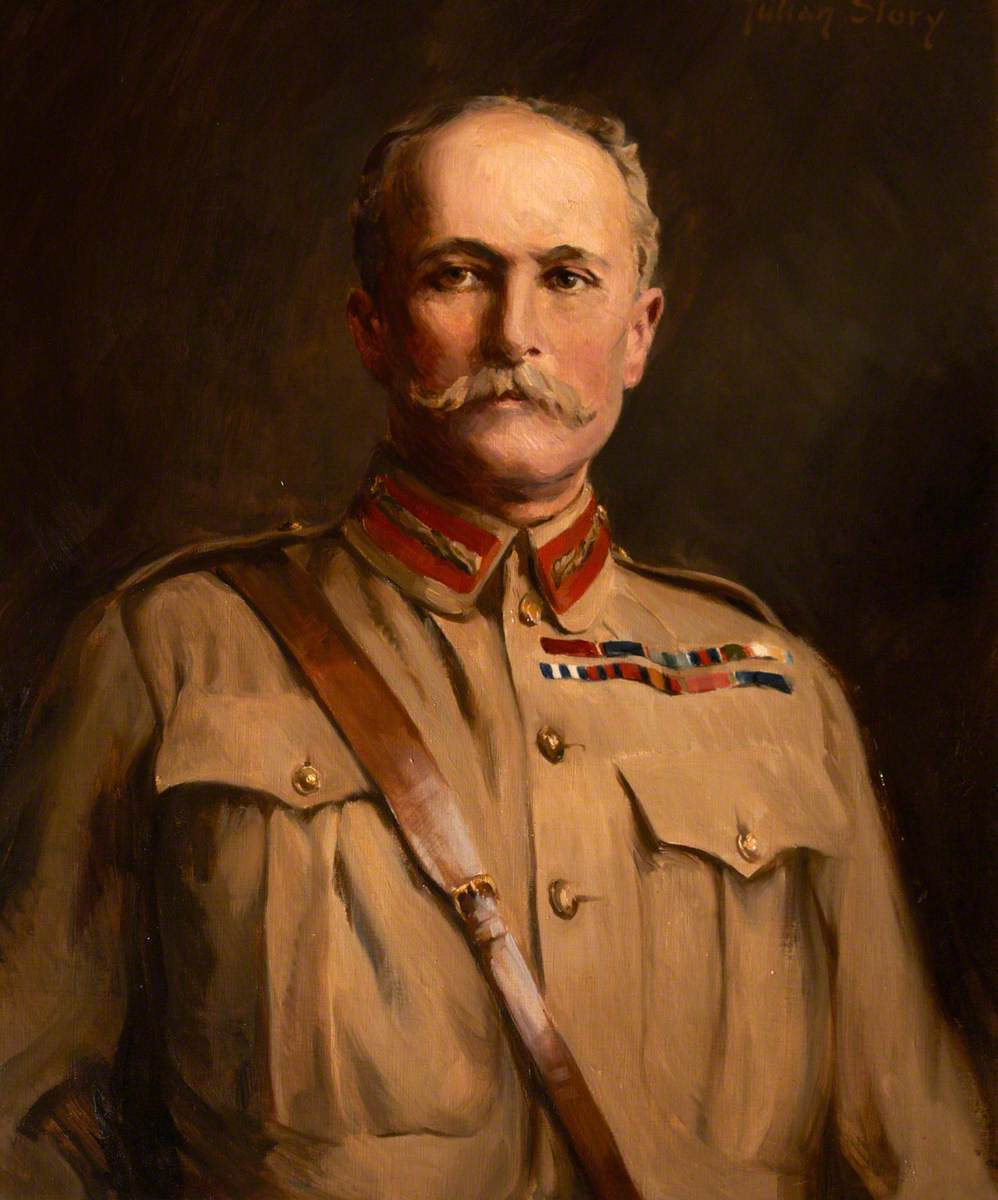
- Portrait by Julian Russell Story
- Born: 1 May 1849
- Died: 19 September 1924 (aged 75)
- Military career
- Allegiance: United Kingdom
- Branch: British Army
- Rank: Lieutenant-General
- Commands: 8th Division; 11th Division; Guards Brigade; 9th Brigade
- Conflicts: Second Anglo-Afghan War; Second Boer War
- Awards: Knight Commander of the Order of the Bath; Commander of the Royal Victorian Order

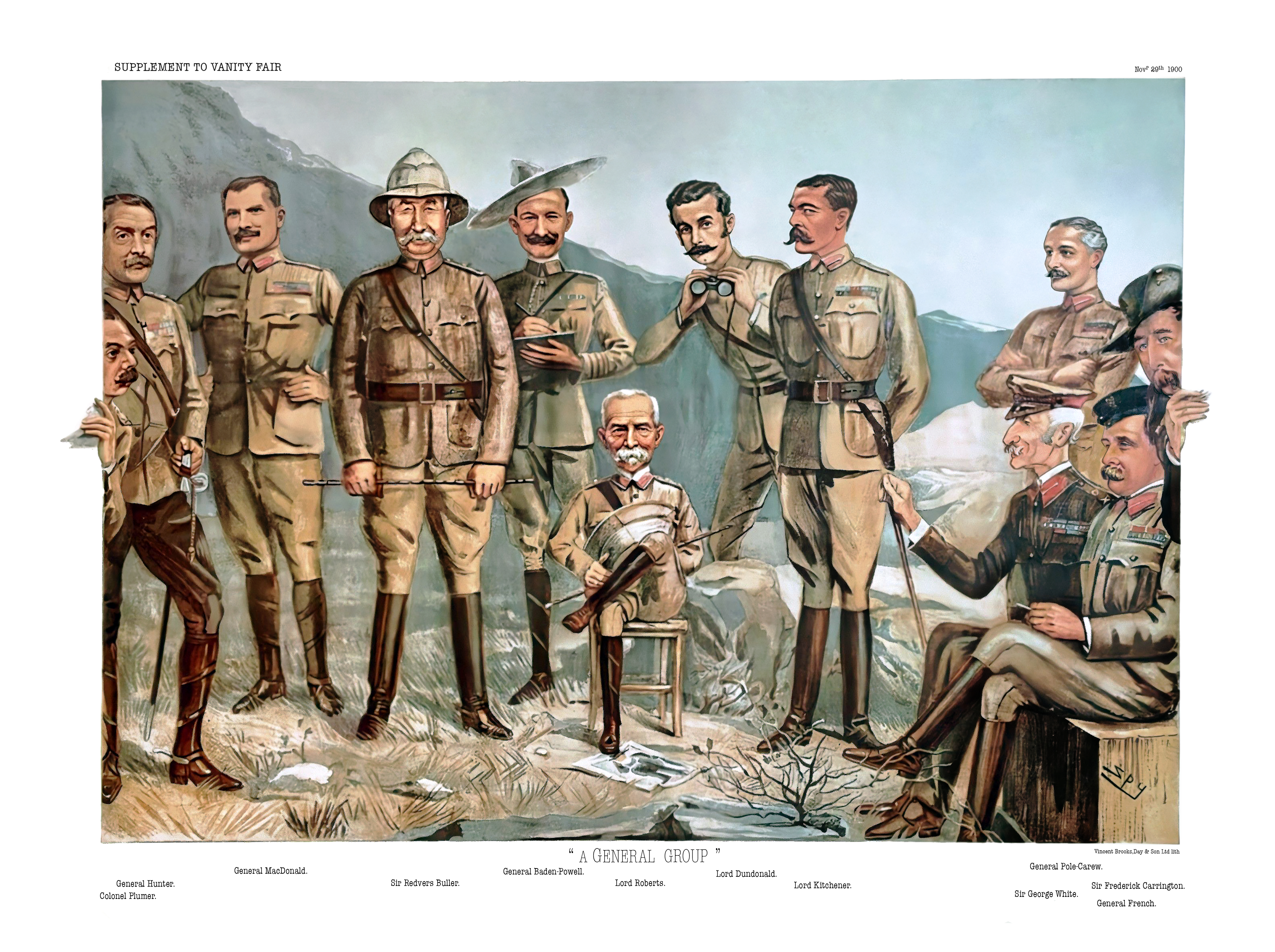
"A General Group", Vanity Fair, 29 November 1900, depicting Lord Roberts and his commanders. Standing l-r: Plumer, Hunter, Macdonald, Buller, Baden-Powell, Dundonald, Kitchener, Pole-Carew and Carrington. Seated at right: White and French. Roberts' foot rests on the 8 March print of Kruger

Lieutenant-General Sir Reginald Pole-Carew (1 May 1849 – 19 September 1924) was a British politician, landowner and British Army officer who became General Officer Commanding 8th Division.

== Background and family ==
Pole-Carew was the son of William Pole-Carew (1811–1888) by his wife Frances Anne Buller (d. 1902), daughter of John Buller. His father was a descendant of the Pole baronets of Shute House, and served as Member of Parliament for East Cornwall.

== Military career ==
Pole-Carew was commissioned into the Coldstream Guards in 1869. He was promoted to lieutenant colonel in February 1895.

He served as a staff officer with Lord Roberts in the Second Anglo-Afghan War in 1878 and again served with him during the Second Boer War of 1899–1902. He was promoted to the substantive rank of colonel on 27 November 1899, and at the same time appointed in command of the 9th Brigade with the local rank of major-general. As such he was in command of the brigade during the Battle of Modder River on 28 November 1899. In February 1900 he was appointed in command of the Guards Brigade, shortly before the Relief of Kimberley, but two months later he transferred in april 1900 to command of the 11th Division of the South Africa Field Force.

After the end of the war in South Africa, he was appointed General Officer Commanding 8th Division in Southern Ireland in 1903. The date of this appointment was later antedated to 1 November 1903.

== Political career ==
Pole-Carew was Liberal Unionist Member of Parliament for Bodmin from 1910 to 1916. In 1911, he was appointed a deputy lieutenant of Cornwall. He lived at Antony House in Cornwall.

General Pole-Carew, his wife Beatrice and his sister-in-law Lady Constance Butler hosted the King, the Queen, and Princess Victoria at Shanbally Castle on 3 May 1904.

== Marriage and children ==
On 19 February 1901, Pole-Carew married Lady Beatrice Frances Elizabeth Butler, daughter of James Butler, 3rd Marquess of Ormonde and Elizabeth Butler, Marchioness of Ormonde, in the Guards Chapel, Knightsbridge. The wedding reception was held at Stafford House, which was then the London residence of Cromartie Sutherland-Leveson-Gower, 4th Duke of Sutherland, who was a first cousin of Lady Beatrice's mother Lady Ormonde.

Two days prior to the Wedding Ceremony King Edward and Queen Alexandra had received Lord and Lady Ormonde, Lady Beatrice, and Major General Pole-Carew at Marlborough House, where the King and Queen presented Beatrice with a wedding present of a pair of diamonds wings with a large ruby in the centre. The King also personally presented an Indian Shawl directly to Lady Beatrice. King Edward VII's daughter Princess Victoria also gave Beatrice a wedding present of a blue enamel and diamond brooch. The King's sisters Princess Louise, Duchess of Argyll, Princess Christian of Schleswig-Holstein and Princess Henry of Battenberg gave respective wedding presents of a diamond and emerald bracelet, an antique silver and tortoiseshell casket and a gold curb bracelet. The Duke of Cornwall and York and Duchess of Cornwall and York gave the couple a diamond and enamelled pendant, and the King's brother the Duke of Connaught gave a buhl clock.

Sir Reginald and Lady Beatrice had four children:

- Sir John Carew Pole, 12th Baronet (1902 - 1993) married Cynthia Burns, great-niece of J. P. Morgan in 1928
  - Elizabeth Mary Carew Pole (1929 - 2021) married David Quilter, grandson of Sir Cuthbert Quilter, 1st Baronet
  - Caroline Anne Carew Pole (1933 - 2018) married The Hon. Paul Asquith, son of Cyril Asquith, Baron Asquith of Bishopstone
  - Sir Richard Carew Pole, 13th Baronet (1938 - 2024) married Mary Dawnay (later Dame Mary Carew Pole)
- Marye Frances Pole-Carew (1903 - 1987)
- Victoria Geraldine Pole-Carew (1904 - 1987) married Peter Du Cane in 1929.
  - Diana Edith Du Cane (1929 - 2021) married The Hon. Jeremy Cubitt, son of Roland Cubitt, 3rd Baron Ashcombe and uncle of Queen Camilla (who was a bridesmaid at their wedding) in 1952, divorced 1957.
  - Margaret Anne Du Cane (1932 - 2023) married David Stuart, 2nd Viscount Stuart of Findhorn in 1979.
  - Charles Antony Du Cane (b. 1940)
- Patrick William Butler Pole-Carew (1913 - 1971) married Sonia Quilter, daughter of Sir Cuthbert Quilter, 2nd Baronet in 1939, divorced in 1950.
  - Rosemary Pole-Carew (b. 1940)

=== Inheritance and estates ===
Reginald inherited the Antony House Estate in Cornwall in 1888 following the death of his father. The Return of Owners of Land, 1873 Survey recorded that the Carew-Pole Estates near Torpoint in Cornwall comprised 3,698 acres of land yielding an estimated annual income of £6,401.

By the time Reginald married Lady Beatrice Butler in 1901, she had become a wealthy heiress in her own right. Although she was the eldest of the Marquess of Ormonde's two daughters, as well as a maternal granddaughter of the richest peer in the United Kingdom Hugh Grosvenor, 1st Duke of Westminster, Beatrice and her sister Lady Constance Butler had become heiresses primarily due to an unexpected inheritance from their first-cousin-twice-removed George O'Callaghan, 2nd Viscount Lismore. Following Lord Lismore's death in 1898 his will revealed that Lady Beatrice and Lady Constance Butler would inherit his estate, subject to a life interest held by Lismore's widow, Mary, Dowager Viscountess Lismore.

Following the death of the Dowager Lady Lismore in 1900, Lady Beatrice and Lady Constance inherited a 45,000-acre estate in Ireland centred Shanbally Castle in County Tipperary; the net annual income which this estate produced in the early 20th century was approximately £18,500.

Following Sir Reginald's death in 1924, his eldest son John inherited the Antony House Estate in Cornwall, whilst his younger son Major Patrick Pole-Carew later inherited the Shanbally Castle estate. Following the deaths Lady Constance Butler in 1949 and later Lady Beatrice Pole-Carew in 1953, Patrick sold the Shanbally Estate to the Irish Land Commission during the 1950's.

== Decorations ==
- Companion of the Order of the Bath – 25 November 1887
- Knight Commander of the Order of the Bath – 29 November 1900, in recognition of services in connection with the Campaign in South Africa 1899–1900
- Commander of the Royal Victorian Order – 8 March 1901

Military offices
Preceded by Hugh McCalmont	General Officer Commanding the 8th Division; 1903–1905	Succeeded by William Knox
Parliament of the United Kingdom
Preceded by Cecil Grenfell	Member of Parliament for Bodmin; December 1910 – 1916	Succeeded by Charles Hanson
