= Elizabeth Butler, Marchioness of Ormonde =

British aristocrat (1856–1928)

Elizabeth, Marchioness of Ormonde
- Born: Elizabeth Harriet Grosvenor; 11 October 1856
- Died: 25 March 1928 (aged 71)
- Spouse: James Butler, 3rd Marquess of Ormonde (m. 1876)
- Children: Lady Beatrice Butler; Lady Constance Mary Butler
- Parents: Hugh Grosvenor, 1st Duke of Westminster (father); Lady Constance Gertrude Sutherland-Leveson-Gower (mother)

Elizabeth Butler, Marchioness of Ormonde (née Lady Elizabeth Harriet Grosvenor; 11 October 1856 – 25 March 1928), was a British aristocrat who was the eldest daughter of Hugh Grosvenor, 1st Duke of Westminster and Lady Constance Gertrude Sutherland-Leveson-Gower (daughter of George Sutherland-Leveson-Gower, 2nd Duke of Sutherland). In 1876 she married James Butler, 3rd Marquess of Ormonde and became the Marchioness of Ormonde until her husband's death in 1919. She was the last Marchioness of Ormonde to live at the Butler Family's ancestral seat Kilkenny Castle.

She was regarded as a great society beauty during her youth, and was descended in the matrilineal line from a number of celebrated female aristocrats; Elizabeth was a granddaughter of Harriet, Duchess of Sutherland, and a great-great granddaughter of Georgiana, Duchess of Devonshire.

== Marriage ==
Reportedly a great society beauty during her youth, Lady Elizabeth became engaged to the Marquess of Ormonde in 1875, and the pair were married at Aldford Church, Chester, on 2 February 1876. They had two daughters:

- Lady Beatrice Butler (1876–1952), married with Lt.-Gen. Sir Reginald Pole-Carew, KCB CVO, had issue.
- Lady Constance Mary Butler (1879–1949), died unmarried.

=== Marriage settlement ===
The Duke of Westminster provided Elizabeth with a £15,000 marriage settlement, which was later increased to £35,000 in 1899 under the terms of the Duke's Will. The marriage settlement also provided Elizabeth with a jointure of £3,000 annually from the Ormonde Estates if she outlived her husband, as well as a charge on the estates for a lump sum of £15,000 for the provision of any children of the marriage other than the first-born son.

== Marchioness of Ormonde ==
Lord and Lady Ormonde resided at the family seat Kilkenny Castle for the duration of their marriage. They entertained King Edward VII and Queen Alexandra at the castle in 1904. Lord Ormonde had succeeded The King as Commodore of the Royal Yacht Squadron upon the former's ascension to the Throne in 1901. Other royal visitors Elizabeth hosted at Kilkenny Castle included The Duke and Duchess of York (the future King George V and Queen Mary in April 1899, and Prince Arthur, Duke of Connaught and Strathearn in early 1877.

Lord and Lady Ormonde leased 32 Upper Brook St in London as their London home from the Duke of Westminster from 1881 to 1921 (Lady Ormonde continued to lease the property after Lord Ormonde's death in 1919). It was later reported that the property was gifted to Elizabeth by her father.

The 1901 Census of Ireland records that the Ormondes' Household at Kilkenny included a Butler, Housekeeper, Cook, three Ladies Maids, a Lodge Keeper, two Footmen, one "Odd Man", three Housemaids, two Dairy Maids, one Still Room Maid, one Scullery Maid, one Kitchen Maid, a Hospital Nurse and a Professional Nurse. The 1911 census of Ireland records that seventeen servants resided at Kilkenny Castle as part of Lord and Lady Ormonde's household, including a Valet, two Footmen, a Chauffeur, Assistant Lodge Keeper, Housekeeper, Cook, Lady's Maid, four Housemaids, a still room maid, scullery maid, kitchen maid, and two dairy maids. Additional servants were housed in adjacent properties at No's 8 - 11 The Parade, Kilkenny, including a Butler, Groom, Land Agent, Laundress and two Laundry maids.

During the First World War, Elizabeth served as the President of the Kilkenny County Branches of the British Red Cross Society and Soldiers' and Sailors' Families' Association.

=== Royal links ===
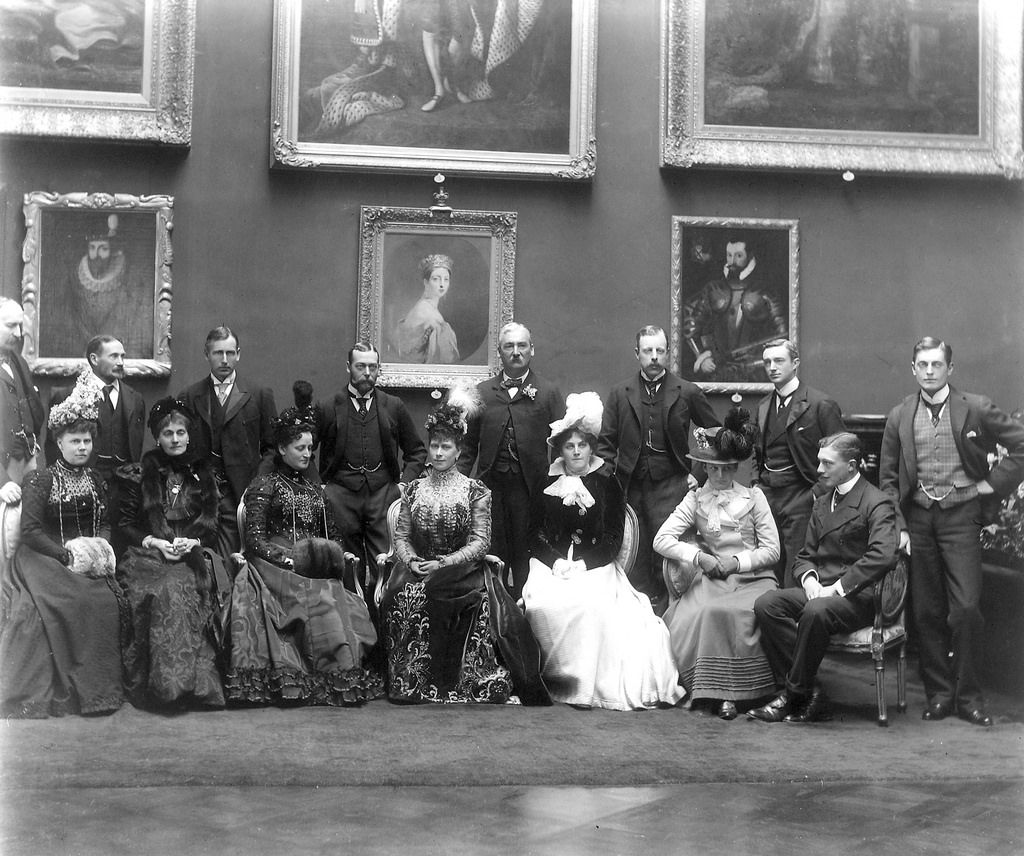
The Duke and Duchess of York, Kilkenny Castle, 1899

Lord and Lady Ormonde maintained close links with the British Royal Family. Elizabeth's maternal grandmother Harriet, Duchess of Sutherland was a favourite of Queen Victoria, serving as Mistress of the Robes on four occasions spanning fifteen years between 1837 and 1861. In 1894 Elizabeth's sister Lady Margaret Grosvenor married Prince Adolphus of Teck, brother of Queen Mary.

On her husband's side of the family, Elizabeth's mother-in-law Frances, Marchioness of Ormonde had served as a lady-in-waiting to the widowed Queen Adelaide from 1844 to 1849; Queen Adelaide was also a godmother of the Third Marquess of Ormonde. Elizabeth's late father-in-law John Butler, 2nd Marquess of Ormonde had also served as a Lord-in-Waiting to Queen Victoria from 1841-1852, and 1853-54. Lord Ormonde's maternal grandfather General The Hon. Sir Edward Paget had also served as an Aide-de-camp to King George III in 1798, as a Groom of the Bedchamber to George IV from 1816 to 1822.

Elizabeth's sisters-in-law Lady Mary Butler and Lady Blanche Butler were both selected to be bridesmaids at weddings of The Queen's children; Lady Mary in 1871 at the wedding of Princess Louise to John Campbell, Marquess of Lorne, and later Lady Blanche in 1882 at the Wedding of Prince Leopold, Duke of Albany to Princess Helen of Waldeck and Pyrmont. Lady Mary also served as a Lady of the Bedchamber in the Household of the Queen's daughter-in-law, The Duchess of Edinburgh from 1874, and as Extra Lady-in-Waiting from 1877.

The close relationship between the Royal Family and Elizabeth's family was well-documented in the days prior to the wedding of their elder daughter Lady Beatrice Butler. Two days prior to the Wedding Ceremony (the reception was held at Stafford House) King Edward and Queen Alexandra received Lord and Lady Ormonde, Lady Beatrice, and Beatrice's fiancée Major-General Sir Reginald Pole-Carew at Marlborough House, where the King and Queen presented Beatrice with a wedding present of a pair of diamonds wings with a large ruby in the centre. The King also personally presented an Indian Shawl directly to Lady Beatrice. King Edward VII's daughter Princess Victoria also gave Beatrice a wedding present of a blue enamel and diamond brooch. The King's sisters Princess Louise, Duchess of Argyll, Princess Christian of Schleswig-Holstein and Princess Henry of Battenberg gave respective wedding presents of a diamond and emerald bracelet, an antique silver and tortoiseshell casket and a gold curb bracelet. The Duke of Cornwall and York and Duchess of Cornwall and York gave the couple a diamond and enammelled pendant, and the King's brother the Duke of Connaught gave a buhl clock.

In 1952 Queen Camilla (then Miss Camilla Shand) and her sister Annabel Shand served as child bridesmaids at the wedding of their uncle The Hon. Jeremy Cubitt to Elizabeth's great-granddaughter Diana Du Cane.

==== Yachting Society ====
Lord and Lady Ormonde also were reportedly on friendly terms with Emperor Wilhelm II of Germany, who they socialised with during the annual Cowes Regatta. From the 1880's to early 1900's the Ormondes stayed on Lord Ormonde's yacht the Mirage. In 1910 Lord and Lady Ormonde leased Solent Lodge on the Isle of Wight, a seaside villa with six reception rooms and eighteen bedrooms. Solent Lodge was purchased by Lord Ormonde from Sir John Whittaker Ellis in 1911, and became a frequent site for visits from members of Europe's royal families, including The King and Queen in 1914, and the Kaiser's brother Prince Henry of Prussia, who stayed at Solent Lodge as their guest in 1913 and 1914. During her widowhood Elizabeth also hosted The Queen and Princess Beatrice at Solent Lodge in 1927.

During the First World War, Lord and Lady Ormonde loaned Solent Lodge as a nursing home for wounded British Soldiers.

== Dowager Marchioness of Ormonde ==
Elizabeth's husband James died on 26 October 1919. Upon his death, the family titles passed to his brother Lord Arthur Butler, whilst the family estates, were inherited by Arthur's elder son George. Lord Ormonde's total estate (including entailed property) was valued at approximately £450,000

Elizabeth left Kilkenny Castle in January 1920, and took up residence at Solent Lodge, Cowes, on the Isle of Wright, which she had inherited from her husband. She also continued to maintain the London Residence at 32 Upper Brook Street until 1922. The 1921 United Kingdom census household return for Solent Lodge records that Elizabeth employed a household of seven servants, including a Lady's Maid, Cook, Kitchen Maid, two Housemaids, a Pantry Boy, and a Butler (who had previously been employed as Valet to the Third Marquess of Ormonde).

Elizabeth died on 25 March 1928. Her unsettled estate was reported to be valued at £16,796, with a net personality of £7,300. She was survived by her two daughters, who sold Solent Lodge and its contents in the late 1920's.

Peerage of Ireland
Preceded by Frances Jane Paget	Marchioness of Ormonde; 1876–1919	Succeeded by Ellen Stager
