= Car coat =

Outer garment for automobilists

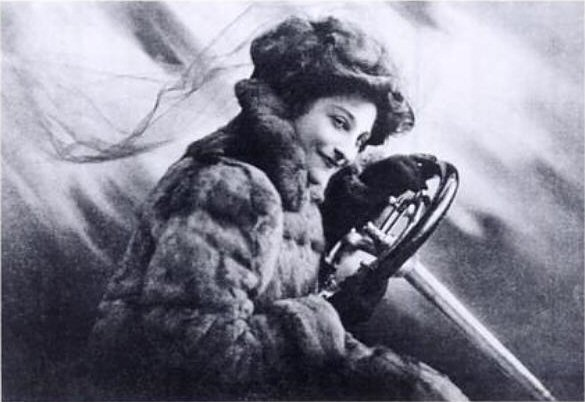
Dorothy Levitt, early motoring 'scorcher' and advisor on what to wear

A car coat is an outer garment originally made to be worn by automobile drivers and passengers. First designed to provide maximum warmth and coverage, over time it became a much shorter garment. Today it describes a coat that typically ends at mid thigh. It is worn by both men and women.

While fur, leather and heavy wool were preferred in the early days, today the coat may be made in a wide variety of materials. In the period after World War II, it took on design elements of the jeep coat worn by servicemen and this is when the shorter length became common. As car ownership grew so did the popularity of the coat; by the 1960s it was described as "ubiquitous". The car coat remains popular today, both as a functional and a fashion garment.

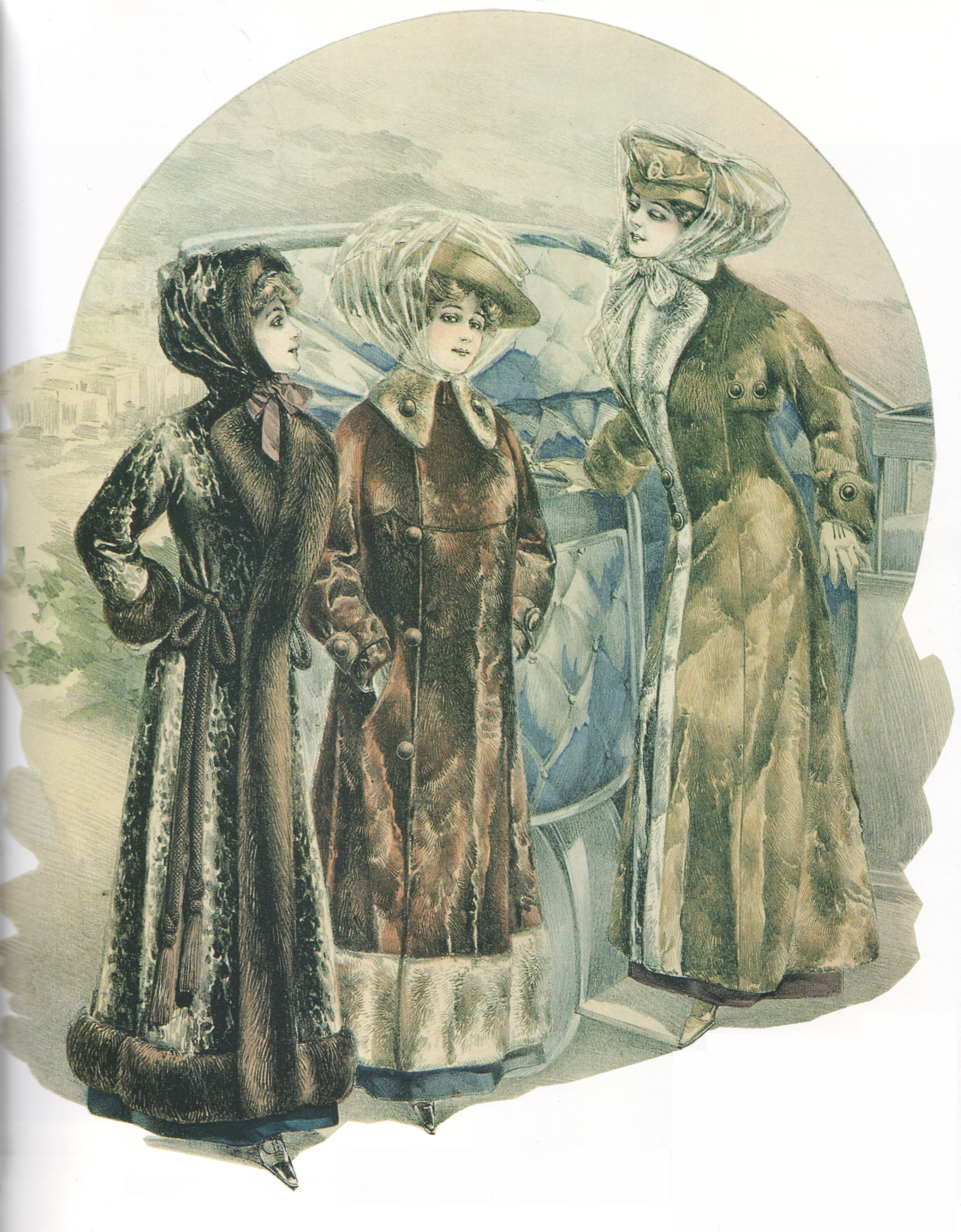
'Automobilists' fashion plate of around 1910, showing early car coats

== Early history of the car coat ==
Originally the car coat was more usually termed 'motoring dress'. It emerged in the early 1900s, when driving was considered an outdoor sport (most cars were open top) and required protective clothing. Clothing for men and women and for driver and passenger was relatively similar, comprising a long heavy coat. This was often in fur or lined with fur, although sometimes it was in heavy cloth. In summer, women would wear a duster coat, sometimes called a dust coat, to cover their garments, in a cloth such as linen or alpaca wool. This would be accessorised with gloves, goggles and a hat – women often wore elaborate hats and veils, while men would wear a cap. These accessories were worn year round.

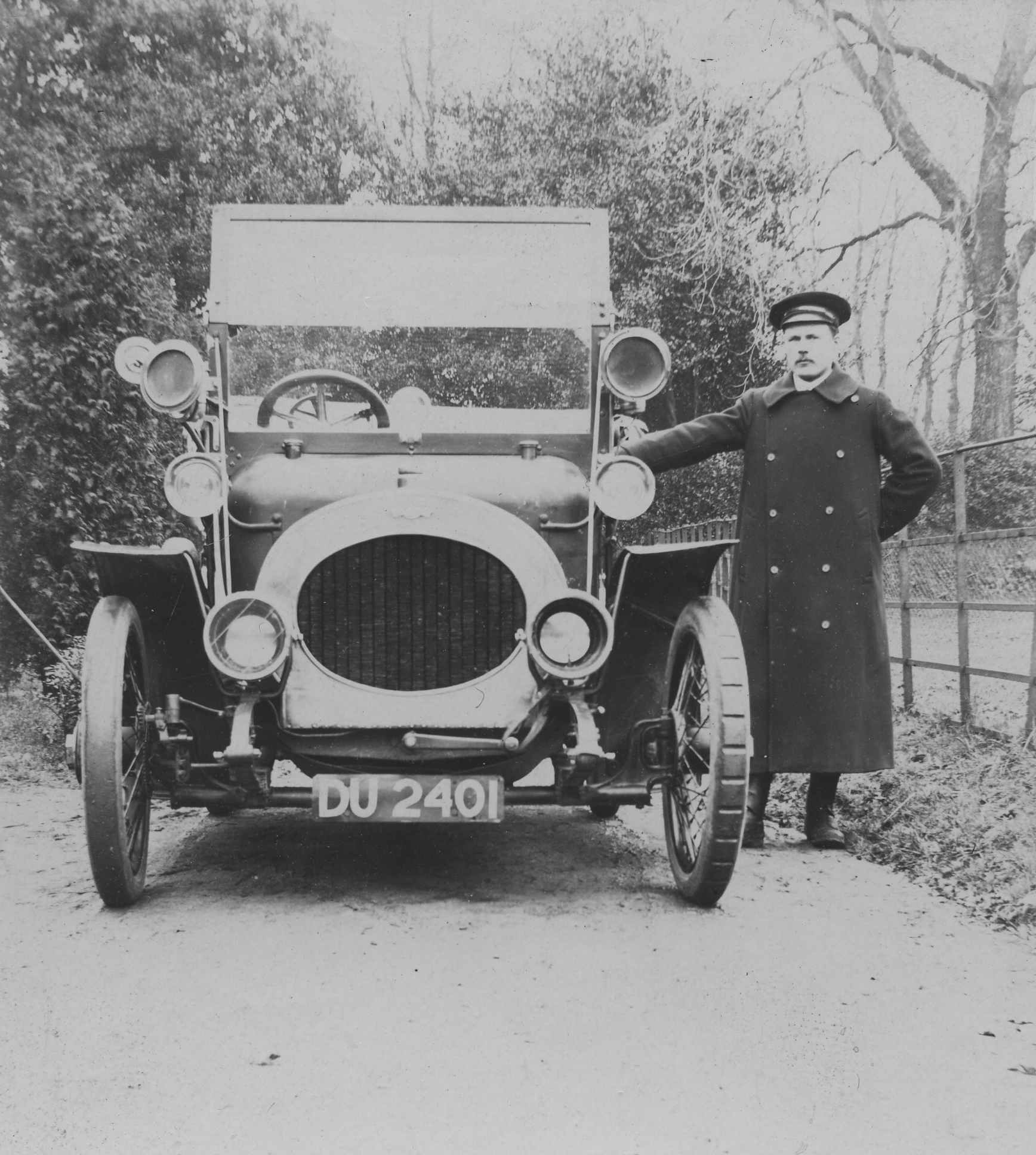
A chauffeur, in around 1910. Similar heavy greatcoats in wool or leather were worn by male and female drivers

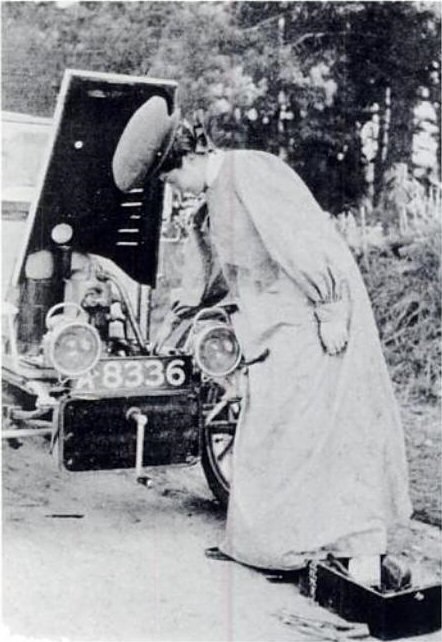
Dorothy Levitt priming a carburettor and wearing an early version of a motoring 'duster' coat

Motoring was still an activity for the elite, however the privations of driving in a vehicle that broke down frequently and provided no retreat from the elements, meant clothing had to be functional and warm. Sports motorist Dorothy Levitt – author of the 1909 handbook The Woman and the Car and dubbed 'the fastest woman on earth' for her 'scorching' (speeding) antics round tracks such as Brooklands – provided useful tips for women drivers on what to wear, along with guidance about the mechanical aspects of driving. On choosing the right coat, she said: "Under no circumstance wear lace or fluffy adjuncts to your toilet. There is nothing like a thick frieze, homespun or tweed coat lined with fur. Do not heed the cry, 'nothing like leather.' Leather coats do not wear gracefully."

== 1920s styles ==
In the 1920s, women continued to favour male motoring dress and this also crossed over into high fashion. A 1921 article in The Times about the latest Paris fashions described a red leather motoring coat fastened with metal buckles. Similar leather coats had been popular for chauffeurs and male motorists for several years. Fur was still popular, with a fashion correspondent noting that the Motor Show in Olympia was transforming shop windows around London. She recommended the latest craze for fur-lined coats in tweed, wool velour and cheviot. Musquash and nutria were also being chosen by women motorists, while in Knightsbridge, one new store was offering women's coats suitable for motoring made from men's suiting cloth.

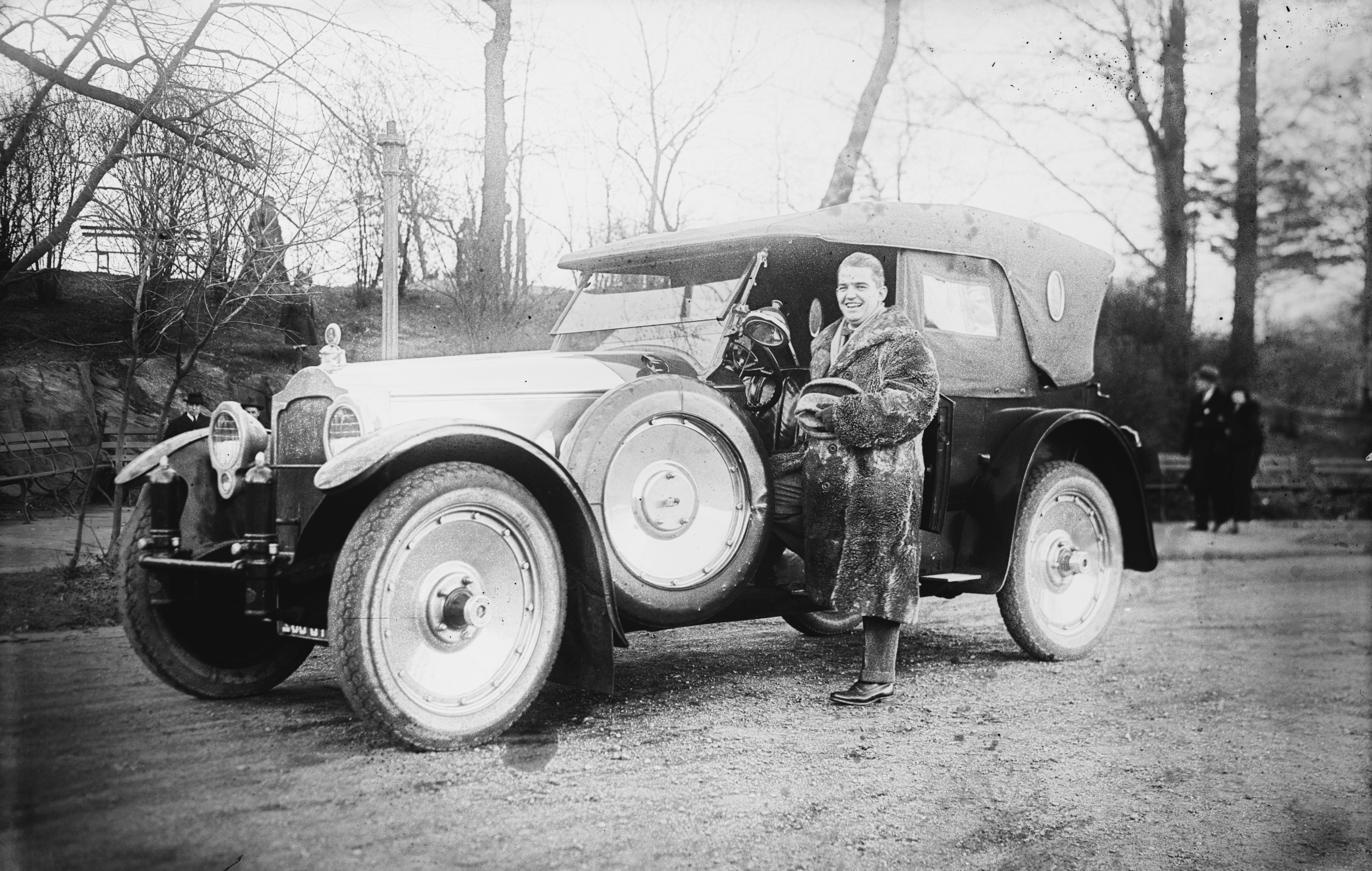
Composer Zez Confrey wearing a fur motoring coat – fur would remain popular driving gear for men and women

Accessories also followed the unisex trend; The Times described the arrival of neat leather caps as a fashion accessory for women in 1923. This style of sporty hat was worn in the iconic Tamara de Lempicka self-portrait of 1929 in which she is driving a green Bugatti with leather cap and driving gloves – reputed to be based on an Hermès set that she had seen on the cover of the magazine Vu. As this portrait suggests, and Peter Thorold has noted, the car had become the ultimate symbol of modernity and emancipation, something that was reflected in the styling of clothes. Although no coat is visible in the de Lempicka portrait, by the late 1920s the latest motoring coats from France were worn long, made of tweed or flannel with narrow leather belts and collars in fur or flannel. Wide raglan sleeves were popular – allowing freedom of movement – and collars could be military in style with buttons up to the neck.

Reporting on fashions in the shops ahead of the 1931 Motor Show, The Times described not only furs, but a new trend for shorter coats – made of suede and silk lined with zips as fastening – for walking and motoring. As cars became more common and designs provided more protection from the elements, clothing reduced in weight and quantity. However the leather motoring coat remained popular as a distinct item of dress throughout the 1930s.

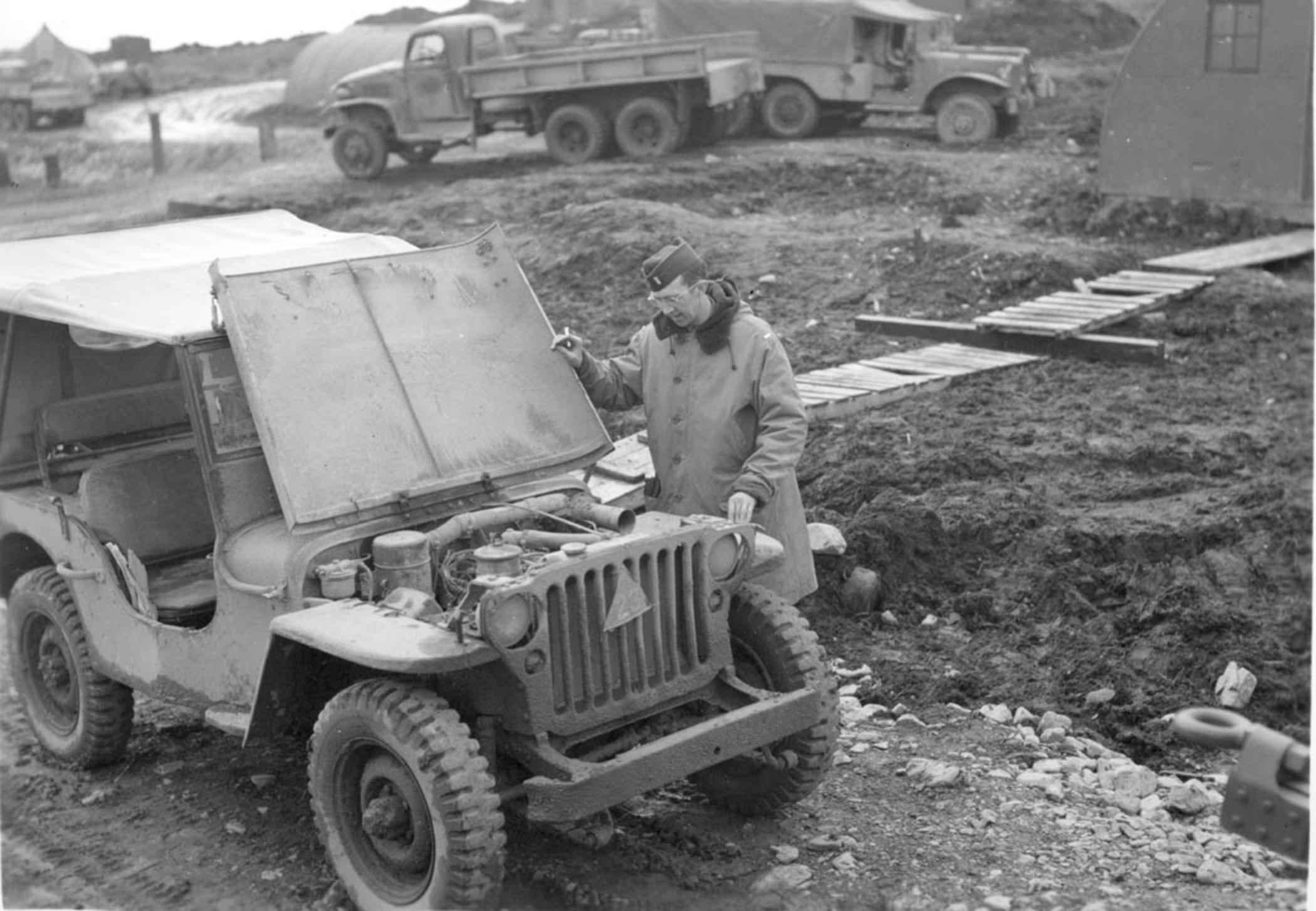
The jeep coat – as worn by servicemen during World War II – was the forerunner to the modern car coat

== Postwar designs ==
The immediate precursor to the postwar (modern) car coat was based around the jeep coat, a design popular in wartime for the drivers of open-topped vehicles. This was generally of a shorter length, ending at mid thigh.

By the early 1960s, some car coats were being designed in nylon, a report from the British Nylon Spinners' Fair in London in 1961 described a new washable mock suede car coat with brushed fleece nylon lining as: "one of the good possibilities" of the technology. Real leathers remained popular – showerproof suede models with detachable collars and large leather buttons were being designed for women by 1964. These were also in the shorter length, ending at mid thigh. Another new motoring design was the roebuck suede (deerskin) jacket, designed at hip length for both women and men, and described as a real innovation because: "A suede upon which grease, alcohol, even motor oil has no effect is a find indeed."

Warmth was still considered a key component of the car coat, with water-repellent poplin models with padded and quilted linings being designed for women as "knock-about car coats". These came complete with detachable hoods and toggle fastenings. Fur was still being promoted for motorists, but as a prestige item to go with prestige cars. An advert from 1965 in The Times by the National Fur Company entitled "An ocelot in your Jaguar" said: "We consider that an important feature of a car coat is its length – about halfway between a jacket and a 3/4 coat. At this length, it's comfortable to wear when driving. It doesn't ride up. Or 'seat'. And there is no risk of undue wear on the seat or back."

== The "ubiquitous" car coat ==
By the late 1960s, the car coat was an item of leisurewear, rather than simply a motoring accessory, and was being produced in a variety of fabrics, including sheepskin and the new manmade fur varieties. A fashion writer describing the uses of faux fur said: "Apart from coats they are made into all kinds of leisure wear, of which the now ubiquitous car coat is a conspicuous example. Derived from the more expensive but still popular sheepskin jacket, it is usually made from a cotton suedette or brushed nylon outer fabric lined with an acrylic pile".

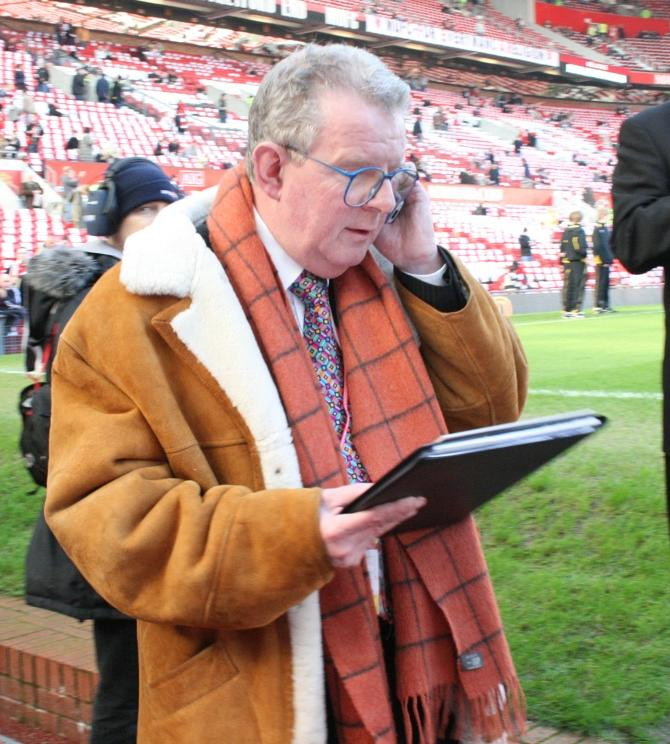
Football commentator John Motson got his first car coat in 1972, subsequently having them tailored in Savile Row

While women continued to wear the car-coat length – among others – by the mid-1960s the car coat had become a staple item of the male wardrobe. Editor of The Tailor and Cutter magazine John Taylor, writing in 1966, said: "The riding mac was the equivalent in the nineteen twenties and thirties of the car coat of the nineteen fifties and sixties. If a riding mac was worn there was the suggestion that it had been bought for a specific purpose. The wearer probably owned a hack and therefore was not a member of the hoi polloi. For similar reasons today, however submerged in the psyches of their owners the reasons may lie, there are far more car coats in male wardrobes than there are cars in garages."

Although the car coat was by now a familiar item, it did not mean it couldn't be reinvented. Michael Carr, who had designed an ergonomic racing suit for his company's co-director Stirling Moss applied first design principles to add functionality. Made of waterproofed poplin, his design of 1968 featured a zip front and separate velcro quick fasten strip. Buttons were designed so they didn't catch on the car seat belt, gathered cuffs excluded draughts and pockets were designed to fall on the knee while seated in the car. There was also an interior deep pocket for roadmaps. During the 1970s, the car coat continued to be a wardrobe staple for men, while car coat became a description of cut and length in women's fashion (often looser and always shorter than a traditional coat).

=== Car coats in popular culture ===
In late 1960s U.K., "shearling" car coats were favored by early skinheads. From the 1980s on, the men's car coat started to symbolise a particular character or walk of life on British TV and in the press, especially when worn in sheepskin or camel hair. Sheepskin was the style favoured by Del Boy in Only Fools & Horses and by football managers. It was also worn by detectives in The Sweeney. Later, the Life on Mars detective series, in which the hero is transported back to the 1970s, would reprise the car coat by giving DCI Gene Hunt a scruffy version in camel wool. More celebrated still are the trademarked sheepskin car coats worn by BBC football commentator John Motson – he wore his first in 1972, acquired from a furrier he met at a party in Chelsea, and subsequently had them made on Savile Row. It had become such a shorthand description for British football pundits by the late 1990s that a Times feature about the warm-up for the 1998 World Cup began with the description: "Paul Sexton, our man in the sheepskin car coat, on the tournament for the World Cup".

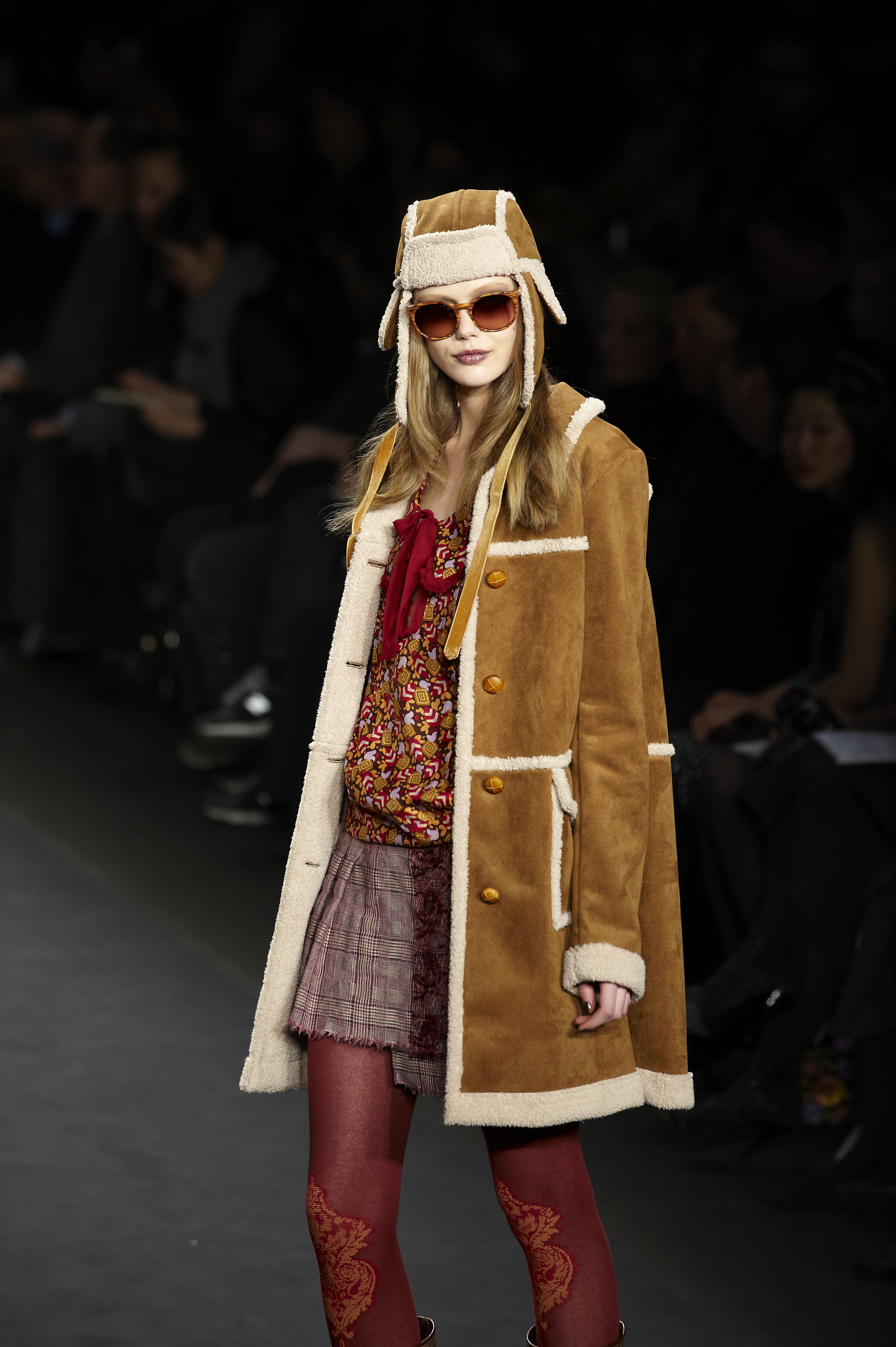
Anna Sui shearling car coat at Fall 2010 New York Fashion Week

The character of James Bond, as portrayed by actor Timothy Dalton, wore a black leather car coat made by Kenzō Takada in key scenes of 1987's The Living Daylights movie, the 15th film of the popular British motion picture franchise.

Fantasy and science fiction author Michael Moorcock's Jerry Cornelius often wears car coats.

== Fashion revivals ==
In the late 1990s the car coat attracted attention as a fashion curiosity when Liam Gallagher, lead singer of the Britpop band, Oasis, wore a sheepskin model to the 1996 Brit Awards; Craig David wore a similar design in 2001. The car coat length has remained popular since 2008 – with GQ citing the "Mad Men effect" as a contributor to the revival of more formal and retro styles.

In 2010–11, it was popular on the catwalks for both men's and women's coats. Some versions were in fur and shearling (sheepskin), as well as in camel colourways. In 2013, it was described as the best coat length of the season.
