= George O'Callaghan, 2nd Viscount Lismore =

Irish peer and British Army officer

George Ponsonby O'Callaghan
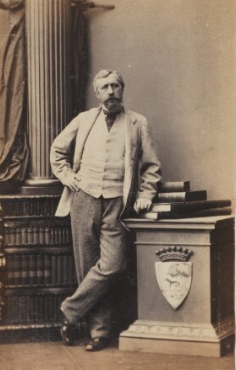
- 2nd Viscount Lismore of Shanbally in 1861
- Born: 16 March 1815; Ireland
- Died: 29 October 1898 (aged 83); London, England
- Occupations: Peer, British Army officer
- Known for: 2nd Viscount Lismore, Lord Lieutenant of Tipperary
- Spouse: Mary Norbury
- Children: George O'Callaghan, William O'Callaghan Burlington Street

George Ponsonby O'Callaghan, 2nd Viscount Lismore (16 March 1815 – 29 October 1898) was an Irish peer and British Army officer.

== Biography ==
He was the third and only surviving son of Cornelius O'Callaghan, 1st Viscount Lismore and Lady Eleanor Butler, daughter of John Butler, 17th Earl of Ormonde.

He commissioned into the 17th Lancers and served with the regiment in the Crimean War. He held the office of High Sheriff of Tipperary in 1853. On 30 May 1857 he succeeded to his father's titles and assumed his seat in the House of Lords. He also succeeded his father as Lord Lieutenant of Tipperary and held the position until 1885.

He married Mary Norbury, daughter of George Norbury of Fulmer, Buckinghamshire, on 25 July 1839, and together they had two sons:

- George O'Callaghan (1846-1885) who married Rosina Williams in Ambala, India, but died without issue.
- William O'Callaghan (1852-1877) who served as MP for Tipperary. He died unmarried and without issue.

Both sons predeceased Lord Lismore, leaving no heir, and his titles became extinct upon his death.

Lord Lismore died in London on 29 October 1898. Lady Lismore died at their home in London on 15 April 1900.

The Lismores had a home in Ireland at Shanbally Castle and also in Mayfair, London. They lived at 34 Grosvenor Street from 1863-1867, then at 31 Old Burlington Street from 1867 until the death of Lady Lismore in 1900. Lord Lismore had reportedly made it known that, following the deaths of his two sons, his first-cousin once-removed Lord Arthur Butler would be the heir to the Lismore Estates. However following his death, his will revealed that he had instead named the daughter's of Lord Arthur's older brother James Butler, 3rd Marquess of Ormonde Lady Beatrice Butler and Lady Constance Butler as the co-heiresses of his estates, subject to a life interest granted to his widow.

When he died, his estates comprised over 47,000 acres which had an annual rent-roll of £18,435.

Honorary titles
Preceded by The Viscount Lismore	Lord Lieutenant of Tipperary; 1857–1885	Succeeded by The Earl de Montalt
Peerage of Ireland
Preceded by Cornelius O'Callaghan	Viscount Lismore; 1857–1898	Extinct
