= Irish Land Commission =

Public body from 1843 to 1999

The Irish Land Commission was created by the British crown in 1843 to "inquire into the occupation of the land in Ireland. The office of the commission was in Dublin Castle, and the records were, on its conclusion, deposited in the records tower there, from whence they were transferred in 1898 to the Public Record Office". It took on the role of a rent fixing commission in 1881 under the Land Law (Ireland) Act 1881 (also known as the second Irish Land Act). For a century it was the body responsible for re-distributing farmland in most of Ireland. It was formally abolished in 1999.

== UK Land Acts ==
Under the Purchase of Land (Ireland) Act 1885 (the Ashbourne Act), the commission developed into a tenant-purchasing commission and assisted in the agreed transfer of freehold farmland from landlord to tenant. This was a response to the turbulent Land War that had started in 1879. It was rapidly enacted by the government of Prime Minister The Marquess of Salisbury, was funded initially with £5,000,000, and was designed to avert support for the Irish Parliamentary Party, given the larger number of voters allowed by the Representation of the People Act 1884, before the IPP entered an alliance with William Ewart Gladstone in 1886.

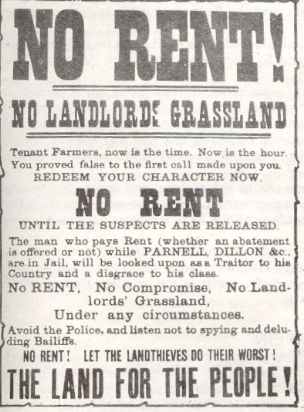
Irish Land League poster, 1880s

The commission eventually transferred 13.5 million acres (55,000 km^{2}) by 1920. Following the Land Conference of December 1902 arranged by the Chief Secretary for Ireland George Wyndham, the Land Purchase (Ireland) Act 1903 was steered through Parliament by William O'Brien, which provided government finance to buy out freeholds, with the former tenant farmers paying back the capital over 68 years. This was managed by the Land Commission, along with ancillary work such as compiling statistics. Valuations were reckoned on a years purchase (Y.P.) basis, the price being a multiple of (perhaps 16 times) the annual rent, instead of the discounted cash flow method used today. The commission had to supervise the haggling process and find the fairest multiple for every transfer. The loans issued by the government were resold in the capital markets as Land Bonds.

By 1908 the emerging problem was whether the new owners would be economically viable on their small farms. Michael McDonnell commented, "The breaking up of the grazing lands, which in many instances the landlords are keeping back from the market, has not met with much success under the Act, and it is difficult to see how compulsion is to be avoided if the country is to be saved from the economically disastrous position of having established in it a number of occupying owners on tenancies which are not large enough to secure to them a living wage."

It was realised by now that existing rural poverty arose from small farm sizes, yet the procedures and limits of the acts also tended to keep farm sizes down. The aim had been to create "peasant proprietors" owning what were usually small farms. By definition, the activists in the 1880s Land War period had been poorer and more desperate, and few came from larger prosperous farms. This remained a matter of policy debate for the rest of the commission's existence; generally, it continued to create new small units by breaking up larger units that had more commercial potential. Larger commercial farmers were characterised as "landlords" or "grazers" simply because they had more land than the average.

The Irish Land Act 1909, fostered by the Liberal Chief Secretary for Ireland, Augustine Birrell, allowed for tenanted land purchase where the owner was unwilling to sell, to be bought by the commission by compulsory purchase.

In 1915, Chief Secretary Birrell confirmed in Parliament that all Irish land transfers from 1885 to the end of 1914 had cost the British Government £91,768,450, and the tenants had invested a further £1,584,516.

== 1920: Dáil decree ==
During the Irish War of Independence in the early 1920s, some farms were seized, and in June 1920 the Dáil debated a motion proposed by Arthur Griffith as Minister for Home Affairs, and approved a decree stating that all claims to land should not be adjudicated on until after the end of the war.

== 1922–23: abolition and re-establishment ==
The Irish Free State (Consequential Provisions) Act 1922 abolished many all-island offices, including the Land Commissioners, effective from the creation of the Irish Free State on 6 December 1922, with Northern Ireland remaining within the United Kingdom. The Land Commission files for Northern Ireland were separated, allowing for the Land Commission to be re-established in and for the Free State in 1923 as if it had never been abolished.

== Northern Ireland ==
The Land Acts were varied in Northern Ireland in 1925, and the activities of the Land Commission were finally abolished in 1935. Some remaining tenants who had chosen not to exercise their right to buy their farms formed the Unbought Tenants' Association.

== Irish Land Acts ==
The commission was reconstituted in the Irish Free State by the Land Law (Commission) Act 1923, backdated to the state's creation. The act also dissolved the Congested Districts Board (the CDB). Provision was made for compulsory purchase of land owned by a non-Irish citizen. Untenanted land could now be compulsorily purchased and divided out to local families; this was applied unevenly across the State, with some large estates surviving if the owners could show that their land was being actively farmed.

From 1923, the amounts outstanding were paid to the British government as land annuities, accruing in a Land Purchase Fund. This was fixed at £250,000 annually in 1925. In December 1925 W. T. Cosgrave lamented that there were already: "250,000 occupiers of uneconomic holdings, the holdings of such a valuation as did not permit of a decent livelihood for the owners". Despite this, his government continued to subdivide larger landholdings, primarily to gain electoral support.

The Land Act 1933, passed on a vote of 70–39, allowed the Minister for Finance to divert the annuities for local government projects. This was a factor in the Anglo-Irish Trade War from 1933 to 1938, and was mutually resolved by a one-off payment of £10m to Britain in 1938. From 1932 the government argued strongly that Irish farmers should no longer be obliged for historic reasons to pay Britain for Irish land, but when Britain had passed out of the payment system it still required farmers to continue to pay their annuities to it as before.

The commission, whilst often regarded as the champion of land ownership for those who used it, and social justice, was not without controversy. In particular its subdivision of land into uneconomic units has had a lasting effect, as well as the destruction of fine landlords' residences such as Monellan Castle and Shanbally Castle with Government approval. As farming became more mechanized from the 1930s, foreign investment in commercial farms was discouraged, reducing overall farm output. Often the buyers found it hard to earn enough to live a good life, as found in the poems of Patrick Kavanagh. The Dáil reports from the 1920s to the 1960s frequently include questions about the division of former estates, and the acquisition of land with public finance on favourable terms for constituents via the Land Commission was understood as a way for politicians to gain electoral support.

== Policy changes and dissolution ==
From 1940, a minority in Fianna Fáil and coalition cabinets consistently argued for larger farms to be encouraged, instead of sponsoring new small farmers that often had too little capital, skills or enthusiasm. This was successfully opposed for social and political reasons by Éamon de Valera, and in coalition governments by Joseph Blowick, the leader of Clann na Talmhan.

Under the 1923 Act, busier farmers had to rent extra land under an 11-month or seasonal conacre system, as longer arrangements could cause an owner to lose his farm by compulsory purchase by the Land Commission. While there were now some 300,000 Irish landowners compared to several thousand in the late nineteenth-century, the basic term for the use of land had reverted to the norm of the 1860s, with no rights to renew a lease and no incentive to improve rented land. By 1980, some 860,000 acres (3,500 km^{2}) in the state were rented annually under conacre, suggesting a new imbalance between mere ownership and the more active farmers. The cost of agricultural machinery requires larger farm sizes to generate economies of scale.

The Lands Act 1965 was passed to restrict new foreign investment in agriculture, some of which was speculatively based upon the Ireland's planned entry into the European Economic Community, which occurred in 1973. The EEC's Four Freedoms allowed for investment within the EEC by any citizen of an EEC member state. This naturally undermined the ethos of the Land Commission, which had processed a further 807,000 acres (3,270 km^{2}) since 1923. By the early 1970s, half of open market land purchases were by non-farmers, and half of those were to buy small sites, typically for building bungalows.

By the 1980s, just before its reform, the Land Commission was a body responsible to the Department of Agriculture. In 1983, the Commission ceased acquiring land; this signified the start of the end of the commission's reform of Irish land ownership, though freehold transfers of farmland still had to be signed off by the Commission into the 1990s. The Lands Section of the Department of Agriculture was seen as an overgrown entity, employing 750 people in 1983; its budget of IR£15m included IR£8m for administration costs and only IR£7m for actual land purchase or division. Further purchases were suspended that year by Paul Connaughton, Minister of State at the Department of Agriculture. Civil servants working for the Land Commission were reassigned to work on related matters. The Irish Land Commission (Dissolution) Act 1992 gave the Minister for Agriculture the power to formally dissolve the commission. In proposing this legislation, Minister Michael O'Kennedy explained the bill's provisions:

The Bill is designed to give statutory effect to the position which has obtained since 1983. In short, the Bill provides for the dissolution of the Land Commission; the revocation of the power of the State to take over land, except by exchange, for land settlement purposes; the transfer to the President of the High Court of the jurisdictions vested in the Office of the judicial commissioner and in the appeal tribunal; the transfer to the Minister for Agriculture and Food of certain functions of the commission and the four lay commissioners, mainly to allow for the disposal of land on hand and for the continuation of controls in the purchase of land by non-qualified persons; the transfer to the Minister of all land and other property vested in the commission, with the exception of fishing rights and fisheries which will be transferred to the Central Fisheries Board; and the payment of compensation to the lay commissioners.

The act came into force in 1999. Most of the remaining liabilities and assets were transferred to the Minister for Agriculture and Food. Many relevant historical records are held by the National Archives of Ireland.
