= Shanbally Castle =

Historic site in County Tipperary, Ireland

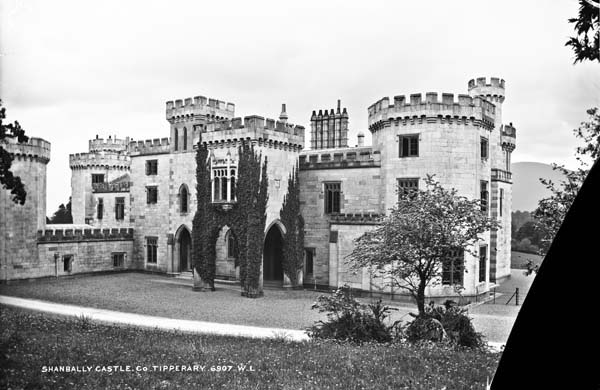
- Front elevation of the former castle

- Location within Ireland
- 52°17′34″N 08°02′37″W
- Location: Clogheen, County Tipperary, Ireland.

History
- Built: 19th Century
- Built for: Cornelius O'Callaghan
- Demolished: 1960

Site notes
- Architect: John Nash

Shanbally Castle was located near Clogheen, County Tipperary and built for Cornelius O'Callaghan, 1st Viscount Lismore in around 1810. It was the largest house built in Ireland by the noted English architect John Nash. The castle was acquired by the Irish Land Commission in 1954. On 21 March 1960 the castle, after much controversy, was demolished.

== Ownership ==
Shanbally Castle was commissioned c. 1812 for Lord Lismore, who kept it as his principal seat until his death in 1857. The property then devolved to his only surviving son, George O'Callaghan, 2nd Viscount Lismore.

Following the deaths of his two sons, the 2nd Viscount Lismore bequeathed Shanbally to the great-granddaughters of his mother's brother John Butler, 17th Earl of Ormonde, Lady Beatrice Butler and Lady Constance Butler, who inherited the Castle and Estate following the deaths of Lord Lismore in 1898 and his widow in 1900. The peerage of Viscount Lismore became extinct following Lord Lismore's death. In 1899 the Shanbally Estate was worth an estimated £25,000 annually, although the actual income produced was likely £18,500.

Lady Beatrice, her husband Lt. Gen. Sir Reginald Pole-Carew, and Lady Constance hosted the King, the Queen, and Princess Victoria at Shanbally on 3 May 1904.

In December 1946 the house was being advertised for long-term rentals in Country Life Magazine, which listed the owner as the Shanbally Estate Company. The advertisement described the Castle as containing nine reception rooms, fourteen bedrooms, six dressing rooms, servants apartments, central heating, telephone and electrity access, and thousands of acres of shooting rights in addition to the land comprising the Castle's demense. The house continued to be advertised as being available for rent, including as a "country club, hotel, or other similar purpose" in December 1947, and reportedly then contained 8 reception rooms (including those allocated for servants), 28 bedrooms, six bathrooms, partial central heating, and 7,000 acres of shooting rights.

Following the deaths of Lady Constance in 1949 and Lady Beatrice in 1953, Shanbally Castle was sold by Lady Beatrice's younger son Major Patrick Pole-Carew to the Irish Land Commission in 1954.

== Destruction ==
The protests against the demolition of Shanbally Castle came from some local sources, An Taisce, a few academics such as Professor Gwynn and some political voices such as Senator Sean Moylan, the Minister for Agriculture until his death in November 1957, and TD from Mitchelstown, John W Moher. Politically, the Fianna Fáil Government had no love for houses of the ascendancy and local TD Michael Davern was in favour of its demolition.

For a brief period it seemed that a purchaser could be found in the form of the London theatre critic Edward Charles Sackville-West, 5th Baron Sackville, who had a tremendous love of the Clogheen area, which he had known since childhood. He agreed to buy the castle, together with 163 acres (0.66 km^{2}), but pulled out of the transaction when the Irish Land Commission refused to stop cutting trees in the land he intended to buy.

When this sale did not happen, the Irish Government claimed that it could not find another suitable owner for the castle.

In March 1960, The Nationalist reported the final end of a building which was once the pride of the neighbourhood. "A big bang yesterday ended Shanbally Castle, where large quantities of gelignite and cortex shattered the building," it said. The explosion could be heard up to 10 miles (16 km) away.

A statement from the Irish Government released after the demolition of the Castle said in response to protests favouring the retention of Shanbally Castle for the nation: "Apart from periods of military occupation the castle remained wholly unoccupied for 40 years".

== Activities ==
The 1st Viscount established a successful agricultural output on the Shanbally Castle demesne, with many entries to regional competitions of various classes continuing with the 2nd Viscount. His cross-breed sheep were particularly prized in Ireland for their fine wool, while also returning value for their meat. Having bought imported fine wooled Merinos in 1810 and South Downs in 1813, he cross-bred them with his native mountain sheep on the Galtees. His flock of 915 sheep survived the Irish climate quite successfully, according to a report addressed to the directors of the Farming Society of Ireland promoting the domestic fine wool industry as early as 1820. Alternately, the short-lived Merino Woollen Mills in Kilkenny also imported Merinos in 1810, but did not cross-breed and went brankcrupt in 1822. Fleece from Viscount Lismore's flock was particularly supplied to the Ardfinnan Woollen Mills from the 1870s.
