= Cheviot (cloth) =

Woven fabric made originally from the wool of Cheviot sheep

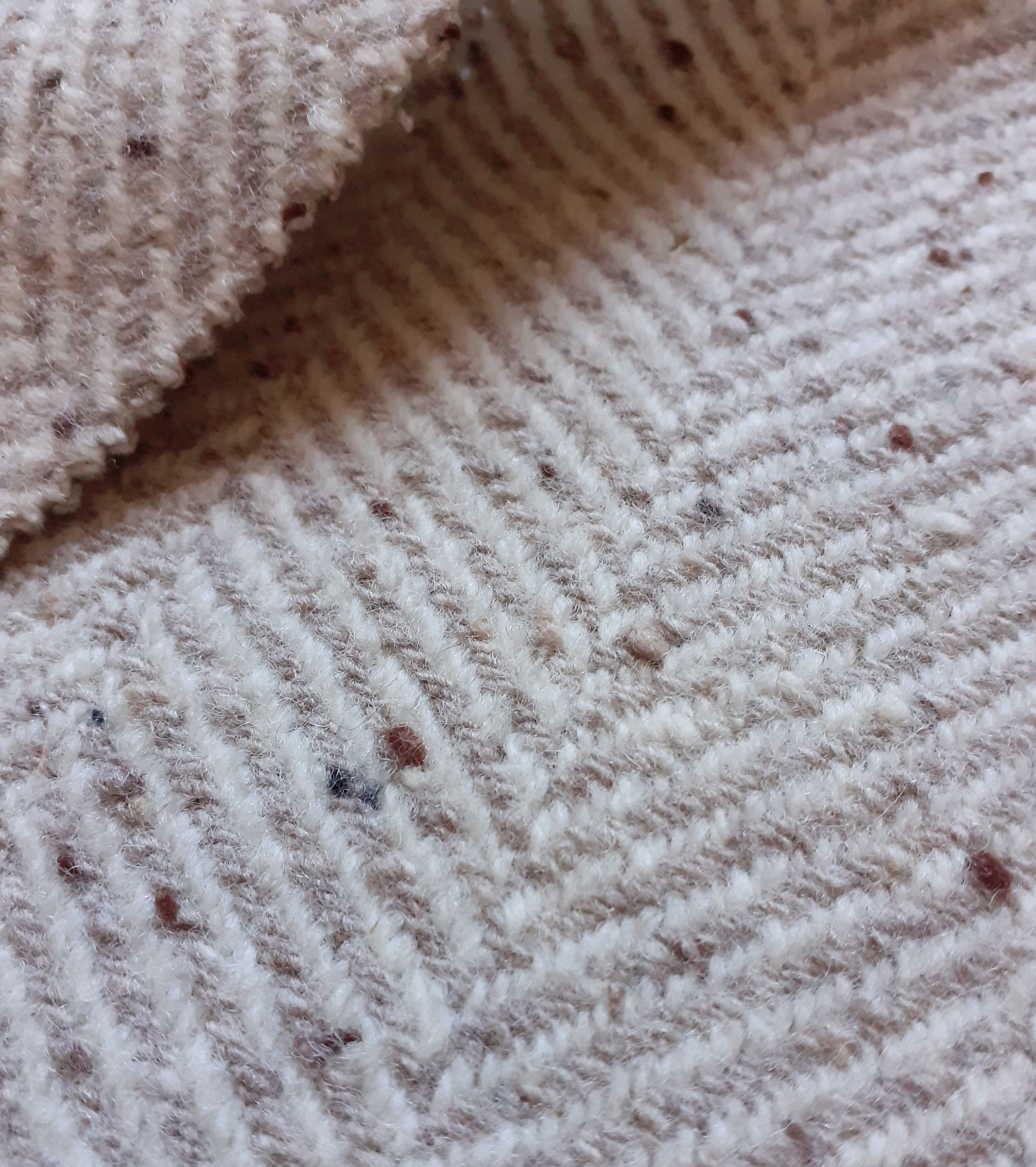

Cheviot is a woolen fabric made originally from the wool of Cheviot sheep and now also made from other types of wool or from blends of wool and man-made fibers in plain or various twill weaves. The cheviot sheep originate on the border of England and Scotland, and their name is derived from Cheviot Hills, a range of hills in north Northumberland and the Scottish Borders. Cheviot wool possesses good spinning qualities, since the fiber is fine, soft, and pliable. It has a crispness of texture similar to serge but is slightly rougher and heavier.

Cheviot fabric may be produced either from woolen or worsted yarns according to the character, texture, and feel desired in the finished fabric. Some qualities are produced from crossbred worsted yarns adapted for furnishing crispness. The wool is known for its resilience and durability, often used for socks, sweaters, blankets, and jackets. In addition, Cheviot cloth value ranges in GDP is £0.97, and the competitors offer is £0.55. Cheviot suitings for sportswear are made from harder spun worsted yarns, and some are also made from botany worsted. Cheviot shirting is a stout, twilled, cotton fabric woven with small geometrical patterns or with warp stripes and bleached weft.
