= Butler (surname) =

Butler is a surname that has been associated with many different places and people. It can be either:

- an Anglicisation of the French surname Boutilier, Bouthillier, a cognate of the English name.
- an English occupational name that originally denoted a servant in charge of the wine cellar, from the Norman French word butuiller. It eventually came to be used to describe a servant of high responsibility in a noble household, mostly leaving behind its association with the supply of wine.
- in Ireland, a noble family and dynasty associated with the counties of Tipperary, Kilkenny and parts of County Carlow. They were seated at Kilkenny Castle, and at Cahir Castle.
- an Anglicisation of German or Swiss-German surnames including Beutler, Bütler, Beidler.

== Notable people with the surname Butler ==
=== Disambiguation of common given names with this surname ===
- Adam Butler (disambiguation), multiple people
- Andrew Butler (disambiguation), multiple people
- Anthony Butler (disambiguation), multiple people
- Arthur Butler (disambiguation), multiple people
- Benjamin Butler (disambiguation), multiple people
- Bill Butler (disambiguation), multiple people
- Brett Butler (disambiguation), multiple people
- Charles Butler (disambiguation), multiple people
- Chris Butler (disambiguation), multiple people
- David Butler (disambiguation), multiple people
- Daniel Butler (disambiguation), multiple people
- Edward Butler (disambiguation), multiple people
- Eleanor Butler (disambiguation), multiple people
- Frank Butler (disambiguation), multiple people
- George Butler (disambiguation), multiple people
- Guy Butler (disambiguation), multiple people
- Jack Butler (disambiguation), multiple people
- James Butler (disambiguation), includes Jim Butler and Jimmy Butler
- Jason Butler (disambiguation), multiple people
- Jerry Butler (disambiguation), multiple people
- John Butler (disambiguation), multiple people
- Joseph Butler (disambiguation), multiple people
- Josh Butler (disambiguation), multiple people
- Kevin Butler (disambiguation), multiple people
- Matthew Butler (disambiguation), multiple people
- Michael Butler (disambiguation), multiple people
- Paul Butler (disambiguation), multiple people
- Percy Butler (disambiguation), multiple people
- Pierce Butler (disambiguation), multiple people
- Richard Butler (disambiguation), multiple people
- Robert Butler (disambiguation), multiple people
- Samuel Butler (disambiguation), multiple people
- Sarah Butler (disambiguation), multiple people
- Thomas Butler (disambiguation), multiple people
- Tom Butler (disambiguation), multiple people
- Tony Butler (disambiguation), multiple people
- Walter Butler (disambiguation), multiple people
- William Butler (disambiguation), multiple people

=== Arts and letters ===
- Archie Butler (actor) (1911–1977), American actor, crewman, and stuntman
- Artt Butler (born 1969), American voice actor
- Austin Butler (born 1991), American actor
- Bernard Butler (born 1970), English musician, of McAlmont and Butler
- Bisa Butler (born 1973), American quilt artist
- Blair Butler (born 1977), American comedy writer/comedian
- Brian Patrick Butler, American actor and filmmaker
- Bryon Butler (1934–2001), English sports writer and broadcaster
- Champ Butler (1926–1992), American popular music singer
- Charlotte Butler, 17th-century English actress
- Cher Butler (born 1964), American model and actor
- Clementina Butler (1862–1949), American evangelist and author
- Dan Butler, American actor
- Daws Butler, American voice actor
- Dean Butler (actor), Canadian/American actor
- Dori Hillestad Butler, American author of children's books
- Édith Butler, Acadian-Canadian singer-songwriter
- Ellis Parker Butler, American writer
- Elizabeth Thompson, Lady Butler, English artist
- Francis Butler (dog trainer), American writer and dog-trainer
- Geezer Butler (born 1949), English musician, bass guitar player in Black Sabbath
- Gerald Butler (writer) (1907–1988), English writer and screenwriter
- Gerard Butler, Scottish actor
- Grace Butler, New Zealand artist
- Gwendoline Butler (1922–2013), English writer
- Henry Butler, American jazz pianist
- Hubert Butler, Irish essayist
- Hugo Butler, Canadian screenwriter
- Jazz Ishmael Butler, American rapper and singer known professionally as Lil Tracy
- Jonathan Butler, South African singer-songwriter
- Judith Butler, American feminist philosopher and queer theorist
- Larry Butler (producer), American country music producer
- Linda Butler, American photographer
- Marcus Butler, British vlogger
- Matt Butler, American singer-songwriter
- Mildred Anne Butler (1858–1941), Irish artist
- Nickolas Butler, American writer
- Octavia E. Butler (1947–2006), American science fiction writer
- Oobah Butler, author and filmmaker
- Rachel Barton Butler (died 1920), American writer, lyricist and playwright
- Ralph Butler, British lyricist
- Reg Butler, English sculptor
- Rhett Ayers Butler, American environmental journalist
- Roland C. Butler (1887–1961), American circus press agent and illustrator
- Ross Butler (actor) (born 1990), American actor
- Shay Butler, YouTube personality and vlogger
- Terry Butler, American musician
- Wanda Nero Butler (born 1958), American gospel musician
- Win Butler (born 1980), American musician
- Yancy Butler, American actor

=== Politics, law ===
- Christine Butler (1943–2017), British politician
- Colvin G. Butler (1872–1961), American politician
- David Butler (politician) (1829–1891), first Governor of Nebraska
- Dawn Butler (born 1969), British politician
- Eleanor Butler Sanders (1849–1905), American suffragist, civil rights activist
- Elizabeth Butler-Sloss, English judge
- Frederick Butler (1873–1961), British civil servant
- Gordon H. Butler (1889–1964), American civil engineer and politician
- Homer M. Butler, American politician
- Josephine Butler, English activist of the Victorian era
- Laphonza Butler (born c. 1979), American politician
- Louis B. Butler, American judge
- Manley Caldwell Butler (1925–2014), U.S. Representative from Virginia
- Marion Butler, American politician
- Marty Butler, American politician
- Milo Butler, governor-general of the Bahamas
- Patty Butler (born 1952), American politician
- Petra Butler, New Zealand legal academic
- Robin Butler, British civil servant
- Tubal Uriah Butler, Grenadian labour leader in Trinidad and Tobago
- Turner Butler (1869–1938), justice of the Arkansas Supreme Court
- Walker Butler, American jurist and politician

=== Nobility ===
- Charles Butler, 1st Earl of Arran (died 1758)
- Edmund Butler, 2nd Viscount Mountgarret (died 1602)
- Edmund Butler, 4th Viscount Mountgarret (1595–1679)
- Edmund Butler, 10th Viscount Mountgarret (died 1779)
- Edmund Butler, 11th Viscount Mountgarret (1745–1793)
- Edmund Butler, 15th Viscount Mountgarret (1875–1918)
- Edmund Butler, 1st Earl of Kilkenny (1771–1846)
- Henry Butler, 13th Viscount Mountgarret (1816–1900)
- Henry Butler, 14th Viscount Mountgarret (1844–1912)
- James Butler, 1st Earl of Ormonde (c. 1305–1337)
- James Butler, 2nd Earl of Ormonde (died 1382)
- James Butler, 3rd Earl of Ormonde (died 1405)
- James Butler, 4th Earl of Ormonde (died 1452)
- James Butler, 5th Earl of Ormonde (1421–1462)
- James Butler, 9th Earl of Ormonde (died 1546)
- James Butler, 1st Duke of Ormonde (1610–1688) created Duke in 1661
- James Butler, 2nd Duke of Ormonde (1665–1745)
- James Arthur Wellington Foley Butler, 4th Marquess of Ormonde (1849–1943)
- James Arthur Norman Butler, 6th Marquess of Ormonde (1893–1971)
- James Edward William Theobald Butler, 3rd Marquess of Ormonde (1844–1919)
- James George Anson Butler, 5th Marquess of Ormonde (1890–1949)
- James Hubert Theobald Charles Butler, 7th Marquess of Ormonde (1899–1997)
- James Wandesford Butler, 1st Marquess of Ormonde (1777–1838)
- John Butler, 6th Earl of Ormonde (died 1478)
- John Butler, 15th Earl of Ormonde (died 1766)
- John Butler, 17th Earl of Ormonde (1740–1795)
- John Butler, 2nd Marquess of Ormonde (1808–1854)
- Piers Butler, 8th Earl of Ormonde (died 1539)(also 1st Earl of Ossory)
- Piers Butler, 16th Viscount Mountgarret (1903–1966)
- Piers Butler, 18th Viscount Mountgarret (born 1961)
- Richard Butler, 1st Viscount Mountgarret (1500–1571)
- Richard Butler, 3rd Viscount Mountgarret (1578–1651)
- Richard Butler, 17th Viscount Mountgarret (1936–2004)
- Theobald Walter, 1st Baron Butler, first Chief Butler of Ireland, father of Theobald le Botiller
- Theobald Butler, 2nd Baron Butler, otherwise known as Theobald le Botiller
- Thomas Butler, 7th Earl of Ormonde (died 1515)
- Thomas Butler, 10th Earl of Ormonde (died 1614)
- Walter Butler, 11th Earl of Ormonde (died 1632)
- Walter Butler, 16th Earl of Ormonde (1703–1783)
- Walter Butler, Marquess of Ormonde (1770–1820) created Marquess of Ormonde (Ireland) in 1816

=== Sciences ===
- Amos Butler (1860–1937), American naturalist
- Anne Butler (engineer). Irish Engineer
- Arthur Gardiner Butler (1844–1925), English entomologist, arachnologist and ornithologist
- Arthur Lennox Butler (1873–1939), British naturalist
- Clifford Charles Butler, English physicist
- Edward Albert Butler (1845–1925), English entomologist
- Edward Arthur Butler (1843–1916), British ornithologist and army officer in India
- Harry Butler, Australian naturalist
- Hildred Mary Butler (1906–1975), Australian microbiologist
- John Alfred Valentine Butler, English electrochemist
- Laurie Butler (born 1955), American chemist, twin of Lynne
- Lynne Butler (born 1955), American mathematician, twin of Laurie

=== Sports ===
- Amanda Butler (born 1972), American basketball coach
- Archie Butler (footballer), Australian rules footballer
- Billy Butler, American baseball player
- Caron Butler, American basketball player
- Charlie Butler-Henderson, British motor racing driver
- Connor Butler (born 1998), English professional boxer
- Da'Sean Butler (born 1988), American basketball player
- Deighton Butler (born 1974), West Indian cricketer
- Darien Butler (born 2000), American football player
- Darius Butler (born 1986), American football player
- Dennis Butler, football manager
- Duane Butler, American football player
- Eddie Butler (baseball), American baseball player
- Eddie Butler (rugby union), Welsh rugby union player and journalist
- Hakeem Butler (born 1996), American football player
- Ian Butler (cricketer) (born 1981), New Zealand cricketer
- Ike Butler (1873–1948), American baseball player
- Jeff Butler (born 1990), American wheelchair rugby player
- Jeff Butler (football manager) (1934–2017), English football manager
- Jenna Butler (soccer) (born 2000), American professional soccer player
- Jimmy Butler, American basketball player
- Larry Butler (darts player), American darts player
- Lawrence Butler (baseball) (born 2000), American baseball player
- Lawrence Butler (basketball) (1957–2018), American basketball player
- LeRoy Butler, American football player
- Malcolm Butler (born 1990), American football player
- Malcolm Butler (Irish footballer) (1913–1987), Irish footballer
- Mario Butler (born 1957), Panamanian basketball player
- Mitchell Butler (b. 1970), American sports agent and former basketball player
- Neville Butler, (1917–1944) Australian rugby league footballer
- Percy Butler (born 2000), American football player
- Phil Butler, rugby league footballer of the 1970s, and 1980s
- Rasual Butler (1979–2018), American basketball player
- Rich Butler, Canadian baseball player
- Steve Butler, American racing driver
- Todd Butler, American college baseball coach
- Torrey Butler, American basketball player
- Vicki Butler-Henderson, British racing driver and TV presenter
- Wayde Butler, American football player

=== Other ===
- Alban Butler (1710–1773), English Catholic priest and author
- Anthea Butler (born 1950), American professor
- Christopher Butler (bishop) (1902–1986), English Catholic bishop
- W. Corly Butler (1869–1955), Methodist minister in Australia
- Lady Eileen Gwladys Butler (1891–1943), later Eileen Sutherland-Leveson-Gower, Duchess of Sutherland
- Elizabeth Beardsley Butler, American surveyor of social conditions
- Henry Montagu Butler (1833–1918), English academic
- Ignacia Bordallo Butler (died 1993), Chamorro businesswoman and entrepreneur
- Kathleen M. Butler (1891–1972), project manager for the Sydney Harbour Bridge
- Lee Pierce Butler, American academic and librarian
- Lucy Wood Butler (1820–1895), American temperance leader
- Matthew Butler, American Confederate general
- Montagu C. Butler, Esperantist, for whom the Montagu Butler Library is named
- Nicholas Murray Butler, American academic administrator and politician
- Norman 3X Butler, wrongfully convicted for the killing of Malcolm X
- Ovid Butler, American abolitionist for whom Butler University is named
- Smedley Butler, major-general, son of Thomas S. Butler
- Thaddeus J. Butler, American Catholic priest
- W. E. Butler, British occultist

== Fictional entities with the surname Butler ==
- Faykan Butler, a character from the Dune universe
- Rhett Butler, a character from Gone with the Wind
- Serena Butler, a character from the Dune universe
- Domovoi and Juliet Butler, characters from the Artemis Fowl series
- Maggie Butler, a character from John B. Keane's 1965 play The Field

== See also ==
- Justice Butler (disambiguation)
- Senator Butler (disambiguation)
- Butler (disambiguation)
- Buttler, including a list of people with this name
