= Edward Butler =

Edward or Ed Butler may refer to:

== Politicians ==
- Edward Butler (Australian politician) (1823–1879), barrister and politician in colonial New South Wales
- Edward Butler (academic) (1686–1745), English academic administrator and member of parliament
- Edward Butler (Louisiana politician), served in the Louisiana Senate
- Edward Butler (1834–1911), political boss of St. Louis and Missouri, see Bottoms Gang
- Edward Butler (New Hampshire politician) (born 1949), Democratic member of the New Hampshire House of Representatives
- Ed Butler (politician), member of the Tennessee House of Representatives

== Peers ==
- Edward Butler, 1st Viscount Galmoye (died 1653), Irish peer
- Edward Butler, 2nd Viscount Galmoye (1627–1667), Irish peer

== Military ==
- Edward Butler (soldier) (1762–1803), United States Army officer
  - Edward G. W. Butler (1800–1888), son of the above, colonel of the 3rd U. S. Dragoons in the Mexican–American War
- Sir Edward Gerald Butler (1770–1825), Irish officer in the British Army
- Ed Butler (British Army officer)

== Others ==
- Edward Butler (cricketer, born 1851) (1851–1928), Australian cricketer
- Edward Butler (cricketer, born 1883) (1883–1916), Australian cricketer
- Edward Butler (inventor) (1862–1940), British motorbike inventor
- Edward Butler (Irish judge) (died 1584), Anglo-Irish law officer and judge
- Edward Butler (Irish republican) (born 1949), former member of both the Official Irish Republican Army and the Provisional Irish Republican Army
- Edward Albert Butler (1845–1925), British entomologist
- Edward Arthur Butler (1843–1916), English ornithologist
- Edward Burgess Butler (1853–1928), American businessman
- Edward Cuthbert Butler (1858–1934), Irish ecclesiastical historian
- Edward Dundas Butler (1842–1919), linguist, translator and librarian at the British Museum
- Edward Hubert Butler Sr. (1850–1914), founder of the Buffalo Evening News in 1873
- Edward Hubert Butler Jr. (1883–1956), American publisher and editor of Buffalo Evening News
- Edward Mann Butler (1784–1855), educator in the US state of Kentucky
- Edward Montagu Butler (1866–1948), English cricketer
- Edward Scannell Butler, director of the Information Council of the Americas, see Carlos Bringuier
- Edward Butler, member of the Balcombe Street gang
- Ed Butler (baseball), American baseball shortstop
- Edward P. Butler, American polytheist philosopher

== See also ==
- Eddie Butler (disambiguation)

, British Army officer
