= Frank Butler =

Frank or Francis Butler may refer to:

== Arts and entertainment ==
- Frank Butler (musician) (1928–1984), American jazz drummer
- Frank Butler (writer) (1890–1967), American film writer
- Frank E. Butler (1850–1926), Irish-American stage performer and marksman; husband of Annie Oakley

== Sports ==
- Francis Butler (cricketer) (1856–1885), Australian cricketer
- Frank Butler (American football) (1909–1979), American football offensive lineman in the NFL
- Frank Butler (British sportswriter) (1916–2006), British sportswriter and author
- Frank Butler (cricketer) (1889–1965), Australian cricketer
- Frank Butler (jockey) (1817–1856), English jockey
- Frank Butler (outfielder) (1860–1945), American baseball player
- Frank Butler (pitcher) (1872–1899), African-American baseball pitcher and outfielder
- Frank Butler (water polo) (1932–2015), South African Olympic water polo player
- Kid Butler (outfielder) (1861–1921), American baseball player

== Others ==
- Francis Butler (dog trainer) (1810–1874), American author and veterinarian
- Frank Butler (founder) (1928–2020), American boat designer and manufacturer
- Frank Butler (politician) (1884–1961), member of the Queensland Legislative Assembly
- Francis Butler (politician) (1809–1883), member of the Maryland House of Delegates
- Frank B. Butler (1885–1973), Florida businessman and founder of a Florida beach open to Black visitors in the 1920s
- Frank Chatterton Butler (fl. 1954–1956), British ambassador to Senegal
- Frank Hedges Butler (1855–1928), British wine merchant

== See also ==
- Francis Butler Simkins (1897–1966), American historian
