= Charles Butler =

Charles or Charlie Butler may refer to:

== Legal profession ==
- Charles Butler (lawyer) (1750–1832), English lawyer and writer
- Charles Butler (NYU) (1802–1897), American lawyer and philanthropist
- Charles C. Butler (1865–1946), chief justice of the Colorado Supreme Court
- Charles Henry Butler (1859–1940), American lawyer and Reporter of Decisions for the U.S. Supreme Court
- Charles R. Butler Jr. (born 1940), U.S. federal judge

== Sportspeople ==
- Charles Butler (cricketer) (1854–1937), Tasmanian cricketer
- Charles Butler (figure skater) (born 1979), American ice dancer
- Charles Butler (umpire) (1867–?), American professional baseball umpire
- Charles Thomas Butler (born 1932), American bobsledder and Olympic medal winner
- Charlie Butler (English footballer) (1897–1963)
- Charlie Butler (Australian footballer) (1881–1945), Australian rules footballer
- Charlie Butler (baseball) (1906–1964), Major League Baseball pitcher
- Charlie Butler (basketball) (1920–2014), American basketball player

== Other ==
- Charles Butler (author) (born 1963), English academic and author of children's books
- Charles Butler (beekeeper) (1560–1647), English vicar, naturalist, philologist, musician
- Charles Butler, Earl of Arran (1671–1758), Irish nobleman
- Daws Butler (Charles Dawson Butler, 1916–1988), American voice actor
- Charles E. Butler (1908–1981), American poet
- Charles S. Butler (1870–1946), American physician and member of the New York State Assembly
- Charles Salisbury Butler (1812–1870), British member of parliament for Tower Hamlets
- Charles Butler, 7th Marquess of Ormonde (1899–1997)
- Charles Butler-Clarke-Southwell-Wandesforde (Charles Harward Butler, 1780–1860), Irish landowner, British Army officer and politician
- Chuck Butler (born 1971), American music producer, songwriter and composer

== See also ==
- Clifford Charles Butler (1922–1999), English physicist, co-discoverer of hyperons and K-mesons
- Charles Butler House (disambiguation)
