= David Butler =

David Butler or Dave Butler may refer to:

== Sports ==
- David Butler (basketball, born 1966), American basketball player who played in college for the UNLV Runnin' Rebels
- David Butler (footballer, born 1945), professional footballer in England
- David Butler (footballer, born 1953), professional footballer in England and the United States
- David Butler (footballer, born 1962), professional footballer in England
- David Butler (hurler) (born 1992), Irish hurler
- David Butler (wrestler) (born 1957), American Olympic wrestler
- Dave Butler (basketball, born 1964/1965), American basketball player who played in college for the California Golden Bears
- Dave Butler (American football) (born 1965), American football linebacker

== Entertainment ==
- David Butler (author) (born 1964), Irish author, playwright and poet
- David Butler (director) (1894–1979), American filmmaker, screenwriter and actor
- David Butler (screenwriter) (1927–2006), British writer of screenplays and teleplays
- David John Butler, who writes under D. J. Butler and Dave Butler, American writer

== Other ==
- David Butler (general) (1928–2020), Australian Army officer
- David Butler (politician) (1829–1891), American politician, governor of the state of Nebraska
- Sir David Butler (psephologist) (1924–2022), British social scientist and psephologist
- David Butler (sculptor) (1898–1997), American sculptor and painter

== See also ==
- David Butler-Jones, Canadian physician and Canada's first (2004) Chief Public Health Officer
- Alan David Butler (1927–1972), Rhodesian sailor, businessman and politician
- David W. Butler High School, American school
- Butler (surname)
