= Thomas A. Butler =

Thomas A. Butler may refer to:

- Thomas Adair Butler (1836–1901), English recipient of the Victoria Cross
- Thomas Ambrose Butler (1837–1897), Irish-American priest and author

== See also ==
- Thomas Butler (disambiguation)
