= Lee Butler =

Lee Butler may refer to:

- Lee Butler (footballer) (born 1966), English footballer
- Lee Pierce Butler (1884–1953), librarian at the University of Chicago
- George Lee Butler (born 1939), American military officer, last commander of Strategic Air Command
