= Albert Butler (disambiguation) =

Albert Butler (born 1947) is an American politician in Mississippi.

Albert Butler may also refer to:

- A. T. Butler (1872–1952), English architect
- Ben Butler (footballer) (Albert Victor Butler, died 1916), footballer for Reading and Queens Park Rangers
- Albert Butler (Baptist minister) (1887–1947), in Australia

== See also ==
- Bert Butler (disambiguation)
