= Dan Kotowski =

American politician (born 1967)

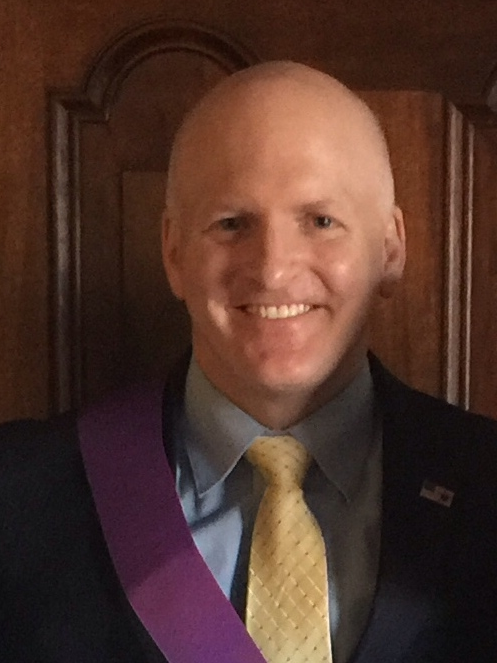

Member of the Illinois Senate from the 28th District 33rd District (2007-2013)
- In office January 2007 – October 2015
- Preceded by: Cheryl Axley
- Succeeded by: Laura Murphy

Personal details
- Born: March 24, 1967 (age 59)
- Party: Democratic
- Education: University of Illinois Urbana-Champaign
- Profession: Lobbyist

Dan Kotowski (born March 24, 1967) was the Illinois State Senator from the 28th district. The 28th district includes all or parts of Arlington Heights, Bartlett, Bloomingdale, Des Plaines, Elk Grove Village, Hanover Park, Hoffman Estates, Park Ridge, Roselle and Schaumburg. He previously represented the 33rd district from 2007 to 2013 before the 2011 redistricting.

== Early life and career ==
Dan Kotowski attended Loyola Academy and University of Illinois Urbana-Champaign, earning a degree in communications in 1989, and DePaul University, earning a master's degree in Fine Arts in 2004. He then served as executive director of the gun violence prevention organization "Illinois Council Against Handgun Violence" and as a vice president at the Uhlich Children's Advantage Network.

== Political career ==
Senator Kotowski was first sworn into office in 2007. He served as the Chairperson of Appropriations II, Vice Chairperson of Appropriations I and the Sub-Chairperson on both Property Taxes and CLEAR Compliance. His other committee assignments were Criminal Law, Higher Education, Revenue, and the Subcommittee on Tax Credits. In 2011, his expertise and success on budgeting matters had him made chairman of the bipartisan Budgeting for Results commission.

=== Electoral history ===
==== 2012 Senate Election ====
After the 2011 redistricting, Senator Kotowski chose to run in the newly drawn 28th district which includes his home, much of the old 33rd district and added Bartlett, Bloomingdale, Hanover Park, Roselle and Schaumburg. In the election he faced Republican businessman Jim O'Donnell.

2012 General Election Results- Illinois's 28th Senate District
Party	Candidate	Votes	%
Democratic	Dan Kotowski	45,656	57.3
Republican	Jim O'Donnell	34,035	42.7
Total votes		79,691	100

==== 2008 Senate Election ====
2008 General Election Results- Illinois's 33rd Senate District
Party	Candidate	Votes	%
Democratic	Dan Kotowski	48,344	59.9
Republican	Mike Sweeney	32,293	40.0
Total votes		80,637	100

==== 2006 Senate Election ====
In 2006, Dan Kotowski ran for the Senate seat being vacated by the retiring Dave Sullivan.

2006 General Election Results – Illinois’s 33rd Senate District
Party	Candidate	Votes	%
Democratic	Dan Kotowski	29,293	51.3
Republican	Cheryl Axley	27,859	48.7
Democratic gain from Republican			

== Post-legislative career ==
Kotowski resigned his Senate position in 2015 to become CEO of Chicago-based healthcare advocacy/lobbying organization ChildServ to "take care of [his] family better." In 2018, Gov. J. B. Pritzker appointed Kotowski a member of the gubernatorial transition's Healthy Children and Families Committee.
