= Anne Butler =

Ann(e) Butler may refer to:

- Ann Butler (painter) (1813–1887), American painter
- Anne Butler, Countess of Ormond (c. 1360–1397)
- Annie Butler, English supercentenarian
- Ann Butler, camogie player, see All-Ireland Senior Club Camogie Championship 1980
- Anne Butler (engineer), Irish engineer
