= Reginald Butler =

Reginald Butler may refer to:

- Sir Reginald Butler, 1st Baronet (1866–1933), English businessman.
- Sir Thomas Butler, 2nd Baronet (1901–1959), his son, whose actual first name was also Reginald
- Sir Michael Butler, 3rd Baronet (1928–2012), his grandson, whose actual first name was also Reginald
- Sir Richard Michael Butler, 4th Baronet (born 1953), his great-grandson, whose actual first name is also Reginald
- Reg Butler (1913–1981), English sculptor

== See also ==
- Butler (surname)
