= Archie Butler =

Archie Butler may refer to:

- Archie Butler (footballer)
- Archie Butler (actor)
