= Fred Butler =

Fred Butler may refer to:

- Fred Butler (cricketer) (1857–1923), English first-class cricketer
- Fred M. Butler (1854–1932), Vermont attorney and judge

== See also ==
- Frederic B. Butler (1896–1987), U.S. Army officer
- Sir Frederick Butler (1873–1961), British civil servant
