= Herbert Butler =

Herbert Butler may refer to:

- Herbert Butler (politician) (1897–1971), British politician
- Herbert Butler (footballer) (1906–?), English footballer
- Bert Butler (footballer, born 1915) (1915–1999), Australian rules footballer
- Dick Butler (footballer) (Herbert Butler, 1911–1984), English footballer

== See also ==
- Bert Butler (disambiguation)
