= Bordallo (surname) =

Bordallo is a surname. Notable people with the surname include:

- Ignacia Bordallo Butler (d. 1993), businesswoman
- Madeleine Bordallo (born 1933), Guamanian politician
- Ricardo Bordallo (1927–1990), Guamanian politician and businessman
