= P. N. Furbank =

English writer (1920–2014)

Philip Nicholas Furbank FRSL (/ˈfɜːrˌbæŋk/; 23 May 1920 – 27 June 2014) was an English biographer, critic and academic. He was educated at Emmanuel College, Cambridge, where he later taught. He worked in London as an editor and librarian before becoming a professor at the Open University. At Cambridge he became a close friend of the novelist E. M. Forster and the mathematician Alan Turing, whose literary executor he became.

Furbank is best known for E. M. Forster: A Life. Forster himself chose Furbank to write it, and it came to be regarded as one of the leading literary biographies of the 20th century. With W. R. Owens he spent some twenty years working on Daniel Defoe, and served as general editor of a 44-volume edition of Defoe’s works. His other books include studies of Samuel Butler and Italo Svevo, and Diderot: A Critical Biography (1992), which received the first Truman Capote Award for Literary Criticism.

== Career ==
Furbank, who was known throughout his life as Nick, was born in Cranleigh, Surrey, on 23 May 1920. His father was a bank manager. After attending Reigate Grammar School, he entered Emmanuel College, Cambridge, graduating with a First in English. He then served in the army, becoming a corporal in the Royal Electrical and Mechanical Engineers, and was in Italy in 1945. He returned to Emmanuel as a teaching Fellow in 1947. While in Cambridge Furbank became a close friend of the novelist E. M. Forster, and also of the mathematician Alan Turing, whose literary executor he became.

Furbank had a lifelong stammer, which led him to give up university teaching at Cambridge. In 1953 Furbank moved to London, where he worked as an editor and a librarian, and contributed book reviews to The Listener. In 1960 he married the poet and critic Patricia Beer. The marriage was dissolved by 1964, when she remarried. In 1972 Furbank became a professor of the Open University.

== Works ==
=== The Forster biography and its reception ===
Furbank's best known work is E. M. Forster: A Life. Forster had recognized that a biography was inevitable and originally asked the novelist William Plomer to write one. By the late 1960s, however, Forster had become concerned that Plomer would not treat his sexual orientation with the openness he wanted, and Plomer himself found the subject impossible to describe, so Forster asked Furbank to take over. Furbank began work in 1969. Forster's old college, King's College, made Furbank a fellow for the two years before Forster's death in 1970 to support the writing, and the biography was published in two volumes in 1977 and 1978.

The biography was widely regarded as one of the leading literary biographies of the 20th century. Michiko Kakutani , writing in The New York Times Book Review in 1984, called it "a superb model of biographical art", particularly for its characterization of Forster's inner life.

Forster scholar Frederick P. W. McDowell, reviewing the first volume, called it the official and definitive biography within the limits its author had set, noting its use of unpublished material held at King's College. Reviewing the second volume, McDowell said that it was valuable because it filled in gaps in what was known of Forster's life, especially the public roles he played in the 1930s and during the Second World War.

V. S. Pritchett wrote in The New York Review of Books that the biography showed the man himself.

=== Other works ===
Furbank's first book was a study of the novelist Samuel Butler. His Italo Svevo: The Man and the Writer (1966) was described by the critic John Simon in The New York Times Book Review as "very nearly perfect". His Diderot: A Critical Biography (1992) received the first Truman Capote Award for Literary Criticism, awarded by the University of Iowa in 1995.

Furbank began working on Daniel Defoe in the early 1980s, along with scholar W.R. Owens. They published four books on Defoe over the next twenty years. These included A Critical Bibliography of Daniel Defoe, The Canonisation of Daniel Defoe and A Political Biography of Daniel Defoe. Furbank and Owens were also the general editors of a 44-volume edition of Defoe's works.

Furbank also helped to oversee the publication of Alan Turing's collected works.

Furbank edited editions of Fielding's Joseph Andrews, Dickens's Martin Chuzzlewit and Hardy's Tess of the d'Urbervilles. He published essays on G. K. Chesterton, D. H. Lawrence, Henry James and Elizabeth Gaskell. He wrote studies of the poet Mallarmé and the painter Poussin, and Behalf (1999), a book on political thought.
