= Bert Butler =

Bert Butler may refer to:

- Bert Butler (footballer, born 1889) (1889–1953), Australian rules footballer for St Kilda
- Bert Butler (footballer, born 1915) (1915–1999), Australian rules footballer for Carlton
- Bert Butler, founder of Tito's Vodka

== See also ==
- Albert Butler (disambiguation)
- Robert Butler (disambiguation)
- Herbert Butler (disambiguation)
- Hubert Butler, Irish writer
