= Beidler =

Beidler is a surname. Notable people with the surname include:

- Francis Beidler (1854–1924), Chicago-based lumberman
- Isolde Beidler (1865–1919), first child of the composer Richard Wagner
- Jacob A. Beidler (1852–1912), American politician
- Joe Beidler (1918–2016), American baseball player
- John X. Beidler, or simply "X. Beidler", associated with the Montana Vigilantes
- Philip Beidler (1944–2022), American professor of American literature, author, and editor
