= Greenbush, Rensselaer County, New York =

Former American town

The Town of Greenbush is a former town in the state of New York. At first The Town of Greenbush was part of Albany County, then in 1791 became part of Rensselaer County, when Rensselaer County was created in 1791.

The current towns of East Greenbush and North Greenbush were parts of the former Town of Greenbush.

The Town of Greenbush, also included the Village of Greenbush which was incorporated in 1815, and also included the hamlets of Bath and East Albany.

The Village of Greenbush, including Fort Crailo, was changed to the City of Rensselaer in 1897 by the New York State Legislature, and the Village of Greenbush and the Town of Greenbush ceased to exist.

== Notable people ==
- Lucy Wood Butler (1820–1895), temperance leader
- Edmonia Lewis (1844–1907), sculptor
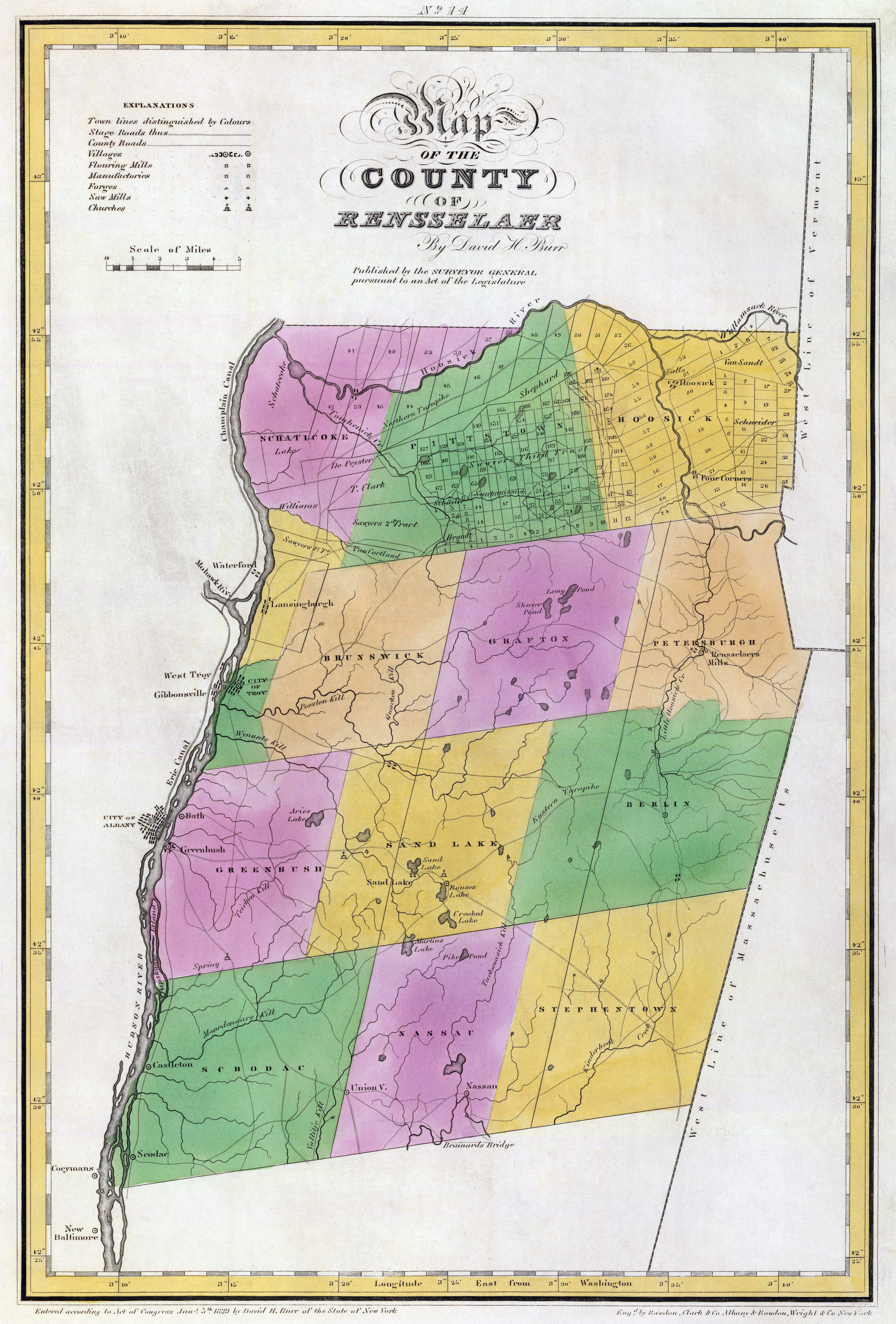
Map of Rensselaer County from 1829, showing the former Town of Greenbush. Note Village of Greenbush.

Rensselaer County today (2020)
