= Senator Butler =

Senator Butler may refer to:

== Members of the United States Senate ==
- Andrew Butler (1796–1857), U.S. Senator from South Carolina from 1846 to 1857
- Hugh A. Butler (1878–1954), U.S. Senator from Nebraska from 1941 to 1954
- John Marshall Butler (1897–1978), U.S. Senator from Maryland from 1951 to 1963
- Laphonza Butler (born 1978), U.S. Senator from California from 2023 to 2024
- Marion Butler (1863–1938), U.S. Senator from North Carolina from 1895 to 1901
- Matthew Butler (1836–1909), U.S. Senator from South Carolina from 1877 to 1895
- Pierce Butler (American politician) (1744–1822), U.S. Senator from South Carolina from 1789 to 1796
- William M. Butler (1861–1937), U.S. Senator from Massachusetts from 1924 to 1926; also served in the Massachusetts State Senate

== United States state senate members ==
- Albert Butler (born 1947), Mississippi State Senator
- Benjamin Butler (1818–1893), Massachusetts State Senate
- David Butler (politician) (1829–1891), Nebraska State Senate
- Fred M. Butler (1854–1932), Vermont State Senate
- Gloria S. Butler (born 1941), Georgia State Senate
- Homer M. Butler (1904–1982), Illinois State Senate
- Kelvin Butler (born 1956), Mississippi State Senate
- Marty Butler (1924–1998), Illinois State Senate
- Robert R. Butler (1881–1933), Oregon State Senate
- Roderick R. Butler (1827–1902), Tennessee State Senate
- Thomas B. Butler (1806–1873), Connecticut State Senate
- Thomas H. Butler (1819–1889), Tennessee State Senate
- Tom Butler (Alabama politician) (born 1944), Alabama State Senate
- Walker Butler (1898–1969), Illinois State Senate
