= James Butler =

James, Jim, or Jimmy Butler may refer to:

== Irish noblemen ==
- James Butler, 1st Earl of Ormond (c. 1305–1338)
- James Butler, 2nd Earl of Ormond (1331–1382)
- James Butler, 3rd Earl of Ormond (c. 1359–1405)
- James "Gallda" Butler (died 1434), a son of the 3rd Earl of Ormond; half-brother to the 4th Earl of Ormond
- James Butler, 4th Earl of Ormond (1392–1452)
- James Butler, 5th Earl of Ormond (1420–1461)
- Sir James Butler of Polestown (died 1487), warlord in Yorkist Ireland
- James Butler, 9th Earl of Ormond (1496–1546)
- James Butler of Duiske (fl. 1540–1576)
- James Butler, 1st Duke of Ormond (1610–1688), Anglo-Irish statesman and soldier
- James Butler, 2nd Duke of Ormonde (1665–1745), Irish statesman and soldier
- James Butler (military adventurer) (fl. 1631–1634), Irish military adventurer
- James Butler, 1st Marquess of Ormonde (1777–1838)
- James Butler, 3rd Marquess of Ormonde (1844–1919), Irish nobleman
- James Butler, 4th Marquess of Ormonde (1849–1943)
- James Butler, 5th Marquess of Ormonde (1890–1949)
- James Butler, 6th Marquess of Ormonde (1893–1971), British peer
- James Butler, 7th Marquess of Ormonde (1899–1997)

== Politics ==
=== U.S. politics ===
- James Joseph Butler (1862–1917), U.S. Representative from Missouri
- James Butler Hare (1918–1966), American politician
- Jim Butler, founder of Tonopah, Nevada
- Jim Butler (Ohio politician) (born 1969), member of the Ohio House of Representatives
- Jim Butler (West Virginia politician) (born 1965), member of the West Virginia House of Delegates

=== Other politics ===
- James Butler (1651–1696), Member of Parliament for Arundel
- James Butler (1680–1741), Member of Parliament for Arundel and Sussex
- Sir J. R. M. Butler (James Ramsay Montagu Butler, 1889–1975), British politician and academic

== Sports ==
- James Butler (American football) (born 1982), American football safety
- James Butler (boxer) (born 1972), American boxer
- James Butler (Canadian football) (born 1995), Canadian football running back
- James Butler (sprinter) (born 1960), American track sprinter
- James Caron Butler (born 1980), American basketball player
- Jim Butler (American football) (1943–2014), American football running back
- Jim Butler (table tennis) (born 1971), American table tennis player
- Jimmy Butler (born 1989), American basketball player

== Others ==
- James Butler (artist) (1931–2022), British sculptor
- James Butler (Bible scholar), Australian founder of Adelaide Bible Institute
- James Butler (British Army officer) (died 1836)
- James Butler (grocer) (1855–1934), American businessman
- James Butler (Irish Brigade officer) (died 1770), officer in the Irish Brigade in France
- James Bayley Butler (1884–1964), Irish biologist and academic
- James Edward Butler (1843–1913), Justice of the peace, planter, and merchant in Alabama
- James G. Butler (1920–2005), American trial lawyer
- Jim Butler (game designer), American role-playing game designer
- Jimmy Butler (actor) (1921–1945), American actor
