= Daniel Butler =

Daniel Butler may refer to:

- Daniel Allen Butler (born 1957), American author, historian and playwright
- Dan Butler (born 1954), American actor
- Dan Butler (baseball) (born 1986), American professional baseball catcher
- Dan Butler (civil servant), American civil servant
- Daniel Butler (cyclist) (1944–1970), American Olympic cyclist
- Dan Butler (footballer, born 1994), English footballer
- Dan Butler (Australian footballer) (born 1996), Australian rules football player
- Daniel Butler (minister) (1808–1893), American minister
- Dan B. Butler (1879–?), American football coach and mayor of Omaha, Nebraska
- Daniel Butler, host of television show America's Dumbest Criminals
- Daniel N. Butler, American film editor
