= Buttler =

Buttler is a surname. Notable people with the surname include:

- Jos Buttler (born 1990), English cricketer
- Ljiljana Buttler (1944–2010), Yugoslav-Romani folk singer

== See also ==
- Butler (surname)
- Buttlar family, Upper Franconian-Hessian noble family
