= George Butler =

George Butler may refer to:

== Arts and entertainment ==
- George Butler (filmmaker) (1944–2021), American filmmaker
- George Butler (record producer) (1931–2008), American record producer
- George Bernard Butler (1838–1907), American painter
- George Edmund Butler (1872–1936), English landscape and portrait painter
- George "Wild Child" Butler (1936–2005), American blues musician
- George Butler (artist) (born 1985), British artist and reportage illustrator

== Education ==
- George Butler (1819–1890), English divine and schoolmaster
- George Butler (headmaster) (1774–1853), his father, English schoolmaster and churchman

== Law and politics ==
- George Edwin Butler (1868–1941), American lawyer and author
- George Howland Butler (1894–1967), United States ambassador to the Dominican Republic
- George Slade Butler (1821–1882), English lawyer and antiquary
- Sir Geoffrey G. Butler (George Geoffrey Gilbert Butler, 1887–1929), British member of parliament for Cambridge University, 1923–1929
- George William Butler, state legislator in Mississippi

== Military ==
- George D. Butler (1813–1836), Alamo defender
- George Harris Butler (1840–1886), U.S. Army officer and U.S. counsel general to Egypt
- George Lee Butler (born 1939), United States Air Force officer

== Sports ==
- George Butler (cricketer, born 1810) (1810–1887), English cricketer
- George Butler (cricketer, born 1900) (1900–1969), English cricketer

== Other ==
- George Butler, 5th Marquess of Ormonde (1890–1949)
- George Butler (bishop), bishop of Limerick
- George Henry Butler, American businessman
- George Ide Butler (1834–1918), Seventh-day Adventist leader
