= Paul Butler =

Paul Butler may refer to:

== Law and politics ==
- Paul Dalrymple Butler (1886–1955), British diplomat
- Paul Butler (lawyer) (1905–1961), American lawyer
- Paul Butler (politician) (1956/1957–2026), Northern Irish politician
- Paul Butler (professor) (born 1961), American law professor

== Sports ==
=== Association football (soccer) ===
- Paul Butler (footballer, born 1964), English football (soccer) player
- Paul Butler (footballer, born 1972), English-born football (soccer) player in Ireland
- Paul Butler (football coach) (born 1985/1986), English football coach

=== Other sports ===
- Paul Butler (polo) (1892–1981), American polo player
- Paul Butler (cricketer) (born 1963), English cricketer
- Paul Butler (boxer) (born 1988), English boxer

== Others ==
- Paul Butler (bishop) (born 1955), British Anglican bishop
- R. Paul Butler (born 1960), American astronomer
- Paul Butler (artist) (born 1973), Canadian artist
