= Robert Butler =

Bob, Bobby, Rob, or Robert Butler may refer to:

== Politicians ==
- Robert Butler (diplomat) (1897–1955), U.S. ambassador to Australia (1946–48) and Cuba (1948–1951)
- Robert Butler (MP), 16th-century member of parliament for Bristol
- Robert Butler (U.S. commander) (1786–1860), U.S. commander receiving the former East Florida for the United States in 1821, from Spain
- Robert Butler (Virginia politician) (1784–1853), American, treasurer of the state of Virginia, U.S.
- Cuthbert Butler (politician) (Robert John Cuthbert Butler, 1889–1950), member of the Legislative Assembly of Queensland, Australia
- Robert L. Butler (1927–2019), American politician, twelve-term mayor of Marion, Illinois, U.S.
- Robert R. Butler (1881–1933), American politician, judge, and representative from Oregon, U.S.
- Rob Butler (politician) (born 1967), Conservative British MP for Aylesbury from 2019 to 2024
- Robbie Butler (born 1972), Northern Irish unionist politician
- Robert P. Butler (1883–1971), United States attorney for the District of Connecticut

== Sports ==
- Robert Butler (cricketer) (1852–1916), English cricketer
- Bob Butler (1891–1959), American football player, best known for playing college football for Wisconsin
- Bobby Butler (American football) (born 1959), American football player, best known for playing in the NFL for the Atlanta Falcons
- Bobby Butler (ice hockey) (born 1987), American ice hockey player
- Rob Butler (baseball) (born 1970), Canadian baseball player
- Rob Butler (rugby league) (born 1998), English rugby league footballer

== Others ==
- Robert Butler (artist) (1943–2014), one of the Florida Highwaymen
- Robert Butler (criminal) (1851–1905), New Zealand and Australian murderer and career criminal
- Robert Butler (director) (1927–2023), American film and television director
- Robert Butler (obesity) (1972–2015), one of the world's heaviest people
- Robert N. Butler (1927–2010), American physician and the first director of the United States' National Institute on Aging
- Robert Olen Butler (born 1945), American writer
- Sir Reginald Butler, 1st Baronet (Robert Reginald Frederick Butler, 1866–1933), English businessman
- Robert Butler Jr. (1994–2011), perpetrator of the Millard South High School shooting

== See also ==
- Bert Butler (disambiguation)
