= Lady Eleanor Butler =

Lady Eleanor Butler may refer to:

- Lady Eleanor (Charlotte) Butler (1739–1829), Irish noblewoman, one of the Ladies of Llangollen
- Eleanor Howard, Countess of Wicklow, (1915–1997), Irish architect and politician
- Lady Eleanor Talbot (died 1468), whose married name was Butler, alleged wife of King Edward IV of England
- Eleanor Beaufort (1431–1501), daughter of Edmund Beaufort and Eleanor Beauchamp
- Eleanor Butler, Countess of Desmond, (c. 1545 – c.1636), Irish countess and politician

== See also ==
- Lady Butler (disambiguation)
- Eleanor Butler
