= Cheryl Axley =

American politician and attorney

Member of the Illinois Senate from the 33rd district
- In office September 17, 2005 – January 2007
- Preceded by: Dave Sullivan
- Succeeded by: Dan Kotowski

Personal details
- Party: Republican
- Profession: Attorney

Cheryl Axley is an attorney and former Illinois State Senator.

From Elk Grove Township, Cook County, Illinois, Axley received her bachelor's degree in 1981 from University of Illinois at Urbana–Champaign. She received her Juris Doctor degree from John Marshall Law School in 1984 and was admitted to the Illinois bar the same year.

Axley was involved with the Republican Party in Elk Grove Township, where she served as township clerk. In September 2005, Axley was appointed to the Illinois Senate for the 33rd District, replacing Dave Sullivan who had resigned to become a lobbyist. She served in the 94th Illinois General Assembly.

Axley ran for re-election in the 2006 election but was defeated by Democrat Dan Kotowski.
