= Sarah Butler =

Sarah Butler may refer to:

- Sarah Butler (actress), American screen actress
- Sarah Hildreth Butler, American stage actress
- Sarah Poage Caldwell Butler, American librarian
- Sarah Zeid (born Sarah Antonia Butler), Jordanian-American humanitarian

== See also ==
- Sara Butler, American Catholic theologian
