= Richard Butler =

Richard Butler may refer to:

== Military ==
- Richard Butler, 1st Earl of Arran (1639–1686), 1st Earl of Arran, marshal of the army in Ireland, lord deputy of Ireland
- Richard Butler (general) (1743–1791), American Revolutionary War general, later killed fighting Native Americans in Ohio
- Richard Butler (British Army officer) (1870–1935), British Army general, served in World War I
- Richard W. Butler, U.S. Navy aviator and officer

== Politicians ==
- Richard Butler (c. 1510 – 1568 or later), member of parliament (MP)
- Sir Richard Butler, 5th Baronet (1699–1771), Irish MP for Carlow County 1730–1761
- Richard Butler (Australian politician) (1850–1925), premier of South Australia
- Sir Richard Butler, 7th Baronet (1761–1817), Irish and British MP for Carlow County 1783–1790 and 1796–1802
- Richard Layton Butler (1885–1966), Australian politician, premier of South Australia
- Richard A. Butler (Irish politician), Irish independent senator
- Rab Butler (Richard Austen Butler, 1902–1982), British politician and Chancellor of the Exchequer
- Richard Butler, 1st Earl of Glengall (1775–1819), Irish peer
- Richard Butler, 2nd Earl of Glengall (1794–1858), Irish politician and peer
- Richard Butler (diplomat) (born 1942), Australian diplomat, arms inspector, and former governor of Tasmania

== Musicians ==
- Richard Butler (singer) (born 1956), lead singer of the Psychedelic Furs and former lead singer of Love Spit Love
  - Richard Butler (album), the singer's self-titled album released in 2006
- Richard Preston Butler Jr., real name of rapper/songwriter Rico Love

== Others ==
- Richard Butler, 1st Viscount Mountgarret (1500–1571)
- Richard Butler, 3rd Viscount Mountgarret (1578–1651)
- Richard Butler, 17th Viscount Mountgarret (1936–2004), British soldier
- Richard Butler (author) (1844–1928), British dramatist
- Richard Butler (Irish priest), 19th-century Irish Anglican priest
- Richard Butler (English priest) (died 1612), English priest
- Richard Butler (publisher) (1834–1925), Canadian publisher
- Richard Butler (white supremacist) (1918–2004), American founder of Aryan Nations
- Richard C. Butler (1929–2012), British farmer and banker, president of the National Farmers' Union
- Richard E. Butler, general secretary of the International Telecommunication Union, 1983–89, Australian federal public servant
- Richard Butler (academic), human geographer and academic
- Richard Butler, American businessman and eponym of Butler, New Jersey
- Rich Butler (born 1973), baseball player
- Richard J. Butler, palaeontologist
