= Gerald Butler =

Gerald Butler may refer to:

- Gerald Butler (American football) (born 1954), American football wide receiver
- Gerald Butler (judge) (1930–2010), English judge
- Gerald Butler (writer) (1907–1988), English writer and screenwriter

== See also ==
- Gerard Butler (born 1969), Scottish actor
- Jerry Butler (disambiguation)
