= Bouthillier =

Bouthillier is a surname, and may refer to:

- Armand Jean le Bouthillier de Rancé (1626–1700), French Trappist monk
- Claude Bouthillier (1581–1652), French statesman and diplomat
- Flavien-Guillaume Bouthillier (1844–1907), Quebec lawyer and politician
- Guy Bouthillier (born 1939), Canadian academic
- John Le Bouthillier (1797–1872), Quebec businessman
- Léon Bouthillier, comte de Chavigny (1844–1907), French statesman
- Louis-Tancrède Bouthillier (1796–1881), Canadian merchant
- Marie-Claude Bouthillier (born 1960), Canadian artist
- Victor Le Bouthillier (1590–1670), French politician and clergyman
- Wilfred Le Bouthillier (born 1978), Canadian singer
- Yves Bouthillier (1901–1977), French politician
