= Eddie Butler =

Eddie Butler may refer to:

- Eddie Butler (baseball) (born 1991), baseball pitcher
- Eddie Butler (rugby union) (1957–2022), Welsh rugby union player, journalist, sports commentator
- Eddie Butler (singer) (born 1971), Israeli singer
- Eddie Butler, participant in the Balcombe Street Siege
- Eddy Butler (born 1962), former elections officer of the British National Party

== See also ==
- Edward Butler (disambiguation)
