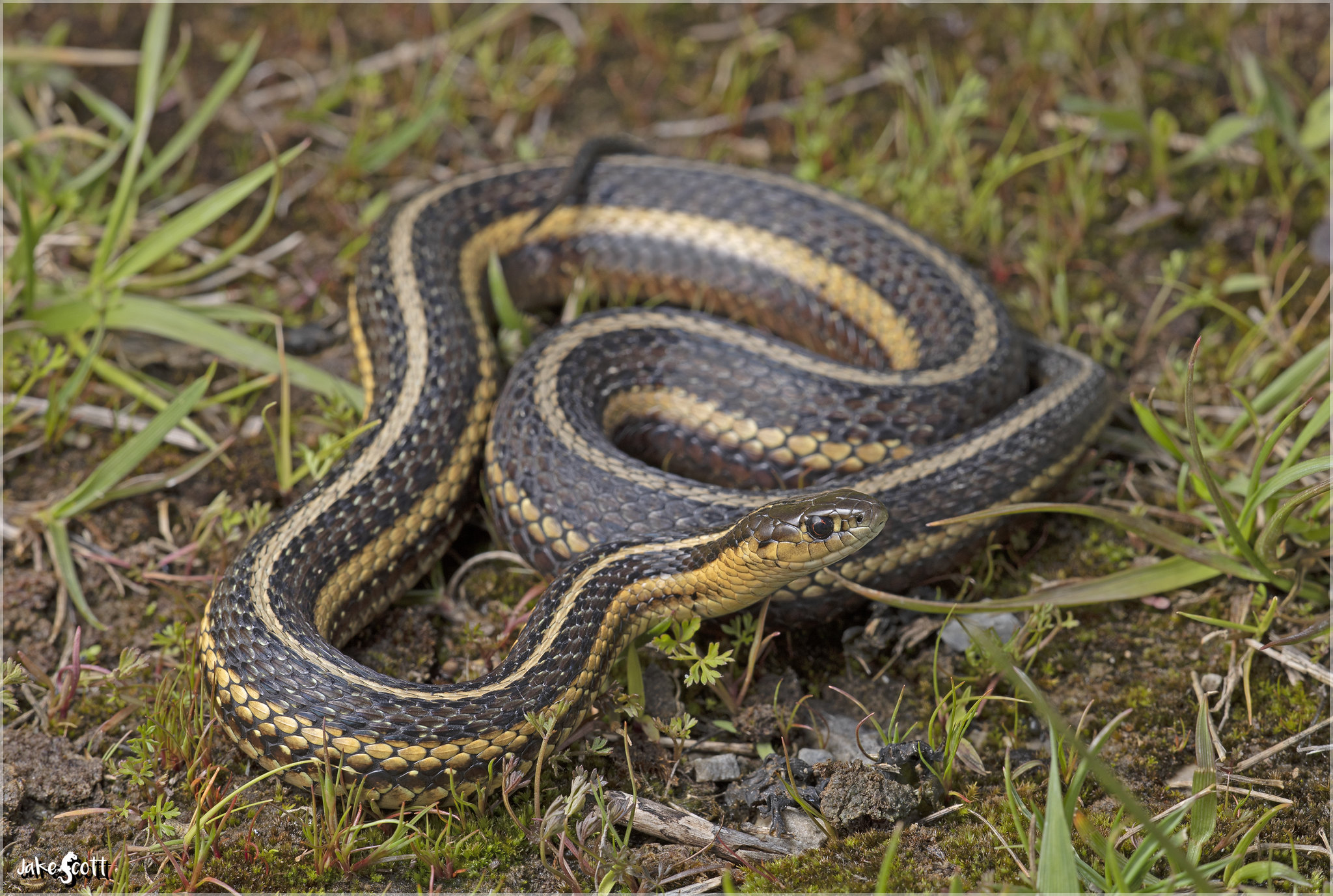
- Butler's garter snake

Conservation status
- Least Concern (IUCN 3.1)

Scientific classification
- Kingdom: Animalia
- Phylum: Chordata
- Class: Reptilia
- Order: Squamata
- Suborder: Serpentes
- Family: Colubridae
- Genus: Thamnophis
- Species: T. butleri

Binomial name
- Thamnophis butleri (Cope, 1889)

Synonyms
- Eutænia butleri Cope, 1889; Tropidonotus ordinatus Var. butleri — Boulenger, 1893; Thamnophis butleri — Stejneger, 1895; Tropidonotus butleri — Boulenger, 1896; Eutaenia butlerii — Cope, 1900; Thamnophis butleri — Stejneger & Barbour, 1917; Thamnophis butleri — Schmidt & Davis, 1941; Thamnophis radix butleri — Wright & Wright, 1957; Thamnophis butleri — Conant, 1975

= Butler's garter snake =

Species of snake

Butler's garter snake (Thamnophis butleri) is a species of snake in the subfamily Natricinae of the family Colubridae. The species is endemic to North America.

== Etymology ==
The specific name butleri is in honor of ornithologist Amos Butler (1860–1937) of Brookville, Indiana.

== Geographic range ==
Thamnophis butleri is found in northwestern Ohio, northeastern Indiana, the eastern portion of the Lower Peninsula of Michigan, and the adjacent extreme southern tip of Ontario, Canada. Also, a disjunct population is found in southeastern Wisconsin.

== Description and identification ==
Thamnophis butleri is a small, slender snake, averaging 38–51 cm (15–20 in) in total length (tail included), with three yellow to orange stripes along the length of its body. The background color can range from olive-brown to black, and it may also be possible to discern two rows of dark spots between the side and back stripes. These features do little to distinguish it from most other garter snakes species, but the placement of the lateral, or side, stripes is unique to this species. In Butler's garter snake the lateral stripes are centered on the third scale row up from the ventral scales, and they also overlap the adjacent second and fourth scale rows. This contrasts with the lateral stripe placement of other garter snake species.

For those hoping to avoid getting close enough to inspect the position of the lateral stripe, other features may help in their identification. The head is unusually small for a garter snake, and, when excited, the effort this snake expends to escape seems to go more towards thrashing in place than to getting away.

== Ecology ==
Butler's garter snake inhabits moist, grassy, open canopy areas, such as meadows, wet prairies, marshes, savannas, and grasslands. Like Kirtland's snake, it may also be found in grassy vacant lots in suburban and residential areas. The species can often be found under rocks, logs, trash, and boards. It subsists on a diet of mainly earthworms, but it may also eat leeches, salamanders, and frogs. The species hibernates communally, often with other garter snake species. Butler's garter snake is a relatively short-lived species, and it reaches sexual maturity in its second spring.

== Reproduction ==
Thamnophis butleri is ovoviviparous. Mating takes place in late March and early April. The young are born in June or July, in broods of four to 14. The newborns are 13–18 cm (5.1–7.1 in) long.

== Conservation status ==
In Indiana, Butler's garter snake is listed as an endangered species. In Ontario, the species is also listed as endangered. In Wisconsin, Butler's garter snake is listed as a species of special concern.
