= Robert Butler (cricketer) =

English cricketer

Personal information
- Full name: Robert Butler
- Born: 8 March 1852; Radcliffe-on-Trent, Nottinghamshire, England
- Died: 18 December 1916 (aged 64); Sutton-cum-Granby, Nottinghamshire, England
- Batting: Right-handed
- Role: Occasional wicket-keeper
- Relatives: Fred Butler (brother); George Parr (uncle)

Domestic team information
- Years: Team
- 1870–1877: Nottinghamshire

Career statistics
Competition	First-class
Matches	10
Runs scored	163
Batting average	10.18
100s/50s	–/1
Top score	60
Balls bowled	–
Wickets	–
Bowling average	–
5 wickets in innings	–
10 wickets in match	–
Best bowling	–
Catches/stumpings	8/1
- Source: Cricinfo, 27 May 2012

Robert Butler (8 March 1852 – 18 December 1916) was an English cricketer. Butler was a right-handed batsman who occasionally fielded as a wicket-keeper. He was born at Radcliffe-on-Trent, Nottinghamshire.

Butler made his first-class debut for Nottinghamshire against Kent at Crystal Palace Park in 1870. He made would go on to make a further six first-class appearances for the county, the last of which came against Lancashire at Old Trafford in 1877. In his seven first-class appearances for Nottinghamshire, he scored 120 runs at an average of 10.00, with a high score of 60. This score was his only half century and came against Kent on debut. He also made two first-class appearances in the North v South fixture, for the North in 1872 and the South in 1876. He also made a single first-class appearance for a United North of England Eleven against a United South of England Eleven in 1876 at Argyle Street, Hull.

He died at Sutton-cum-Granby, Nottinghamshire, on 18 December 1916. His brother, Fred, and uncle, George Parr, both played first-class cricket.
