= Pierce Butler =

Pierce or Piers Butler may refer to:

- Piers Butler, 8th Earl of Ormond (c. 1467 – 26 August 1539), Anglo-Irish nobleman in the Peerage of Ireland
- Piers Butler, 3rd Viscount Galmoye (1652–1740), Anglo-Irish nobleman in the Peerage of Ireland
- Pierce Butler, 4th Viscount Ikerrin (c. 1677–1711), Irish peer, politician and soldier
- Sir Pierce Butler, 4th Baronet (1670–1732), Irish Member of Parliament in the Irish House of Commons for Carlow County
- Pierce Butler (American politician) (1744–1822), U.S. Senator and Founding Father from South Carolina
- Pierce Butler (Kilkenny MP, born 1774) (1774–1846), Irish Member of Parliament in the United Kingdom House of Commons for Kilkenny
- Pierce Mason Butler (1798–1847), American soldier and politician, Governor of South Carolina
- Pierce Mease Butler (died 1867), American plantation owner, husband of actress Fanny Kemble, and proprietor of the Great Slave Auction, grandson of the senator
- Pierce Somerset Butler (1801–1865), Irish Member of Parliament in the United Kingdom House of Commons for Kilkenny, son of the previous MP
- Pierce Butler (judge) (1866–1939), U.S. Supreme Court Justice
- Pierce Butler (Irish politician, born 1922) (1922–1999), Irish Fine Gael Senator

== See also ==
- Lee Pierce Butler (1884–1953), American professor of librarian science
