= Brett Butler =

Brett Butler may refer to:

- Brett Butler (actress) (born 1958), American actress, writer and stand-up comedy performer
- Brett Butler (baseball) (born 1957), American baseball center fielder
- Brett Butler (racing driver) (born 1985), American NASCAR driver

== See also ==
- Butler (surname)
