= Justice Butler (disambiguation) =

Pierce Butler (judge) (1866–1939) was an associate justice of the Supreme Court of the United States. Justice Butler may also refer to:

- Charles C. Butler (1865–1946), associate justice of the Colorado Supreme Court
- Fred M. Butler (1854–1932), associate justice of the Vermont Supreme Court
- Louis B. Butler (born 1952), associate justice of the Wisconsin Supreme Court
- Thomas B. Butler (1806–1873), associate justice of the Connecticut Supreme Court
- Turner Butler (1869–1938), associate justice of the Arkansas Supreme Court
