= Roland C. Butler =

American circus press agent (1887–1961)

Roland Butler
- Born: Roland C. Butler; June 2, 1887; Wayland, Massachusetts, U.S.
- Died: October 20, 1961 (aged 74); Bradenton, Florida, U.S.
- Occupations: Press agent; illustrator
- Employer: Ringling Bros. and Barnum & Bailey Circus
- Awards: Circus Hall of Fame (1963)

Roland C. Butler (June 2, 1887 – October 20, 1961) was an American circus press agent and illustrator for multiple circuses but was best known for working with Ringling Bros. and Barnum & Bailey Circus for more than three decades. Butler was inducted into the Circus Hall of Fame in 1963.

== Early life ==
Roland C. Butler was born on June 2, 1887, in Wayland, Massachusetts, United States.

At the age of five, he moved with his family to New Bedford, where his father became telegraph editor of the New Bedford Standard.

== Career ==
Bulter began working as a sketch artist at the New Bedford Standard at age eighteen, later relocating to Boston. He entered the advertising field in 1910 with The Boston Globe as an artist and copywriter, and later worked for the Boston Herald and Boston American. He was responsible for directing the art departments and supervising amusement advertising.

== Circus life ==
When Charles Sparks' circus played Boston in 1920, Roland Butler was hired to design flyers and artwork, holding the stationary job for two years before joining the touring troupe for two more.

After his work with the smaller circus, Butler was recruited in 1923 by Charles Ringling to serve as a "contracting press agent" for Ringling Bros. and Barnum & Bailey Circus. After a few years away, he returned to Sparks Circus in 1926 and worked there until 1929.

After the Ringling brothers acquired Sparks Circus, Sells Floto Circus, and others in the winter of 1929, Butler returned to oversee all advertising. That year, he was promoted to "General Press Representative." Butler, leading the circus press department, worked to stir public interest and publicize the show's animal, trapeze, stunt, and unusual acts. He handled poster and program design, wrote promotional material, and ensured special billing for star acts.

Butler created the name "Ubangi" for a circus group in 1930 and made them nationally known through his depictions of their plate-lipped appearance.

From 1938 to 1949, Butler promoted a 525-pound gorilla as the star of the Ringling menagerie. Named Gargantua by Henry Ringling North, Butler expanded the gorilla's nickname to include "the Great" and marketed it to the American public as "The World's Most Terrifying Living Creature". He played a key role in making Gargantua into one of the biggest circus attractions of all time. In 1941, he even staged a wedding between Gargantua and a female gorilla named M'Toto as a joint feature.

Each season, Butler traveled north to promote the Madison Square Garden opening, then toured the country with his wife, covering around 50,000 miles yearly by train or car. To remain near the circus winter quarters, he moved to Palmetto, Florida in 1944.

Butler continued as director of newspaper and magazine advertising when John Ringling appointed Edward Knoblaugh as publicity director. After thirty years of service, Butler retired from the circus in June 1954. He was succeeded Ed Knoblaugh.

He joined the Clyde Beatty Circus as the head of the press department in January 1955. In December 1955, he made a short-lived return at the Ringling Circus press department after resigning eight months prior. The veteran publicist resigned again in January 1956.

Butler, following his Ringling retirement, kept producing artwork for smaller circuses and worked as a publicity consultant for Clyde Beatty-Cole Bros. Combined Circus.

== Personal life ==
He married Estelle May Butler and had one daughter.

== Death ==
Roland Butler died in Bradenton, Florida, United States, on October 20, 1961, at 74 years old.

== Legacy ==
For more than three decades, Roland C. Butler was known among colleagues and the press as a top circus press agent and poster illustrator. Among the acts Butler promoted were Goliath the sea elephant, Gargantua the Great, the Doll Family, the Ubangis, pygmy elephants, Mister Mistin the xylophone prodigy, plus many aerial artists, riders, and wild animal trainers.

Butler coined the phrase "The circus is coming!".

Roland Butler was inducted into the International Circus Hall of Fame in 1963.

Gene Plowden wrote Circus Press Agent: The Life and Times of Roland Butler in 1984.
