= Lynne Butler =

American mathematician

Lynne Marie Butler (born 1959) is an American mathematician whose research interests include algebraic combinatorics, group theory, and mathematical statistics. She is a professor of mathematics at Haverford College.

== Early life and education ==
Butler's parents were both medical professionals. She is the identical twin sister of Laurie Butler, now a professor of chemistry at the University of Chicago; they were the youngest of six siblings, and grew up in Garden City, New York. After Butler's father had a stroke, the family moved to St. Petersburg, Florida, where Butler went to high school. She credits a high school mathematics teacher, Mr. Mead, for sparking her interest in mathematics, writing "He wanted to learn group theory, and so did I, so we learned together."

Butler majored in mathematics at the University of Chicago, graduating in 1981. She went to the Massachusetts Institute of Technology for doctoral study in mathematics, intending to work in algebraic topology despite warnings about the professor she would be working with from other women in the department. He thought that the prospect of marriage and children would make women unable to concentrate on mathematics, refused to let her read his recent work, and eventually told her that her difficulty in reading a paper "confirmed his bad opinion of female mathematicians". On the advice of the department chair, in order to avoid the possibility that her former advisor would be asked to recommend her, she changed her research topic. Instead, she began working in combinatorics with Richard P. Stanley as her new advisor. She completed her Ph.D. in 1986.

In 2013, bored with combinatorics and noting that many of her female students were doing particularly well the application-oriented components of her classes, she returned to the University of Chicago for a master's degree in statistics.

== Career ==
After completing her doctorate, Butler became a postdoctoral researcher and then, a year later, an assistant professor at Princeton University. However, at Princeton she encountered much of the same explicit sexism that had tormented her at MIT. One faculty member in her department assumed she was a secretary and handed secretarial work to her, and she was the target of comments about the incompatibility of child-bearing with mathematics, or remarks to her like "I really do feel women are genetically inferior in math", to the point that she says she "locked myself in my office and didn't come out for four years".

Despite marrying Princeton computer scientist F. Miller Maley, she moved in 1991 from Princeton to Haverford College, where she had a potential collaborator on the faculty and could find a more collegial atmosphere. She became a full professor at Haverford in 1996, the same year in which she was a visiting research professor at the Mathematical Sciences Research Institute. At Haverford, she has served several terms as department chair, and was associate provost for 2004–2005.

== Research ==
Butler's 1986 dissertation was Combinatorial Properties of Partially Ordered Sets associated with Partitions and Finite Abelian Groups. She subsequently published some of this research as "A unimodality result in the enumeration of subgroups of a finite abelian group" (Proc. AMS 1987), which concerned applications of algebraic combinatorics in group theory. Her work in this line of research also included her book Subgroup Lattices and Symmetric Functions (Mem. AMS 112, 1994).

Butler's 2013 master's thesis was Latent Dirichlet Allocation for a Corpus of Prayers. Since completing this degree, her teaching and undergraduate research direction have turned from combinatorics to probability theory and statistics.

Butler has also studied John Nash and his work on game theory, speaking in general-audience mathematics talks about connections between this work and collaboration in art.
