= David Butler (footballer, born 1945) =

English footballer

Personal information
- Date of birth: 23 March 1945 (age 81)
- Place of birth: Thornaby-on-Tees, England
- Position: Full back

Youth career
- Stockton

Senior career*
Years	Team	Apps	(Gls)
1964–1970	Workington	198	(8)
1970–1976	Watford	168	(2)
Total		366	(10)
- * Club domestic league appearances and goals

David Butler (born 23 March 1945) is an English former professional footballer who made over 350 career league appearances in a professional career which lasted from 1964 to 1976.

== Career ==
Born in Thornaby-on-Tees, played as a full back for Stockton, Workington and Watford.
