= Jerry Butler (disambiguation) =

Jerry Butler (1939–2025) was an American soul singer and songwriter.

Jerry Butler may also refer to:

- Jerry Butler (actor) (1959–2018), American pornographic actor
- Jerry Butler (American football) (born 1957), American football player
- Jerry Butler (ice hockey) (born 1951), Canadian ice hockey player
- Jerry Butler (Texas politician) (1929–1979), American politician in the Texas House of Representatives
- Jerry Butler, candidate in the 2008 North Carolina Senate election

== See also ==
- Gerry Butler or Gerald Butler (born 1969), Scottish actor and film producer
- Gerald Butler (disambiguation)
