= Joe Beidler =

Biographical details
- Born: November 15, 1918
- Died: October 31, 2016 (aged 97); West Hartford, Connecticut, U.S.

Playing career

Football
- 1940–1941: Trinity (CT)

Baseball
- 1942: Hartford Bees
- 1946: Hartford Chiefs
- Position: Shortstop (baseball)

Coaching career (HC unless noted)

Football
- 1946–1948: Trinity (CT) (assistant)
- 1949–1950: Whitman (assistant)
- 1951–1954: Whitman

Baseball
- 1950–1955: Whitman

Head coaching record
- Overall: 14–18–1 (football)

Joseph B. Beidler (November 15, 1918 – October 31, 2016) was an American minor league baseball player and college football and college baseball coach. He served as the head football coach at Whitman College in Walla Walla, Washington from 1951 to 1954. Prior to arriving at Whitman, Beidler served as an assistant football coach at his alma mater, Trinity College in Hartford, Connecticut from 1946 to 1948.

== Head coaching record ==
=== Football ===
Year	Team	Overall	Conference	Standing	Bowl/playoffs
Whitman Fighting Missionaries (Northwest Conference) (1951–1954)
1951	Whitman	3–5–1	1–3–1	T–4th	
1952	Whitman	3–6	0–5	6th	
1953	Whitman	4–3	2–3	T–4th	
1954	Whitman	4–4	1–4	T–4th	
Whitman:		14–18–1	4–15–1		
Total:		14–17–1			
