= Linda Butler =

American photographer

- Known for: Photography

Linda Butler (born 1947 or 1948) is an American photographer.

Her work is included in collections of the Museum of Fine Arts Houston and the Birmingham Museum of Art.
