= Joseph Butler (disambiguation) =

Joseph Butler (1692–1752) was an English bishop, theologian, apologist, and philosopher.

Joseph Butler may also refer to:

== Sportspeople ==
- Joe Butler (boxer) (1864–1941), American boxer
- Joe Butler (footballer, born 1879) (1879–1941), English goalkeeper for Stockport County, Clapton Orient, Glossop, Sunderland & Lincoln City
- Joe Butler (footballer, born 1943), English football defender for Newcastle United and Swindon Town
- Joey Butler (born 1986), baseball player
- Jos Buttler (born 1990), English cricketer

== Others ==
- Joseph Butler (architect) (1804–1884), English architect, surveyor and builder
- Joseph Butler (merchant) (1862–1934), New Zealand sawmiller and timber merchant
- Joseph G. Butler Jr. (1840–1927), American industrialist, philanthropist, and popular historian
- Joseph George Butler (1869–?), British politician and trade unionist
- Joseph Niklaus Bütler (1822–1885), Swiss painter
- Joe Butler (Joseph Campbell Butler, born 1941), musician, founding member of The Lovin' Spoonful
