= Paul Butler (artist) =

Canadian artist

Paul Butler (born 1973 in Winnipeg, Manitoba) is an artist with an interest in multidisciplinary, social and alternative pedagogical practices. His practice includes hosting the collage parties, a touring experimental studio established 1997 and directing the operations of The Other Gallery, a nomadic commercial gallery focused on overlooked artists' practices established in 2001. In 2007, he founded the UpperTradingPost.com, a website that facilitates artist trading. He also initiated the experimental school Reverse Pedagogy that began at the Banff Centre for the Arts in 2008, and has since travelled to Venice in 2009, among other locations. He has exhibited at the Museum of Contemporary Art, Los Angeles, Plug In ICA, Winnipeg, White Columns, New York City, Creative Growth Art Centre, Oakland and Sparwasser HQ, Berlin. Butler has contributed writing to the book Decentre: Concerning Artist-Run Culture (2008) and the magazines Canadian Art and Hunter and Cook. He was the Art Gallery of Ontario's first Artist-in-Residence, from October to November 2011.
