= Anthony Butler =

Anthony Butler may refer to:

- Tony Butler (footballer)
- Anthony Butler (MP) for Wallingford (UK Parliament constituency)
- Tony Butler (musician)
- Anthony Butler (diplomat), US ambassador to Mexico in the 1830s
- Anthony Butler, Viscount Thurles (1916–1940), British aristocrat, soldier, and journalist

== See also ==
- Tony Butler (disambiguation)
