= Tony Butler =

Tony Butler may refer to:

- Tony Butler (broadcaster) (1935–2023), British sports broadcaster
- Tony Butler (musician) (born 1957), bassist for the Scottish new wave band Big Country
- Tony Butler (footballer) (born 1972), English footballer
- Tony Butler (rugby union) (born 2002), Irish rugby union player

== See also ==
- Anthony Butler (disambiguation)
