= Gordon H. Butler =

American politician (1889–1964)

Gordon Butler

Member of the Minnesota Senate
- In office 1951–1964

Personal details
- Born: February 2, 1889 Scipio, Indiana, U.S.
- Died: August 1, 1964 (aged 75) Minnesota, U.S.
- Children: 3
- Education: Purdue University (BS)

Military service
- Branch/service: United States Army
- Unit: United States Army Corps of Engineers
- Battles/wars: World War I World War II

Gordon H. Butler Sr. (February 2, 1889 – August 1, 1964) was an American businessman and politician.

== Early life and education ==
Butler was born in Scipio, Indiana, and graduated from Purdue University in 1913 with a bachelor's degree in civil engineering. He also went to the University of London in 1918 and 1919.

== Career ==
Butler moved to Duluth, Minnesota with his wife and family in 1914 and was a civil engineer and general contractor for the concrete business. He served in the United States Army Corps of Engineers during World War I and World War II and was commissioned a major. Butler served in the Minnesota Senate from 1951 until his death in 1964.
