= Sarah Poage Caldwell Butler =

American librarian and civic leader

- Butler speaking at the library opening in 1921
- Born: August 21, 1892; Wytheville, Virginia
- Died: December 2, 1983 (aged 91)
- Known for: Roanoke Public Library

Sarah Poage Caldwell Butler (August 21, 1892–December 2, 1983) was a librarian and civic leader known for her work in establishing a public library in Roanoke, Virginia.

== Career ==
When Butler returned to Virginia after being a children's librarian in New York City for several years, she became interested in forming a public library to serve the city. She was part of a group of many civic organizations, including the Woman's Civic Betterment Club, which formed the Roanoke Library Association in 1920 with Butler as its first president. A month later they had formed a plan to renovate a vacant mansion to house the city's new library. The city agreed with the plan but required the organization to raise $30,000 to provide the books and library furnishings. The Roanoke Public Library formally opened in May 1921 with Butler as its first president, speaking at the opening. Later that same year, working with civic leaders Lucy Addison, Dr. Arthur L. James, and Dr. L. Downing, Butler helped the library open a branch in the Gainsboro community for Roanoke's Black citizens who had also been part of the fundraising campaign for the library.

Butler was also interested in gardening and joined the Roanoke Valley Garden Club in 1925, which became a member club of the Garden Club of Virginia in 1929. The club handled the landscaping around the main library branch, for which they won the Garden Club of Virginia's Massie Distinguished Achievement Medal in 1930. Butler held many leadership roles in the Garden Club, ultimately serving as its president from 1950 to 1952.

== Early life and education ==
Butler was born in Wytheville, Virginia, to Manley Morrison Caldwell, a lawyer, and Willie Brown Walker Caldwell, a civic leader. The family moved to Roanoke for the school system. Her mother was a civic leader who was an organizer of the local Woman's Civic Betterment Club.

Butler graduated from Roanoke City High School and Mary Baldwin University, and then graduated from Pratt Institute Library School in 1913. She worked at Cleveland Public Library as part of a training program and returned to New York to take a job at New York Public Library.

She married William Wilson Samuel Butler, a doctor, on December 5, 1917. The wedding announcement called her "one of the most popular and interesting girls of Roanoke's youngest set." Her husband joined the war effort; he worked first in Brooklyn and then was re-assigned to Roanoke.

The couple had two sons, William Wilson Samuel Butler III and Manley Caldwell Butler, who served in the House of Representatives from 1972 to 1983.

== Death and legacy ==
Butler died on December 2, 1983, and was buried in Roanoke's Evergreen Cemetery.

The Roanoke Public Library board commissioned a bronze sculpture as a memorial to her, which was installed at the library in Elmwood Park in 1988.
