= Andrew Butler (disambiguation) =

Andrew Butler (1796–1857) was a US senator.

Andrew Butler may also refer to:

- Andrew M. Butler, British academic
- Andy Butler (born 1983), English professional footballer
- Andrew Butler, American musician and member of the band Hercules and Love Affair
- Andrew Butler (MP), Member of Parliament for Suffolk
- Andrew Butler (rower) (born 1973), Australian rower
