= Percy Butler =

Percy Butler may refer to:

- Percy M. Butler (1912–2015), British zoologist and paleontologist
- Percy Butler (American football) (born 2000), American football player
