= Phil Butler =

English rugby league footballer

Personal information
- Full name: Philip Butler

Playing information
- Position: Scrum-half
Club
Years	Team	Pld	T	G	FG	P
1974–82	Featherstone Rovers	71+7	11	0	8	41

Phil Butler is a former professional rugby league footballer who played in the 1970s and 1980s. He played at club level for Featherstone Rovers, as a scrum-half.

== Club career ==
Phil Butler made his début for Featherstone Rovers on Saturday 12 October 1974.
