= Edward Gerald Butler =

- Born: April 24, 1770
- Died: November 30, 1824 (aged 54)

Sir Edward Gerald Butler (24 April 1770 – 30 November 1824) was an Irish soldier.

== Biography ==
He was a son of Garret (or Gerald) Butler of Cashel, County Tipperary, and Anne Butler, of Hemmingstown.

Early in his military career, he was one of the heroes of a battle to save the Austrian emperor, Francis II. Butler entered the army by purchasing a cornetcy in the 14th light dragoons on 30 September 1788, gazetted August 1789. He was promoted Lieutenant dated 13 October 1791, gazetted Dec 1791. He exchanged to the 24th Regiment of Foot, gazetted August 1792. In 1793, he became Captain of an Independent Company, gazetted Sept 1793. Butler then purchased a cornetcy in 15th Regiment of Dragoons, gazetted March 1794. He was sent to take part in the Flanders Campaign, which was part of the French Revolutionary Wars.

On 24 April 1794, during the Battle of Villers-en-Cauchies, he was one of the officers of the two companies escorting the Emperor Francis II (the other was a company of Black Hussars) which saved Emperor Francis II from being taken prisoner by a numerically superior French force. They charged, and the French fled, leaving three guns behind them. The emperor conferred upon each of the eight English officers who were present the Military Order of Maria Theresa, and King George III knighted them as well. (This was before the regulations of 1812 relative to Foreign Orders came into effect.)

Butler had been promoted lieutenant in the 11th light dragoons in May 1794, and he was in 1796 gazetted major without purchase in the newly raised 87th Royal Irish Fusiliers regiment. With it he served in the West Indies in 1797 at St Lucia where he met and married Rosetta Martin des Rameaux around this time. She died in 1816, leaving him a widower until his own death in 1824.

In 1804, he was promoted lieutenant-colonel, and in 1806 the 87th was ordered to form part of the British invasion force under Sir Samuel Auchmuty attacking Montevideo. In the attack on Montevideo Butler especially distinguished himself, and also in General Whitelocke's attempt to capture Buenos Aires, where the 87th had 17 officers and 400 men killed and wounded.

From 1807 to 1810, while the 2nd battalion, under Colonel Hugh Gough, was distinguishing itself in the Peninsula, the 1st battalion of the 87th, under Butler, garrisoned the Cape of Good Hope.

In 1809, he was made Commandant of Simonstown. In 1810, he was second in command of a force ordered from the Cape to assist Major-general Abercromby in the capture of Mauritius, but the island was already taken when the contingent arrived. Although he saw no more active service, Butler was promoted colonel in 1811 and major-general in 1814, and was appointed Commandant of Mahebourg, Mauritius. He retired due to ill health in 1818.

== Death ==
Butler died at Ballyadams, Queen's County (now County Laois), Ireland, on 30 November 1824, aged 54. He was survived by five children.

== Sources ==
"Butler, Edward Gerard" . Dictionary of National Biography. London: Smith, Elder & Co. 1885–1900.
