= Michael Butler =

Michael, Mike, Mikey and Mick Butler may refer to:

== Law and politics ==
- Michael E. Butler (1855–1926), American politician
- Sir Michael Butler (diplomat) (1927–2013), British diplomat
- Michael Butler (politician), American politician in Missouri

== Sports ==
=== Hurling ===
- Mick Butler (Dublin hurler) (1916–1987), Irish hurler
- Mick Butler (Wexford hurler) (born 1950), Irish hurler
- Mikey Butler (born 2000), Irish hurler

=== Other sports ===
- Mike Butler (basketball) (1946–2018), American basketball player
- Mick Butler (footballer) (born 1951), English footballer
- Mike Butler (American football) (born 1954), American football defensive end
- Michael Butler (footballer) (born 1976), Liberian footballer

== Others ==
- Michael Butler (producer) (1926–2022), American theatrical producer
- Michael Butler (musician) (born 1961), American musician
- Michael Butler (computer scientist), Irish computer scientist
