= Guy Butler =

Guy Butler may refer to:

- Guy Butler (athlete) (1899–1981), British runner
- Guy Butler (poet) (1918–2001), South African poet and writer
