= Kevin Butler =

Kevin Butler may refer to:

- Kevin Butler (American football) (born 1962), American football placekicker
- Kevin Butler (character), fictional character in Sony's PlayStation 3 marketing campaigns
- Kevin Butler (streetball player), a.k.a. "Bizness", American streetball player
