= Albert Butler (Baptist minister) =

Albert Butler (c. 1887 – 15 July 1947) was a Baptist minister in Australia, based successively in Hobart (Tasmania), Sydney (New South Wales), and Brisbane (Queensland). He served a term as president of the Baptist Union, and of the Council of Churches, in each of these states.

== History ==
Butler was born in Perth, Tasmania, one of five sons and three daughters of Edward or Edmund Butler (c. 1858 – 10 January 1931). As a practising preacher with no access to a theological college, he took the "Home Mission" path to ordination, which entailed a series of annual examinations by the Home Mission superintendent, Rev. F. J. Dunkley.

He began preaching at Baptist churches in Tasmania, successively of Bracknell 1910–11, Deloraine 1914–1916, when he was ordained as a minister of the Baptist faith. He served in Moonah 1916–24, then he was called to the church of Concord, New South Wales, being succeeded at Moonah by R. Farrer, also of Perth, Tasmania. During WWI he enlisted as a military chaplain, with the rank of captain, involved in recruiting.

He was elected president of the Tasmanian Baptist Union 1921–22.
He was secretary of the Council of Churches of Tasmania for 1922–23.
and succeeded George Wainwright as editor of the Baptist Chronicle, official organ of the Tasmanian Baptist Union.

He was pastor at the Baptist church in Concord, New South Wales (sometimes referred to as the Strathfield church) from May 1924 to November 1935, during which time the building was replaced, at a cost of £4,400, opened 31 March 1928. His successor was Frank Robinson.

He was secretary of the Baptist Theological College for seven years. and president of the Baptist Union of New South Wales for the year 1934–35
He was secretary of Baptist College Council in 1926, president, Council of Religious Education in 1927, and president of the local region of Christian Endeavour in 1931.

Butler and his wife arrived in Brisbane on 6 November 1935 with their two daughters. The two sons remained in Sydney, where they had employment. During the latter years of the Second World War, Brisbane was host to a great number of Empire and Allied servicemen, and the Tabernacle found a greatly increased congregation.

He died suddenly, at home, while still an active minister.

== Family ==
Butler married Laura Martha Ball of Longford, Tasmania on 8 April 1912. They had four children, two sons and two daughters. The elder daughter, Lorna Etta Butler (died 2009) married Ian Harris Fraser on 9 March 1940.

They had a home at River Road, Auchenflower in 1936; Their last residence was "Maxley", Coronation Drive, Auchenflower or Toowong.
