= Charlie Butler (Australian footballer) =

Australian rules footballer

Personal information
- Full name: Edmund Charles Butler
- Born: 3 June 1881; Stratford, Victoria
- Died: 24 February 1945 (aged 63); Dandenong, Victoria
- Original team: Mordialloc

Playing career^{1}
Years	Club	Games (Goals)
1903–04	South Melbourne	6 (0)
- ^{1} Playing statistics correct to the end of 1904.

Edmund Charles Butler (3 June 1881 – 24 February 1945) was an Australian rules footballer who played with South Melbourne in the Victorian Football League (VFL).

He served on Dandenong Council for fifteen years and was active in public affairs in the Dandenong area for many years.
