= Walter Butler =

Walter Butler may refer to:

- Walter Butler of Polestown, high sheriff of County Kilkenny, Ireland, 1483
- Walter Butler of Nodstown (died 1560)
- Walter Butler, 11th Earl of Ormond (1569–1632/3), British Army officer
- Walter Butler of Roscrea (c. 1600–1634), Irish soldier of fortune and assassin of Wallenstein
- Walter Butler, 16th Earl of Ormonde (1703–1783)
- Walter Butler (Loyalist) (1752–1781), Loyalist during the American Revolution, son of John Butler
- Walter Butler, 1st Marquess of Ormonde (1770–1820), Irish peer and politician
- Walter S. Butler (1823–1913), political figure in New Brunswick
- Walter H. Butler (1852–1931), US representative from Iowa
- Walter Butler (architect) (1860–1949), Australian architect
- Walter Butler (cricketer) (1882–1966), Australian cricketer
- Walter Butler (Australian politician) (1892–1937), New South Wales Legislative Assembly member for Hurstville
- W. E. Butler (1898–1978), occultist and esoteric author in Britain
- Walter Garth Butler (1923–1995), English footballer
- Walter Butler (French businessman), French/American businessman, head of Butler Capital Partners
- Sir Walter Butler, 1st Baronet (died 1650), Irish nobleman
- Walter B. Butler (1858–1933), owner of Walter Butler Shipbuilders Inc. in Superior, Wisconsin

== See also ==
- Walter Butler Wilkinson (1781–1807), Canadian political figure
- Walter Butler Cheadle (1836–1910), English paediatrician
