= Richard Butler (academic) =

Tourist Geographer

- Born: 1943
- Occupations: Academic, geographer

Academic background
- Education: University of Glasgow

Academic work
- Discipline: Geography
- Sub-discipline: Tourism

Richard W. Butler is an academic and emeritus professor of human geography at the University of Strathclyde. He is most known for creating the tourism area cycle of evolution model aka the Butler Model.

== Life ==
Butler graduated with a BA at the University of Nottingham, and later a PhD at the University of Glasgow. After his education, he taught at the University of Western Ontario for 30 years, then at the University of Surrey where he held the position of Deputy Head at the School of Management.

Later in life, he consulted for countries such as Canada, United Kingdom, and Australia.

== Butler Model of Tourism ==
The Butler Model of Tourism is a geographic model developed by Richard Butler and published through The Canadian Geographer while he was at the University of Western Ontario.

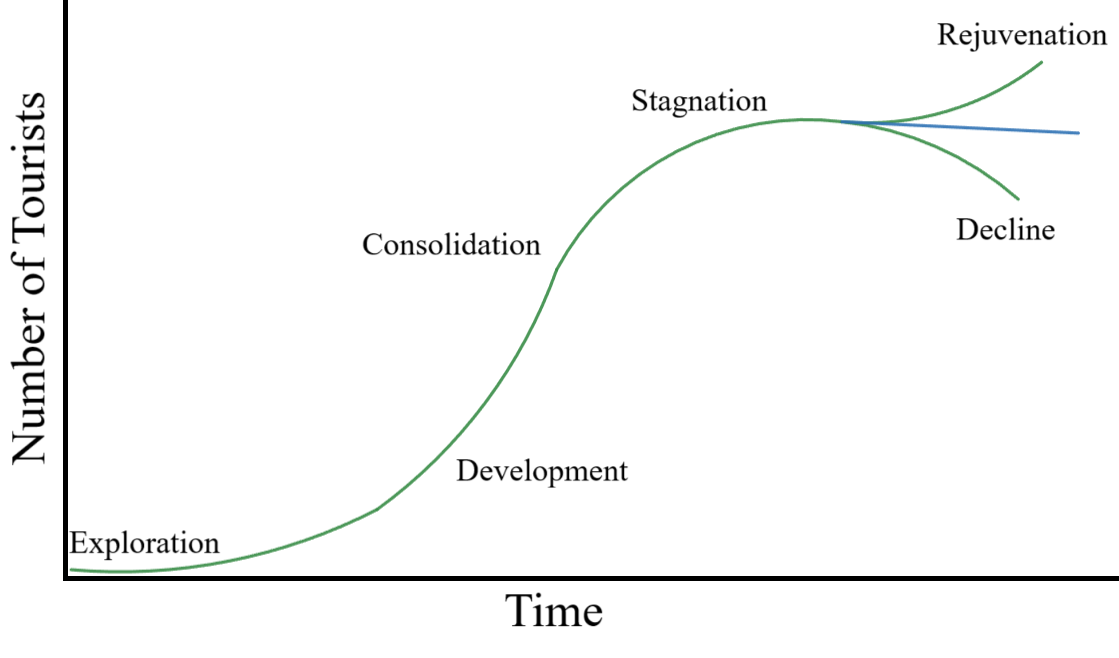
Graph of the Number of Tourists over Time to show the Butler Model

The model is primarily concerned with the changing number of tourists over a given time at a tourist destination or settlement. The model also concerns itself with the economics of the community and site surrounding the destination.

This model outlines 5 stages of a tourist attraction and of a more traditional resort model. It is not a transitional economic model for, say, a city.

=== Discovery/Exploration Stage ===
During this stage a settlement is discovered by a people who tell others about their experience there. This leads locals to seize the opportunity for tourism, aiming to meet their needs through small-scale services.

=== Development Stage ===
More tourists begin to arrive at the attraction due to word of mouth and small-scale marketing. Local government and industry pop up around the location and develop primary tourist infrastructure such as hotels, restaurants, and shops.

=== Consolidation Stage ===
Mass tourism overtakes the original scope. This may lead to resentment from people who have not benefited from the changes. Local identity and culture may be upended. It is also known as the Success Stage.

=== Stagnation Stage ===
The initial appeal is lost due to development, loss of culture, or intolerance from locals. This leads to economic stagnation.

==== Decline, Continued Stagnation, or Rejuvenation ====
Decline and continued stagnation often follows stagnation through neglect. Rejuvenation can be accomplished by making the attraction more attractive, such as investments in exotic tourism, ecotourism, adventure tourism or investments in companies or industries surrounding the attraction.

== Recognition ==
Butler has been recognised by the Royal Geographical Society for his contribution to theories relating to tourism, explicitly mentioning his paper entitled 'The Concept of a Tourist Area Cycle of Evolution.'m In 2016 Butler was awarded the Ulysses Prize Medal by the United Nations World Tourism Organisation for "excellence in the creation and dissemination of knowledge".
