= Thomas Butler (Paralympic swimmer) =

Australian paralympic swimmer

Thomas Rockett Butler (14 February 1913 – 2 June 1963) was the second Australian to participate in the International Stoke Mandeville Games, the precursor to the modern Paralympic Games, when he represented Australia in swimming in 1953 and again in 1954. Butler won the backstroke event in swimming at the 2nd International Stoke Mandeville Games in 1953, and was awarded his medal by the Parliamentary Secretary for Health, Patricia Hornsby-Smith. Butler placed second in the same event in 1954. Charlene Todman, who competed in table tennis in 1951, had been the first Australian to participate in the International Stoke Mandeville Games.

Born in Townsville, Queensland, Butler was working as a farm hand in Western Australia by 1936. He enlisted in the Australian Army in Manjimup, Western Australia in 1941 and served until the end of the war as a corporal in Syria and Palestine and later in New Guinea and Borneo. Butler was a farmer in Manjimup when he was paralysed following an industrial accident in 1947, aged 34. He spent over two years rehabilitating in Hollywood Hospital in Perth, Western Australia. Following his release from hospital in 1950, he drove home to Manjimup in his new Holden car, with specially designed controls that he could drive with his fingers.

Seeking further rehabilitation, Butler travelled to England to receive treatment by Dr Ludwig Guttmann at the Stoke Mandeville Hospital in Aylesbury. Although he was a veteran of World War II, he was ineligible for treatment at the Repatriation Hospital in Melbourne because his accident had occurred after the war. It was during his rehabilitation at Stoke Mandeville Hospital that he competed in the Games.

Butler returned to Manjimup in 1954. He died 2 June 1963 and was buried in the Busselton Cemetery.
