= Adam Butler =

Adam Butler may refer to:

- Adam Butler (American football), American football defensive tackle
- Adam Butler (baseball) (born 1973), former Major League Baseball pitcher
- Adam Butler (politician) (1931–2008), British Conservative Party politician
- Vert (music) (Adam Butler, born 1972), electronic music producer
- Adam Butler (born 1982), Australian rules footballer who was drafted to the Fremantle Football Club
