= Daniel Butler (minister) =

American minister (1808–1893)

Daniel Butler (June 23, 1808 – February 4, 1893) was an American minister.

Butler was born in Hartford, Connecticut, on June 23, 1808. He was the son of Henry and Chloe (Hinsdale) Butler, who removed in 1811 to Blandford, Massachusetts. At the age of 16 he returned to Hartford and spent four years in a printing office. He then went to Westfield, Mass., where for two years his time was divided between the care of an invalid father and preparation for College. His father dying in the spring of 1830, he was admitted to Yale College in the following autumn, but with health so much broken that he was obliged to withdraw during Freshman year, and to enter the next class. He graduated in 1835.

On leaving College he went directly to Andover Theological Seminary, where he completed the three years' course. On October 31, 1838, he was ordained and installed over the Village (Congregational) Church in Dorchester, Mass., where he spent seven years with a united and affectionate people. In 1845 he accepted an appointment as agent of the American Bible Society. He then moved his residence to Westborough, Mass. Six years later he was chosen Secretary of the Massachusetts Bible Society, and he retained this office as long as he was able to labor. He removed about 1853 to Groton, Mass., and thence in 1865 to Waverley, Mass. He represented the town in the Massachusetts State Legislature in 1883.

He married, in Trenton, New York on November 8, 1838, Jane Douglas, by whom he had five children, of whom two died in infancy. About a year before his own death his wife and his elder son died with a month of each other; from that date he failed gradually, and after a final illness of seven weeks he died at his home in Waverley on February 4, 1893, in his 85th year. He left a son and a daughter.

Daniel Butler Elementary School in Belmont MA is named after the preacher; his son Henry Butler went on to be a school headmaster.
