= Laurie Butler =

American chemist

Laurie Jeanne Butler (born 1959) is an American physical chemist known for her experimental work testing the Born–Oppenheimer approximation on separability of nuclear and electron motions. She is a Fellow of the American Physical Society and a professor emeritus of chemistry at the University of Chicago.

== Education and career ==
Butler's parents were both medical professionals. She is the identical twin sister of Lynne Butler, now a professor of mathematics at Haverford College; they were the youngest of six siblings, and grew up in Garden City, New York. After Butler's father had a stroke, the family moved to St. Petersburg, Florida, where Butler went to high school.

She started her undergraduate education at Johns Hopkins University, intending to study molecular biology or neuroscience. After discovering the large number of animal sacrifices needed for experiments in those areas, she shifted her interests to chemistry, and after a year she transferred to the Massachusetts Institute of Technology (MIT). She completed her bachelor's degree at MIT in 1981.

She went to the University of California, Berkeley for her doctoral studies, working there with Yuan T. Lee on photodissociation. After completing her Ph.D. in 1985, she worked as a postdoctoral researcher at the University of Wisconsin before joining the University of Chicago faculty in 1987.

== Recognition ==
Butler won a Sloan Research Fellowship in 1992 and she won the Llewellyn John and Harriet Manchester Quantrell Award for Excellence in Undergraduate Teaching at The University of Chicago in 1993. She was elected as a Fellow of the American Physical Society in 2002. In 2011 she became a Fellow of the American Association for the Advancement of Science "for distinguished contributions to the field of physical chemistry, particularly for elegant experimental studies of chemical reaction dynamics of radical and molecular species", and in the same year she also became a Fellow of the American Chemical Society. In 2018 she was elected to the American Academy of Arts and Sciences.

== Personal life ==
Butler's husband Michael Stein is the Ralph and Mary Otis Isham Professor in Statistics at the University of Chicago. They have one daughter.

== Textbook ==
Butler is a co-author of the 8th edition of the textbook Principles of Modern Chemistry (Cengage, 2016) with David W. Oxtoby and H. P. Gillis.
