= Dave Sullivan (Illinois politician) =

American politician

Member of the Illinois Senate from the 33rd district 28th District (1998-2003)
- In office December 1998 – September 2005
- Preceded by: Marty Butler (28th District)
- Succeeded by: Cheryl Axley (33rd District)

Personal details
- Born: December 29, 1964 (age 61) Chicago, Illinois
- Party: Republican
- Occupation: Lobbyist

Dave Sullivan (born December 29, 1964, in Chicago) is a former Illinois State Senator and is a member of the Republican Party. He was first appointed in 1998 to fill a vacancy following the death of former State Senator Marty Butler, and in 2000 and 2002, was subsequently re-elected. He has a Bachelor of Arts in Political Science from Marquette University.

He resigned in September 2005 and did not run for re-election in the 2006 state elections stating that his salary would not cover the cost of sending his four children to Marquette University.

During the 2008 Republican Party presidential primaries, Sullivan worked on behalf of the presidential campaign of former U.S. Senator Fred Thompson as a congressional district chair for Illinois's 9th congressional district.
