= Marie-Claude Bouthillier =

Canadian artist

- Born: 1960 (age 64–65); Montreal, Quebec
- Website: marieclaudebouthillier.org

Marie-Claude Bouthillier (born 1960) is a Canadian artist.

== Career ==
Bouthillier (born in Montreal) graduated with her degree in Visual Arts from Concordia University, then studied at the Banff Center School of Fine Arts, Alta. In 2011, she received the Prix Louis-Comtois from the City of Montreal. In 2013, she was awarded the Prix Ozias-Leduc by the Fondation Émile Nelligan.

Her work is included in the collections of the Musée national des beaux-arts du Québec and the Musée d'art contemporain de Montréal.
