= Francis Butler (cricketer) =

Australian cricketer (1856–1885)

Personal information
- Full name: Francis Leicester Butler
- Born: 28 February 1856; Battery Point, Colony of Tasmania
- Died: 26 August 1885 (aged 29); Westminster, London, England
- Batting: Unknown
- Relatives: Charles Butler(brother); Edward Butler (brother); Leo Butler (nephew)

Career statistics
Competition	First-class
Matches	1
Runs scored	3
Batting average	–
100s/50s	–/–
Top score	3*
Catches/stumpings	–/–
- Source: Cricinfo, 22 August 2019

Francis Leicester Butler (25 February 1856 – 26 August 1885) was an Australian first-class cricketer.

The son of Charles Butler, a solicitor of the Supreme Court of Tasmania, he was born at Battery Point in Hobart in February 1856. He studied in England at St John's College, Oxford. While studying at Oxford, Butler made a single appearance in first-class cricket for the South in the North v South match of 1877 at Hull. In a match in which he played alongside his brother, Edward, he scored 3 unbeaten runs in the South's first-innings. A student of the Inner Temple, he was called to the bar in November 1880. Butler died at Westminster in August 1885, having practised law primarily in Tasmania. Another brother, Charles, also played first-class cricket, as did his nephew Leo Butler.
