= Josh Butler =

Josh Butler may refer to:

- Josh Butler (American football) (born 1996), American football player
- Josh Butler (baseball) (born 1984), American baseball player
- Josh Butler (cricketer) (born 1996), Guernseyman cricketer
