= Edward Butler (cricketer, born 1851) =

Australian cricketer

Personal information
- Born: 15 March 1851; Hobart, Van Diemen's Land
- Died: 5 January 1928 (aged 76); Hobart, Australia

Domestic team information
- Years: Team
- 1873: Victoria
- Source: Cricinfo, 6 June 2015

Edward Butler (15 March 1851 – 5 January 1928) was an Australian cricketer. He played one first-class cricket match for Victoria in 1873. He also played for Tasmania and Marylebone Cricket Club. His brother, Francis, also played first-class cricket.

== See also ==
- List of Victoria first-class cricketers
- List of Tasmanian representative cricketers
