= Amos Butler =

American naturalist, prison reformist (1860–1937)

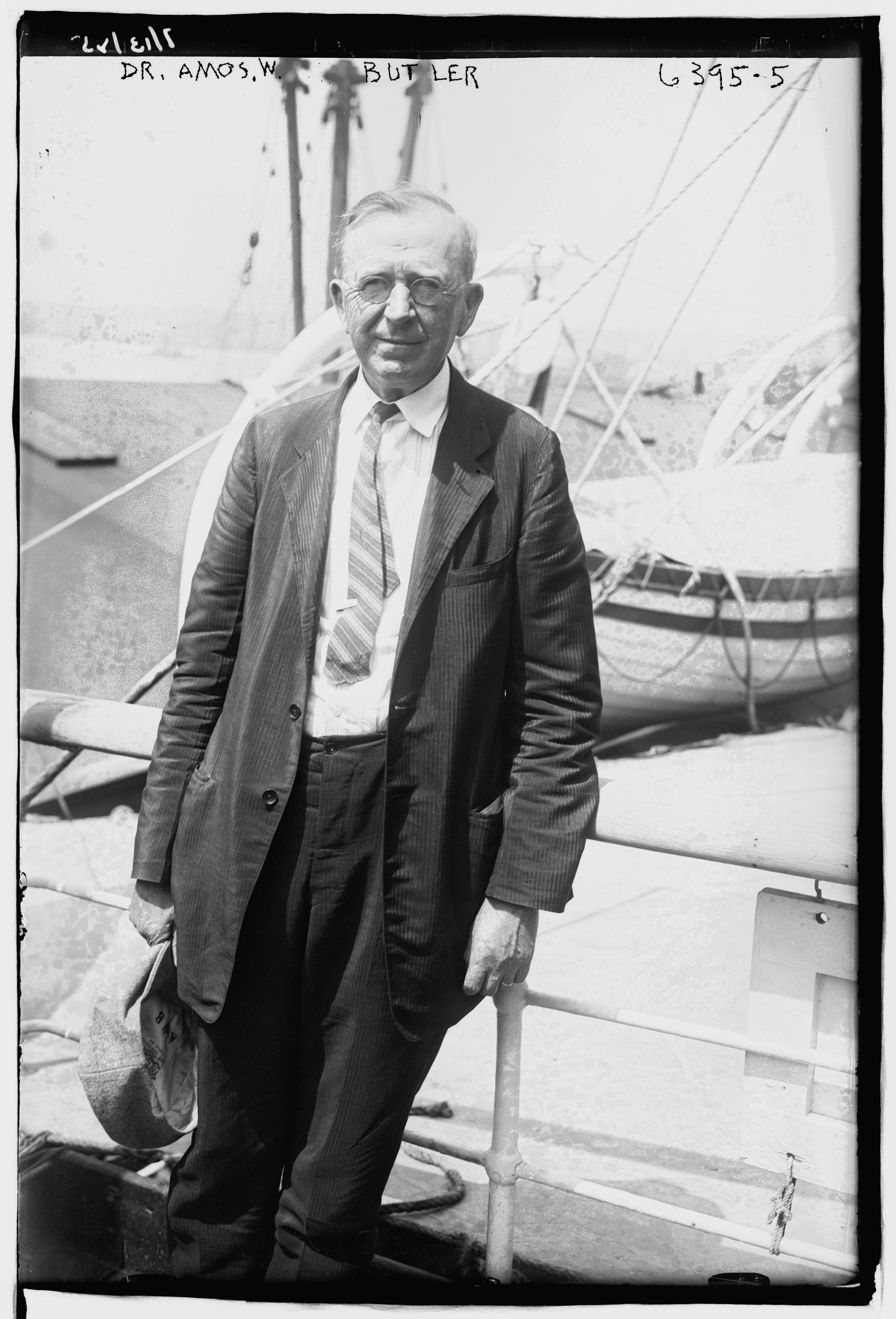
- Born: October 1, 1860; Brookville, Indiana, U.S.
- Died: August 5, 1937 (aged 76)
- Resting place: Crown Hill Cemetery and Arboretum, Section 33, Lot 125
- Citizenship: United States
- Education: Hanover College; Indiana University
- Occupation: Naturalist
- Spouse: Mary I. Reynolds
- Children: Carrie Butler Watts
- Parent(s): Hannah Wright Butler; William W. Butler

Amos William Butler (1 October 1860 – 5 August 1937) was an American naturalist and prison reformer.

== Early life and education ==
Amos Butler was born on 1 October 1860 in Brookville, Indiana to Hannah Wright Butler and William W. Butler. Butler's grandfather, also named Amos Butler, was the first settler of Brookville. Beginning in 1877, Butler attended Hanover College. He later studied at Indiana University Bloomington, where he was a member of Phi Beta Kappa and Sigma Xi, an honorary scientific fraternity.

== Career ==
Butler founded several organizations, including the Brookville Society of Natural History in 1881, the Indiana Academy of Science in 1885, and the International Committee on Mental Hygiene. He was also a member of several other organizations, including the American Ornithologists' Union, the Wilson Ornithological Club, the Biological Society of Washington, the Cincinnati Society of Natural History, and the Nature Study Club of Indiana. From 1897 to 1923, Butler served as Secretary of the Indiana Board of State Charities, where he began researching prison reform and mental disabilities. During his career, he served as president of the National Conference of Social Work and the American Prison Congress, and he was appointed the U.S. delegate to the International Prison Congress three times. Additionally, Butler took part in the inaugural International Mental Health Conference of 1930. He retired in 1930 and began researching the native peoples of Indiana, including silver trading at Fort Ouiatenon.

== Honors ==
A species of fish, Poecilia butleri, and a snake, Butler's garter snake (Thamnophis butleri), were named after him. A chapter of the National Audubon Society in central Indiana is named the Amos Butler Audubon Society. His biography was included in Who's Who in America in 1903 and in American Men of Science in 1910.

== Personal life ==
Butler married Mary I. Reynolds, and had a daughter named Carrie Butler Watts. Butler also had two sons, named Gwyn R. Butler and William R Butler, and one additional daughter besides Watts.
