= Lady Butler =

Lady Butler may refer to:

- Eileen Sutherland-Leveson-Gower, Duchess of Sutherland (1891–1943), born Lady Eileen Butler
- Lady Eleanor Charlotte Butler (1739–1829), Irish noblewoman, one of the Ladies of Llangollen
- Eleanor Howard, Countess of Wicklow, (1915–1997), Irish architect and politician
- Lady Eleanor Talbot (died 1468), whose married name was Butler, alleged wife of King Edward IV of England
- Eleanor Beaufort (1431–1501), wife of James Butler, 4th Earl of Ormond
- Elizabeth Thompson (1846–1933), British painter
- Elizabeth Butler-Sloss, Baroness Butler-Sloss (born 1933)
- Lady Mary Butler (1689–1713), friend of Jonathan Swift

== See also ==
Butler dynasty
