= Lucy Wood Butler =

American pioneer temperance leader

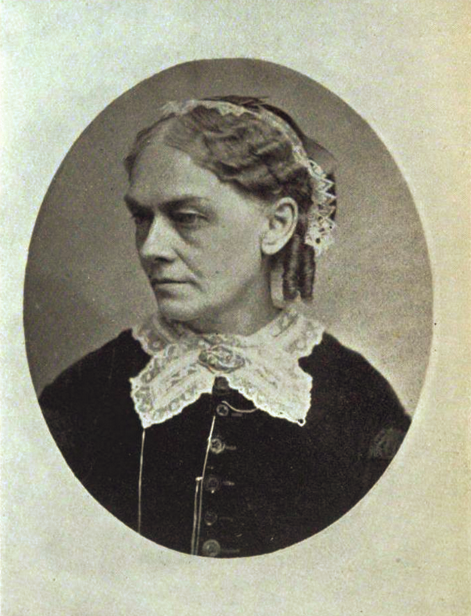
- Born: March 17, 1895. Greenbush, Rensselaer County, New York, U.S.
- Died: March 17, 1895 (aged 75)

Lucy Wood Butler (also known as Mrs. Allen Butler; February 18, 1820 – March 17, 1895) was a 19th-century American pioneer temperance leader. She was the first president of the Woman's Christian Temperance Union (W.C.T.U.) of New York. Butler's financial means enabled her to give her time to charitable works.

== Biography ==
Lucy Wood was born in Greenbush, Rensselaer County, New York, February 18, 1820.

She was educated in the public schools, and studied music at Albany, New York.

In 1841, Miss Wood married Allen Butler, and soon afterward removed, with her husband, to Syracuse, New York where she lived for more than 50 years, and was prominently identified with many charitable and benevolent institutions. She was a member of the Park Presbyterian Church in that city.

Butler was always devoted to temperance work; and after organizing a local union for this purpose, which led to the first State convention of temperance women, she was elected president of the newly formed W.C.T.U., a position which she retained for five years. She was present at Cleveland, Ohio, and assisted in forming the National W.C.T.U. After serving some years as president of the State W.C.T.U., Butler was compelled by ill-health to withdraw from active work, but always remained a member of the local union and assisted in its operations.

In addition to serving as State President of the Temperance Work in her State, and Chair of the Juvenile Work for the National W.C.T.U. (1877), she was president of the Presbyterian Woman's Society of Syracuse, of the Old Ladies' Home Association, and of the Foreign Missionary Society. She led a large infant class in Sunday-school for 20 years.

Lucy Wood Butler died March 17, 1895.
