= Jason Butler =

Jason Butler may refer to:

- Jason Aalon Butler (born 1985), American singer and activist
- Jason Butler Harner (born 1970), American actor
- Jason Butler Rote (born ?), American television writer
