= Frank Butler (cricketer) =

Australian cricketer

Personal information
- Born: 13 November 1889; Brighton, Victoria, Australia
- Died: 8 May 1965 (aged 75); Melbourne, Australia

Domestic team information
- Years: Team
- 1914/15: Canterbury
- 1921-1924: Tasmania
- Source: Cricinfo, 24 January 2016

Frank Butler (13 November 1889 – 8 May 1965) was an Australian cricketer. He played one first-class match for Canterbury in 1914/15 and three matches for Tasmania between 1921 and 1924.

== See also ==
- List of Tasmanian representative cricketers
