= James Butler (Bible scholar) =

James Butler was a pioneer of the Bible College movement in Adelaide, South Australia, and was the joint founding Superintendent of the Adelaide Bible Institute (now Bible College of South Australia) with his brother-in-law Sam Barrett.

== Biography ==
James Butler was born to Richard Butler and Sybella Butler, a couple who had emigrated from Grendon Underwood, Buckinghamshire, to Adelaide in 1881. Richard Butler was an umbrella maker, cutlery sharpener of scissors and knives, and china restorer by trade, and established a shop in the Adelaide Arcade. James joined his father and the family traded as Richard Butler and Sons. James and his wife Annie had five children; Rowland, Clifford, Colin, Verna and Ruth. Rowland (1905–1971) was a missionary to China with the China Inland Mission in 1928. Clifford and Colin continued to operate their father's business, which by 1947 included a doll's hospital.

"Hope Lodge", Belair, the first Bible training institute in Australia, was founded by (Presbyterian) Rev. W. Lockhart Morton. Thanks to the generosity of J. H. Angas, Morton was able to rent Whinham College, North Adelaide, renamed Angas College, as an evangelical college for ladies, modeled on Moody Bible Institute and influenced by missionary Hudson Taylor. "Hope Lodge" became a subsidiary college for young men, superintended by Canon Digby Marsh Berry. (Note: Berry, born around 1849 in Trowbridge, the son of an English clergyman, was educated at Wimborne and Trowbridge grammar schools, then took his MA at Magdalen College, Oxford. He was a tutor at St John's Hall, Highbury for five years, then for three years cathedral chaplain at Mauritius before leaving for Melbourne, Victoria sometime around 1892. He returned to Melbourne in 1904 and left for South Africa in 1907. A highly divisive figure, he was the author of the anti-Catholic pamphlet Pope and Kaiser, Is Rome pro-German? He died sometime before 1938.) In 1905 Butler's sister Laura married Sam Barrett, a graduate of Angas College. Butler and Barrett became close friends, thoroughly committed to the evangelical cause. Angas College closed in 1916 and the army took possession of the site for a repatriation hospital.

In 1920, with Angas College closed and prospects for the recently established Chapman-Alexander Bible Institute looking dim, Butler and Barrett inaugurated Monday evening Bible classes which developed into the Adelaide Bible Institute in 1924. The two continued as joint superintendents until the establishment of a residential college at Payneham in 1949. In 1962 the college relocated to Mount Breckan.

== Sources ==
- Calvert, John David (2000), A History of the Adelaide Bible Institute
