= Benjamin Butler (disambiguation) =

Benjamin Butler (1818–1893) was an American Civil War general and politician.

Benjamin Butler may also refer to:

- Benjamin Franklin Butler (lawyer) (1795–1858), American lawyer who served as U.S. Attorney General
- Benjamin Butler (artist) (born 1975), American artist
- Ben Butler (footballer) (died 1916), English professional footballer
- Ben Butler (engineer), British Formula One and motorsports engineer
