= Charles Butler (cricketer) =

Tasmanian-Australian cricket player

Charles William Butler (18 September 1854 – 10 June 1937) played first-class cricket for Tasmania in six matches over a 26-year period from 1872–73 to 1898–99. He was born in Hobart, Tasmania and died there as well.

In 1874, the great English cricketer W. G. Grace stayed with the Butler family while on a cricket tour of Australia and Charles Butler became a friend: Grace named his third son Charles Butler Grace after Butler. Butler went into the legal profession, like his father, who was also called Charles Butler, and at his death was reckoned as "one of the best known legal men in Tasmania".

== Cricket career ==
Butler played as a right-handed middle-order batsman, but had limited success in first-class cricket, being dismissed without scoring six times in his 12 first-class innings. His highest score was 31, made in the 1877-78 match against South Australia.

In 1878, Butler travelled with the Australian team that went to England and after William Midwinter had left the tour to join Gloucestershire alongside Grace, Butler was invited to join the team, though in the event he was injured and played in only one non-first-class match, where he failed to score in either innings. Earlier in the season he had played in a couple of non-first-class matches with Grace at Newcastle upon Tyne.

In Tasmania, he played in the annual North v South and other important non-first-class matches in Tasmania from 1870 to 1902. His brother, Francis, also played first-class cricket.

== Other sports ==
Butler was also well known in Tasmania for his prowess at lawn tennis, being the Hobart champion nine times and runner-up 12 times. His wife, whom he married in 1882 and with whom he had six children, also played tennis for Tasmania against Victoria.

== See also ==
- List of Tasmanian representative cricketers
