= Edward Butler (Louisiana politician) =

American politician

Edward Butler was a state legislator who served in the Louisiana Senate.

== Biography ==
Butler was born 1842/43 in Massachusetts.

He was elected to represent Plaquemines Parish, Louisiana in the Louisiana Senate from 1870 until 1874. He also was a recorder for the parish and served as a member of the school board.

In 1871 Governor Henry C. Warmoth appointed Butler and P. B. S. Pinchback as members of a commission to find a site for a new State House.

Butler was charged with fraud in relation to his service on the school board in 1878 but was never prosecuted.

While a senator he was beaten and stabbed by a crew member of the Bannock Rock riverboat after trying to gain access to a first class cabin.

== See also ==
- African American officeholders from the end of the Civil War until before 1900
