= George Butler (cricketer, born 1900) =

English cricketer (1900–1969)

Personal information
- Full name: George Stephen Butler
- Born: 16 December 1900; Kennett, Marlborough, Wiltshire, England
- Died: 21 September 1969 (aged 68); Kingswear, Devon, England
- Batting: Right-handed

Domestic team information
- Years: Team
- 1920: Somerset
- 1930–1939: Minor Counties

Career statistics
Competition	FC
Matches	8
Runs scored	411
Batting average	29.35
100s/50s	1/3
Top score	121
Balls bowled	42
Wickets	0
Bowling average	–
5 wickets in innings	–
10 wickets in match	–
Best bowling	0/9
Catches/stumpings	7/–
- Source: CricketArchive, 22 December 2015

George Stephen Butler (16 December 1900 at Marlborough, Wiltshire – 21 September 1969 at Kingswear, Devon), played first-class cricket for Somerset in one match in 1920 and Minor Counties cricket for Wiltshire from 1920 to 1939. While appearing for Wiltshire, he also played in seven first-class matches, mostly for teams representing the Minor Counties as a whole against touring sides in the 1930s.

Educated at Marlborough College, Butler was a right-handed opening or middle order batsman. He bowled only seven overs in first-class cricket, and his bowling style is not known, but in Minor Counties cricket he was a fairly regular bowler in his early career, sometimes opening the bowling for Wiltshire.

His one match for Somerset came against Oxford University in 1920, and he made only seven and two in a low-scoring match that was over inside two days. That was the limit of his first-class county cricket, but in 1927, having played regularly for Wiltshire, he appeared in a second first-class match, this time for a team representing "The West" against the New Zealand touring side. Butler opened the batting and scored six. His next first-class appearance was much more successful: playing for the Minor Counties against a team representing Wales in 1930, he scored 121, and this was to be his only first-class century. The Wales team consisted mainly of Glamorgan cricketers, but also included Sydney Barnes, whose penultimate first-class match this was. Wisden Cricketers' Almanack reported that Butler hit a six, a five and 15 fours and "played most enterprising cricket".

First-class matches between the teams touring England and representative Minor Counties teams became commonplace through the 1930s except in seasons when Australian teams were the tourists and Butler played in five consecutive games: in 1933, 1935, 1936, 1937 and 1939. He made more than 50 in three innings in these matches, with a top score of 84 in the 1935 match against the South Africans.

== Outside cricket ==
Butler was headmaster of Winchester Lodge preparatory school at Torquay in Devon and captained the local cricket club there.
