= Thomas Butler =

Thomas, Tommy or Tom Butler may refer to:

== Nobility and politics ==
- Thomas Butler (MP for Gloucestershire) (1358–1398), in 1397 MP for Gloucestershire
- Thomas Butler (16th-century MP) (1513–1579) for Lancashire
- Thomas Butler (Louisiana politician) (1785–1847), congressman from Louisiana
- Thomas B. Butler (1806–1873), chief justice of the Connecticut Supreme Court, and U.S. congressman from Connecticut
- Thomas S. Butler (1855–1928), U.S. congressman from Pennsylvania, father of Marine Corps general Smedley Butler
- Thomas Butler, 7th Earl of Ormond (c. 1426–1515), Irish nobleman
- Thomas Butler, 10th Earl of Ormond (c. 1531–1614), lord treasurer of Ireland
- Thomas Butler, 6th Earl of Ossory (1634–1680), Lord Deputy of Ireland
- Sir Thomas Butler, 3rd Baronet (died 1704), Irish MP for County Carlow 1692–1704
- Thomas Butler, 6th Viscount Ikerrin (1683–1719), Irish nobleman
- Sir Thomas Butler, 6th Baronet (1735–1772), Irish MP for County Carlow 1761–1768, and Portarlington
- Tom Butler (Alabama politician) (born 1944), American politician in the Alabama Senate
- Thomas Bothwell Butler (1866–1931), lieutenant governor of South Carolina
- Thomas Butler, 1st Baron Cahir (died 1558), Irish peer
- Thomas Butler, 2nd Baron Cahir (before 1568–1626/7)
- Thomas Butler, 3rd Baron Cahir
- Thomas Butler, Viscount Thurles (died 1619)
- Thomas Butler, 1st Baron Dunboyne (1271–1329)
- Thomas Butler (Australian politician) (1875–1937), member of the Tasmanian Parliament
- Thomas H. Butler (1819–1889), American politician, soldier, attorney, and engineer
- Tom Butler (Australian politician) (1929–2006), member of the Western Australian parliament
- Tom Butler (Oregon politician) (born 1946), former Oregon state representative
- Sir Thomas Butler, 1st Baronet (c. 1578–1642), Irish nobleman
- Sir Thomas Butler, 12th Baronet (1910–1994), Irish soldier

== Sports ==
- Thomas Butler (athlete) (1871–1928), British tug of war competitor
- Thomas Butler (footballer) (born 1981), Irish footballer
- Thomas Butler (bobsleigh) (born 1932), American bobsledder
- Tom Butler (cyclist) (1877–1942), Canadian-born cyclist who represented USA
- Tom Butler (footballer) (died 1923), English football player
- Tom Butler (hurler) (1902–1984), Irish hurler
- Thomas Butler (Paralympic swimmer) (1913–1963), Australian Paralympic swimmer
- Tommy Butler (hurler) (1951–2020), Irish hurler
- Tommy Butler (footballer) (1918–2009), English professional footballer

== Other ==
- Thomas Butler (judge) (died after 1496), Irish judge who held the office of Irish Master of the Rolls
- Thomas Butler (soldier) (1748–1805), Continental Army officer during the American Revolution
- Thomas Adair Butler (1836–1901), English recipient of the Victoria Cross
- Thomas Ambrose Butler (1837–1897), Irish-American priest and author
- Thomas C. Butler (born 1939/1940), American scientist of infectious diseases
- Thomas Harrison Butler (1871–1945), British ophthalmologist and amateur boat designer
- Thomas Dacres Butler (1845–1937), British Army officer and civil servant
- Thomas Langford Butler (1789–1880), American Army officer and state legislator
- Thomas O'Brien Butler (1861–1915), Irish composer
- Tom Butler (bishop) (born 1940), Bishop of Southwark, England
- Tom Butler (actor) (born 1951), Canadian actor
- Tommy Butler (1915–1970), detective who investigated the 1963 Great Train Robbery
- Thomas Butler of Garryricken (died 1738), Irish Jacobite soldier

== See also ==
- Butler baronets
