= Arthur Butler =

Arthur Butler may refer to:

- Art Butler (1887–1984), American baseball infielder
- Arthur Butler (bishop) (1912–1991), Irish clergyman
- Arthur Butler (historian) (1872–1949), Australian military historian and soldier
- Arthur Butler (rugby league) (1883–1947), Australian rugby league footballer
- Arthur Butler (rugby union)
- Arthur Gardiner Butler (1844–1925), English entomologist
- Arthur Gray Butler (1831–1909), English academic and cleric
- Arthur H. Butler (1903–1972), Marine Corps Major general and Navy Cross recipient
- Arthur John Butler (1844–1910), English scholar
- Arthur Pierce Butler (1866–?), American teacher and educational administrator
- Arthur Butler, 4th Marquess of Ormonde (1849–1943)
- Arthur Butler, 6th Marquess of Ormonde (1893–1971)
- Artie Butler (born 1942), American popular music arranger
- C. Arthur Butler (1902–1980), Australian aviation businessman
