= Edward Butler (cricketer, born 1883) =

Australian cricketer

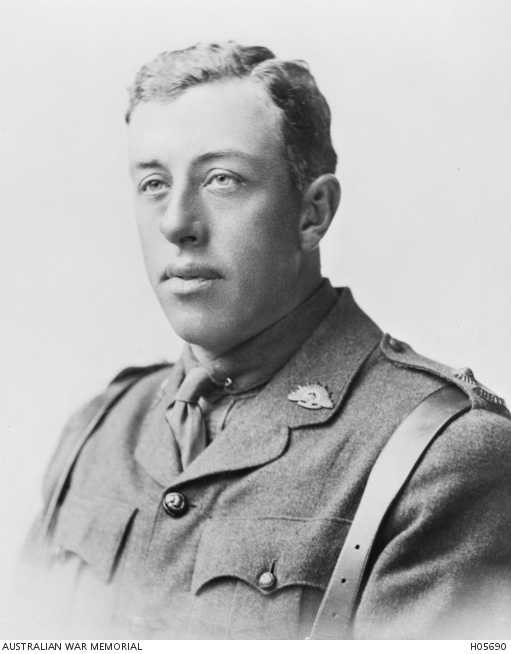
- Photograph of Butler

Personal information
- Full name: Edward Lionel Austin Butler
- Born: 10 April 1883; Hobart, Tasmania, Australia
- Died: 23 August 1916 (aged 33); Puchevillers, France

Domestic team information
- Years: Team
- 1913-1915: Tasmania
- Source: Cricinfo, 23 January 2016

Edward Butler (10 April 1883 – 23 August 1916) was an Australian cricketer. He played two first-class matches for Tasmania between 1913 and 1915. He was killed in action during World War I. His uncle, Francis Butler, also played first-class cricket.

== See also ==
- List of Tasmanian representative cricketers
- List of cricketers who were killed during military service
