= Matthew Butler (disambiguation) =

Matthew Butler was a military commander and politician.

Matthew Butler may also refer to:

- Matthew Butler (American football) (born 1999), American football player
- Matthew Butler (born 1974), child performer who appeared on Saturday morning children's show Tiswas
- Matthew E. Butler, visual effects supervisor
