= Bert Butler (footballer, born 1915) =

Australian rules footballer

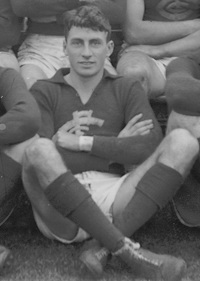
- Butler during his Carlton career

Personal information
- Full name: Bert Butler
- Born: 11 April 1915
- Died: 27 January 1999 (aged 83)
- Original team: Melton
- Height: 173 cm (5 ft 8 in)
- Weight: 73 kg (161 lb)

Playing career^{1}
Years	Club	Games (Goals)
1935–1938, 1941, 1944	Carlton	25 (15)
- ^{1} Playing statistics correct to the end of 1944.

Bert Butler (11 April 1915 – 27 January 1999) was an Australian rules footballer who played for the Carlton Football Club in the Victorian Football League (VFL).
