= Samuel Butler =

Samuel Butler may refer to:

- Samuel Butler (poet) (1613–1680), English poet and satirist
- Samuel Butler (schoolmaster) (1774–1839), English classical scholar
- Samuel Butler (politician) (1825–1891), American politician
- Samuel Butler (novelist) (1835–1902), English author of Erewhon
- Samuel Butler (cricketer) (1850–1903), English cricketer
- Samuel Butler (lawyer) (1930–2025), American lawyer
- Sam Butler (footballer, born 1986), Australian rules footballer for West Coast
- Sam Butler (footballer, born 2003), Australian rules footballer for Hawthorn
- Bo Weavil Jackson (fl. 1926), blues singer and guitarist also known as Sam Butler
