= Charles C. Butler =

American judge

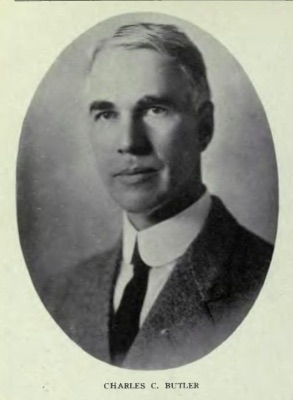

Justice of the Colorado Supreme Court
- In office 1926–1937

Chief justice of the Colorado Supreme Court
- In office 1935–1936

Personal details
- Born: Charles Cicero Butler; February 6, 1865 Milwaukee, Wisconsin, US
- Died: November 16, 1946 (aged 81) Denver, Colorado, US
- Party: Republican
- Spouse: Emma Allen
- Education: University of Michigan
- Occupation: Justice and chief justice

Charles Cicero Butler (February 6, 1865 – November 16, 1946) was an attorney who began practicing law in 1891. Within one year he became a deputy district attorney and then was a district court judge. He served as a justice and the chief justice in the Colorado Supreme Court. Butler served as president of the Teller County and Denver Bar Associations and was vice president of the Colorado Bar Association.

== Early life and education ==
Charles Cicero Butler was born on February 6, 1865, to Washington Irving and Henrietta Comstock Butler in Milwaukee, Wisconsin. (Note: Henrietta and Washington I. Butler were married January 11, 1864. Henrietta Comstock was born September 12, 1838 in Worthington Ohio. She was the daughter of Cicero and Charlotte G. Stiles Comstock. The family moved to Milwaukee, Wisconsin. Her father was the City Comptroller, a State senator and the inventor of "Comstock’s Rotary Spader".) His father, born in New York, was a lawyer who lived in New York and Wisconsin. In 1868, he moved to New York City and practiced law until his death in 1885. His mother was born in Ohio. Butler was an only child. He worked in a bank. In 1887, he traveled to Gilpin County, Colorado, where he worked as a miner. He then moved to Denver, where he studied law under Robert Collier.

He graduated from the University of Michigan Law School with a Bachelor of Laws (LLB) degree in 1891. He was a member of the Phi Delta Phi fraternity. The same year, he was admitted to the bar in Colorado. He received an honorary Doctor of Law LLD from the University of Denver in 1925. He also received a degree from the University of Colorado.

== Career ==
In 1892, Butler was made a deputy district attorney for the Colorado district courts. He moved to Cripple Creek in 1895 and was appointed deputy district attorney in 1904. He was deputy district attorney in Teller and Arapahoe Counties. In 1908, he moved to Denver, and he practiced law there until 1912. He specialized in mining law.

Butler was elected judge of the Denver district court in 1912, 1918, and 1924, serving from 1913 to 1927. Butler, a Republican, served on the Executive Committee and was the Chairman of the Administration of Criminal Justice Committee. While running for District Judge in 1924, he qualified as both a Republican and a Democratic candidate.

He was a justice of the Colorado Supreme Court from 1926 to 1936, serving as Chief Justice from 1935 to 1936. He was again a deputy district attorney in 1937 and 1938, and he retired in 1938.

He was a member of the Teller County Bar Association and was the president of the organization for two terms. He was a member of the Denver Bar Association and was the president of the organization in 1925. He was the first vice president of the Colorado Bar Association and served two terms as its president. He was a member of the American Bar Association and the American Judicature Society. He was also a member of the Masonic Temple. He had an office in the Colorado State Capitol Building in Denver.

== Personal life ==
He married Emma Allen on June 5, 1901, in Cripple Creek. (Note: They were also said to have been married in 1911.) She was the daughter of Rhodes Allen who settled in Sherman County, Kansas. The Butlers had three children Opal Virginia, Leonard B. (born 1901), and Allen G. Butler (born 1908).

He suffered a stroke and died on November 16, 1946, at St. Joseph Hospital in Denver. He was 81 years of age. He was buried at the Fairmount Cemetery in Denver, Colorado.
