= Marty Butler =

American politician and businessman

Member of the Illinois Senate
- In office 1991 – December 1, 1998

Personal details
- Born: Martin J. Butler; April 18, 1924 Chicago, Illinois, U.S.
- Died: December 1, 1998 (aged 74)
- Party: Republican
- Occupation: Politician, businessman

Military service
- Allegiance: United States
- Branch/service: United States Army (United States Army Air Forces)
- Battles/wars: World War II

Martin J. Butler (April 18, 1924 – December 1, 1998) was an American politician and businessman.

Born in Chicago, Illinois, Butler served in the United States Army Air Forces during World War II. He was president of the Distributors Institute, Inc. Butler lived in Park Ridge, Illinois with his wife and family. He served on the Park Ridge City Council and as mayor of Park Ridge. In 1967, Butler formed the Homeowners Party when he ran for the Park Ridge City Council.

Butler, as Maine Township Republican Committeeman, appointed himself to the vacancy left by Kustra's resignation. Butler served in the Illinois Senate, as a Republican from 1991 until his death in 1998. Butler died of a heart attack. Dave Sullivan, an aide to Governor George Ryan, was appointed as Butler's successor.
