= Archie Butler (footballer) =

Australian rules footballer

Personal information
- Full name: Archibald Butler
- Born: 1 September 1879; Newstead, Victoria
- Died: 5 March 1951 (aged 71); Ferny Creek, Victoria
- Original team: Mordialloc

Playing career^{1}
Years	Club	Games (Goals)
1903	South Melbourne	2 (0)
- ^{1} Playing statistics correct to the end of 1903.

Archibald Butler (1 September 1879 – 5 March 1951) was an Australian rules footballer who played for the South Melbourne Football Club in the Victorian Football League (VFL).
