= Francis Butler (dog trainer) =

Francis Butler (1810–1874) was an American author, veterinarian, and dog trainer, who lived in New York City until his death. His success with the training and control of dogs is said to have been remarkable. He was the first recorded owner of a Great Dane in the United States.

Butler was originally from England and moved to the USA around age 32. Among other occupations, he held the post of Professor of the French Language at the Brooklyn Female Academy, and a similar post at another school in Flushing. As such, he was quite the linguist.

Butler, his wife, and family owned several acres of land around their home in Brooklyn, where Mr. Butler ran his dog-veterinary business.

He died at age 64 from hydrophobia, rabies, given to him from a bite on the thumb by a dog he had treated six weeks earlier. He was survived by his wife and nine children.

== Noted books ==
- Dogography
- Spanish Teacher
- French Speaker
- Breeding, Training, Management, and Diseases of Dogs
- Butler's Poetical Sketches
