= Edward Albert Butler =

British entomologist

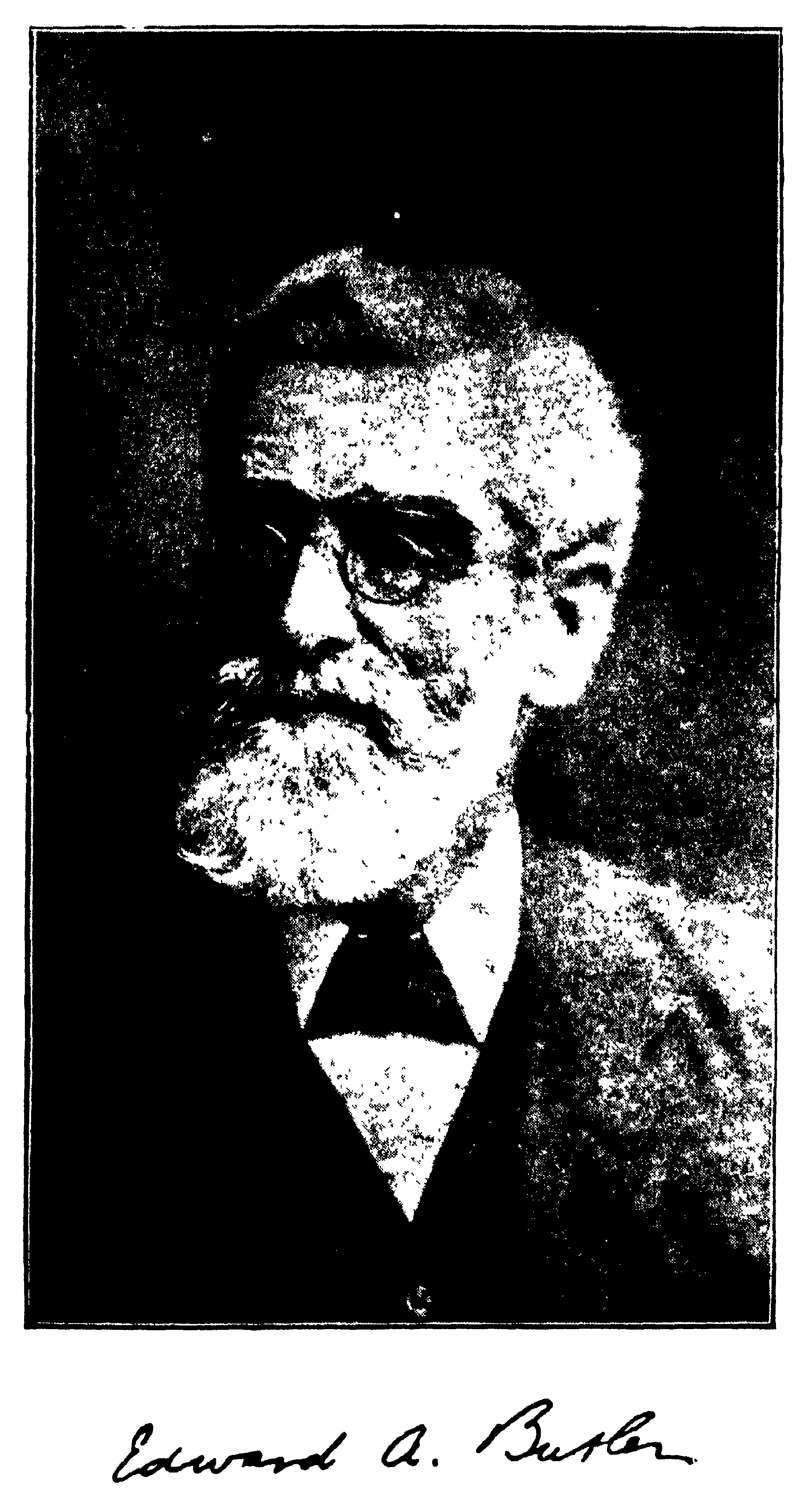

Edward Albert Butler (17 March 1845 – 20 November 1925, Clapham) was a British entomologist who specialized in the life histories of the Hemiptera. He was also a popularizer of entomology and was the author of several books.

Born in Alton, Hants, he became interested at a young age in natural history through his father. He studied at St Leonard's before going to school and then went to Ramsgate. Matriculating from London University, he became an assistant teacher at West Hill House, Hastings, in 1865 becoming vice principal later. He received a BA in 1870 and a BSc in 1872 and then became a master at University School, Hastings. His interest in entomology was sparked by Edward Saunders. He became a master at Tollington Schools and moved to London in 1883 where he became vice principal of the Schools. He retired in 1919 to Clapham.

Butler's major contribution to entomology was on the life-histories of hemiptera. He left taxonomy and descriptions to his collaborator W.L. Distant.

He married Lucy Porter in 1877 and they had a son and four daughters. He later became an authority on the Hemiptera. His collections of specimens were deposited in the Natural History Museum in London.
