= Ignacia Bordallo Butler =

Chamorro businesswoman

- Citizenship: United States
- Organization(s): Butler, Inc.
- Spouse: Chester Butler

Ignacia Bordallo Butler (died 1993) was a Chamorro businesswoman and entrepreneur from Guam who introduced Coca-Cola to the island with her husband Chester Butler.

== Biography ==
Ignacia was the daughter of Baltazar Bordallo, a Spanish immigrant to Guam, and Pangelinan from the village of Sumay. She attended high school in the Philippines and returned to Guam at the age of 17. A year later, Ignacia married Chester Butler, a sailor from Fort Worth, Texas. The two moved to Hagåtña, where they started a dry goods store called Butler's Emporium in 1936. The business specialized in bringing in goods that were previously not available in Guam, especially soft drinks like Coca-Cola. When Chester Butler was taken to Japan as a prisoner of war during World War II, Ignacia continued running the store throughout the Japanese occupation, as well as another store, a warehouse, and a movie theater. She also resisted the Japanese occupiers by hiding the emporium's goods and keeping radio operators in touch with American news outlets to keep them updated on the situation in Guam.

Despite Butler's Emporium being destroyed by American bombardments of the island in 1944, family land being seized for use as military installations, and Chester passing away from pancreatic cancer in 1952, Ignacia reconsolidated the business and kept operating it in the post-war years. She moved to its current location in Sinajana and reincorporated it as Butler, Inc. Ignacia continued to operate the business until her retirement in 1982, when she moved to California, where she lived until she died in 1993 at the age of 95.

== Legacy ==
Ignacia was inducted into the Guam Business Hall of Fame in 1996 and was recognized as the "Grandlady of Business" on the 100th anniversary of Butler, Inc. in 2015. A photo exhibit was opened at the Guam Congress Building in 2019 that focused on women in Guam's history which included Ignacia Butler, and she was also featured in a book on the same topic titled Famalao’an Guahan: Women in Guam History.
