= Fred Butler (cricketer) =

English cricketer

Frederick Butler (29 December 1857 – 26 February 1923) was an English first-class cricketer active 1881–90 who played for Nottinghamshire. He was born in Radcliffe-on-Trent; died in Staten Island.
