= Anne Butler (engineer) =

President for Engineers Ireland

Regina Moran
- Education: University College Galway; Trinity College, Dublin

Anne Butler CEng. FIEI served as president for Engineers Ireland in 2005. She was only the second woman to hold this position. Butler was a founding director of the Environmental Protection Agency in Ireland.

== Biography ==
Anne Butler grew up in Kilkelly, County Mayo. She studied Civil Engineering in University College Galway in 1976. Butler went on to complete a MSc in Structural Engineering in 1977 and then a Diploma in Environmental Engineering in 1990 from Trinity College, Dublin. Butler has become a chartered Engineer. She went on to be President of the Institution of Engineers of Ireland. Butler was a founding Director of the Environmental Protection Agency (EPA) in Ireland and remained on its board for ten years. Butler is on the Board of the ESB Group and on the Governing Body of the Dublin Institute of Technology. Butler was awarded the TBD Alumni Award for her contribution to the field of "Engineering, IT and Mathematics". Butler is also a member of the Irish Academy of Engineering.
