= Lee Pierce Butler =

American academic

- Born: December 19, 1884; Clarendon Hills, Illinois
- Died: March 28, 1953 (aged 68); Burlington, North Carolina
- Occupation: Librarian
- Known for: Professor at the University of Chicago Graduate Library School

Lee Pierce Butler (December 19, 1884 – March 28, 1953) was a professor at the University of Chicago Graduate Library School. He was one of the first to use the term "library science" (along with S. R. Ranganathan), by which he meant the scientific study of books and users, and was a leader in the new social-scientific approach to the field in the 1930s and 1940s.

Butler was born in Clarendon Hills, Illinois. A middling student at first, he earned a Ph.B in 1906 and an M.A. in Latin in 1910 from Dickinson College. He went on to study medieval church history at Hartford Theological Seminary, earning a B.D. in 1910 for "Napoleon's Attitude to Christianity and to the Roman Catholic Church" and his Ph.D. in 1912 for "Studies on the Christology of Irenaeus." He failed in parish life, but found himself a bit later. Butler worked at the Newberry Library in Chicago from 1916 to 1919, and went on to lead its John M. Wing Foundation on the History of Printing. In that position he built the collection of the Newberry into one of the great research libraries for international scholarship in the United States, through extensive international travel to acquire hard-to-find books.

In 1931, Butler became a professor of bibliographic history at the Graduate Library School (GLS) of the University of Chicago (the same year that The Library Quarterly was founded there). It is for his work there defending the new techniques of quantitative social science to questions of librarianship that he is best known. His classic articulation of these ideas is his 1933 book, An Introduction to Library Science (University of Chicago Press), the title of which introduced the idea of librarianship as a science. Among his best known students are Lester Asheim, Arna Bontemps, Rudolf Hirsch, Haynes McMullen, Jesse Shera, and Raynard Swank.

His ideas of the 1930s went against the humanistic, literary approach to librarianship (the "scholar librarian" of old) as well as the technical, procedure-based approach of "library economy" (the common term for library science of the time). The significant aspects of the GLS approach were that it employed quantitative, scientific research methods, and that it aimed to examine librarianship as a social system of communication. Librarianship, according to Butler's new definition, was the "transmission of the accumulated experience of society through the instrumentality of the book." Thus, the problems his new "library science" was intended to address were social problems of information exchange and communication in society, where library economy had been confined to addressing the practical problems of the administration of libraries. While not everyone welcomed Butler's new approach, most especially C. Seymour Thompson, it has had a permanent influence on the research agenda of the field, and the new term "library science" became the generally adopted name for the academic study of librarianship.

Late in his career, Butler recanted aspects of the GLS's scientific approach, finding it too quantitative and scientistic, and began to argue for a more humanistic or even spiritual approach. Indeed, "Librarianship had, in fact, been replaced by a pseudo-science, in Butler's opinion. Ideas were supplanted by facts, or even worse, by mere data. The field risked becoming truly anti-intellectual, lost in 'the simplicity of its pragmatism.'"
