= Piers Weld-Forester =

British motorcycle racer and sports-car driver (1946–1977)

Piers Edric Weld-Forester (23 April 1946 – 30 October 1977) was a British motorcycle road racer, sports-car driver and aristocrat. A member of the Butler of Ormonde and Forester dynasties, he was the son of Charles Robert Weld-Forester and Lady Moyra Butler, and grandson of George Butler, 5th Marquess of Ormonde. Early in his career, he co-drove a Ford GT40 in endurance racing before switching focus to motorcycles in the 1970s. He died following a crash during a Formula 750 race at Brands Hatch in October 1977.

Weld-Forester attracted press attention in 1971 as a reported boyfriend of Princess Anne. Through his maternal grandmother Sybil Butler, Marchioness of Ormonde, Piers was a first-cousin twice-removed of Sir Winston Churchill.

== Early life and family ==
Piers Edric Weld-Forester was born on 23 April 1946, the only child of Charles Weld-Forester and Lady Moyra Butler. His father the son of Major The Hon. Edric Weld-Forester (6th son of Cecil Weld-Forester, 5th Baron Forester) and Lady Victoria Weld-Forester (daughter of Charles Wynn-Carington, 1st Marquess of Lincolnshire). Piers' mother Lady Moyra Weld-Forester was the daughter of George Butler, Earl of Ossory (son of Arthur Butler, 4th Marquess of Ormonde and the American heiress Ellen Stager) and Sybil, Countess of Ossory (daughter William Fellowes, 2nd Baron de Ramsey and Lady Rosamond Spencer-Churchill).

Weld-Forester was christened on 21 July 1946 at the Church of Saint Michael and All Angels, Lambourn.

Weld-Forester's parents Lt. Charles Weld-Forester and Lady Moyra Butler had been married at St George's, Hanover Square on 30 April 1940; less than a month after their marriage Lt. Weld-Forester, who was serving in the Rifle Brigade, was taken prisoner during the defence of Calais. He was interred as a prisoner-of-war for the following five years, initially at Oflag VII-D, and later at Colditz Castle; he was eventually released in April 1945. During the war Piers' mother Lady Moyra had served as an ambulance driver in the Auxiliary Territorial Service. Following Lt. Weld-Forester's release, the couple purchased the freehold of Delamere House in Lambourn, Berkshire for £7,500 in August 1945.

Just over a year after Piers' birth his father sued his mother for divorce in late 1947, alleging that she had committed adultery with the Belgian aristocrat and sculptor Comte Guy van den Steen de Jehay; Lady Moyra did not defend the suit, and following the finalisation of the divorce in 1948 she remarried Guy Van Den Steen in London. Following their marriage, Piers' half-brother Gerard van den Steen de Jehay was born in London in 1949.

Lady Moyra moved to Belgium in 1950, where she and her husband undertook a large-scale restoration of the ancestral home of Guy's family Chateau de Jehay. Little evidence survives in relation to where Piers' childhood was spent, although a bust of Piers as a child which created by his step-father in 1950 remains in the collection held at the Chateau de Jehay. In 1959 Piers' mother Lady Moyra died in Belgium the age of 38; Piers inherited her property in the United Kingdom and Ireland, whilst his step-father and half-brother received Moyra's property in the United States, Belgium and Switzerland; in the same year Piers was sent to boarding school at Harrow in north-west London.

Piers' father Charles remarried in the early 1950's to Venetia Wills, granddaughter of tobacco millionaire Sir Ernest Wills, 3rd Baronet; the union produced Piers' half siblings Anthony Weld-Forester (b. 1955) and Mary Weld-Forester (b. 1957). In 1962, Piers father sued his second wife for adultery, following which he was granted custody of Piers' half-siblings. His father married for a third time to Robin Keith in May 1963.

=== Education ===
Piers attended Harrow School from 1959 to 1963, after which he attended the Royal Military Academy Sandhurst. In 1965 he joined the 3rd Green Jackets Brigade.

== Sporting Career ==
=== Bobsleighing ===
Weld-Forester was a close friend and colleague of drivers Barry Sheene and Steve Parrish. According to Parrish's memoirs, following their initial meeting in 1976, he used his social connections to persuade Prince Michael of Kent—then involved with the British bobsleigh set—to invite Parrish to a winter training session in Innsbruck, Austria. Parrish and Weld-Forester arrived with a borrowed sled, with Parrish driving and Weld-Forester acting as brakeman; they crashed repeatedly and were asked to leave the camp. Parrish later recalled the escapade as characteristic of Weld-Forester’s appetite for risk and of the 1970s London milieu around him.

=== Sports cars ===
Weld-Forester was active in endurance events around 1970. Photographic records from the Revs Institute show him (credited as Piers Forester) co-driving the No. 17 Ford GT40 with Andrew Hedges during the 1970 24 Hours of Daytona.

=== Motorcycle racing ===
By the mid-1970s, Weld-Forester had moved into motorcycle racing, including Formula 750 events.

== Personal life ==
Weld-Forester was briefly the boyfriend of Princess Anne in 1971. In Steve Parrish's account of the mid-1970s London racing milieu, Weld-Forester’s London townhouse, 82 Waterford Road, Chelsea home functioned as a social and networking hub for riders and sponsors. Parrish recalls first meeting Barry Sheene at Weld-Forester’s house in 1975, shortly after Sheene’s Daytona crash, and phoning advertising executive Dan Cromer the next day about potential backing from the Brut account (then associated with Henry Cooper and later Kevin Keegan).

Parrish characterises Weld-Forester as a “playboy in the true sense of the word,” with an aristorcratic background, who added motorcycle racing to his pursuits after meeting Sheene.

Parrish describes Weld-Forester’s house off the King’s Road (Waterford Road) as a large multi-storey property with a double garage where a Yamaha TZ750 was maintained, and a regular gathering place for what he calls “posh” friends, including lawyers and bankers—contacts Sheene cultivated for sponsorships. Parrish also recounts hard-partying episodes at the address (including a notorious “room seven”) and mentions occasional use of cocaine and cannabis within the circle, presented as his own recollection of the period.

Parrish later contrasts the hedonistic “room seven” era at Weld-Forester’s house with Sheene’s relationship with Stephanie McLean, noting that Sheene’s behaviour calmed markedly thereafter; he also recalls first encountering McLean at Weld-Forester’s home and in a contemporaneous magazine shoot.

=== Marriage ===
In June 1973, Weld-Forester married model Georgina Youens at the Guards Chapel, Wellington Barracks; she was the daughter of Major-General the Venerable John Youens, then Chaplain-General to the Forces. Piers' best man was The Hon. Brian Alexander (son of Field Marshal Harold Alexander, 1st Earl Alexander of Tunis).

Georgina Weld-Forester was killed the following year in the crash of Turkish Airlines Flight 981 near Paris on 3 March 1974.

=== Remainder to the Ormonde Settled Estates Trust ===
In 1938, Weld-Forester's maternal grandfather, George, Earl of Ossory, together with Piers’s uncle Viscount Thurles, re-settled the Ormonde Settled Estates Trust. Under the revised terms, if the male-line descendants of John Butler, 2nd Marquess of Ormonde became extinct, the family’s remaining settled property and associated wealth would pass to Lady Moyra Butler and her issue. This contingency arose on the death of Arthur Butler, 6th Marquess of Ormonde in 1971. The marquessate and the trust life-interest then passed to his cousin Charles Butler, 7th Marquess of Ormonde, who had no sons; under the 1938 re-settlement, Lady Moyra’s two sons—Piers and his half-brother Count Gerard van den Steen de Jehay—were next in line to the life interest. Between 1975 and 1980 negotiations proceeded to transfer the Ormonde collection of gold and silver heirlooms to the British government in lieu of estate duty, a process that required the consent of those entitled in remainder. Following Piers’s death in 1977, additional steps were taken in Belgium to locate and notify Count Gerard as remainderman so that the necessary court orders could be obtained to complete the transfer.

Following the 1967 transfer of Kilkenny Castle to local authorities, the remaining balance of the Ormonde Settled Estates Trust was wound up and divided equally between Arthur Butler (6th Marquess) and the next two heirs under the terms of the 1938 resettlement: Charles Butler (later 7th Marquess), and Piers.

== Name and credits ==
Weld-Forester’s surname sometimes appears without the hyphen and occasionally as Piers Forester in race records and captions. Contemporary photo-agency captions from 1972 also identify him as a motorcyclist and as “a former boyfriend of Princess Anne.”

== Death and legacy ==
Weld-Forester was killed in a motorcycle crash on 30 October 1977 at Brands Hatch after falling from his 750 Yamaha and sliding into the Armco at Clearways, in front of fellow rider Julian Seddon. About an hour earlier, Weld-Forester had reportedly told Barry Sheene that he had taken pole position for his race. Parrish describes him as a capable club-level rider whose personal goal was to win at Brands Hatch, rather than to pursue world championships.

Weld-Forester's estate was valued at £82,395 for probate.

Weld-Forester is included in retrospective press coverage of Princess Anne’s early escorts and in photographic and statistical archives for period sports-car and motorcycle racing.
