= Elie Lainé =

French landscape architect

Elie Lainé (1829–1911) was a French landscape architect, chiefly remembered for the restoration of the gardens at Vaux-le-Vicomte, the layout of the grounds at Waddesdon Manor and the creation of numerous parks and gardens for King Leopold II of Belgium.

== Biographical information ==
Lainé was born in 1829 in the northern French town of Brain-sur-l'Authion in Maine-et-Loire, where most of his family were small-scale farmers. He worked as a gardener in the nearby town of Angers in his twenties. Once he was established as a landscape architect, he set up his home and studio in the Petit-Montrouge area of Paris, and lived there between 1879 and 1898. Lainé never married, and retired to a grand house he designed in his home town, Brain-sur-l'Authion, where he died in 1911, aged 82.

== Projects in England and France ==
His first project of note as a landscape architect was for Ferdinand de Rothschild, whose home at Waddesdon Manor in Buckinghamshire, England, was designed by the Parisian architect Hippolyte Destailleur. Lainé worked at Waddesdon for at least eleven years, laying out roads, terraces and plantations of mature trees, and helping turn the site from a wild, muddy hill into one of the finest gardens in England.

At Vaux-le-Vicomte in Seine-et-Marne, Lainé was employed by the new owner of the chateau, Alfred Sommier, from about 1876 to restore the classical gardens originally designed by Andre Le Nôtre in the mid-17th century. While Hippolyte Destailleur led the restoration of the chateau, Lainé worked on the grounds, which had lain abandoned for many years. He laid miles of pipes so that 20 of the grand water features could work again, and raised the level of the entire garden by some 20 cm so he could add fresh topsoil. By 1891, the French press was hailing the gardens (with their pools, canals, cascade, fountains, terraces, statues and magnificent hornbeam hedges) as being fully restored to their original state.

Lainé worked for other private clients in France: from 1881 he laid out the grounds of the Château d'Armainvilliers in Seine-et-Marne for Edmond de Rothschild, creating a park that the family remembered as "particularly awe-inspiring and a great luxury" and he designed the garden and grounds for Baron Eugene Roger at La Triboulette in Vouzeron, Cher (1887).

== Belgian projects ==
From 1889, Lainé worked for Leopold II, having been recommended to the Belgian king by Ferdinand de Rothschild. His designs included the neoclassical gardens at the Palace of the Colonies (now the Royal Museum for Central Africa) in Tervuren, created for the 1897 Brussels World's Fair; the naturalistic Woluwe Park in Brussels; the grounds of the Royal Castle of Ardenne; and the Royal Castle of Ciergnon and Villers-sur-Lesse in the south of the country. He produced a master plan for Ostend, the king's summer home on the Belgian coast, and also designed the grounds of various villas owned by the king in the south of France. His last known project was in 1905, at Jenneret Park in the Ardennes, for Baron Paul-Louis de Favereau, the king's foreign secretary.

== Legacy ==
An obituary described Lainé as "the celebrated Parisian landscape architect." Many of his projects still exist a hundred years after his death, but very few of his plans and other papers have survived. In the early part of the 21st century, his name became confused with the unrelated Vendéen architect Emile Lainé (1863–1930), who has therefore wrongly received much of the credit for Elie Lainé's work in Brussels.

== Gallery of projects ==
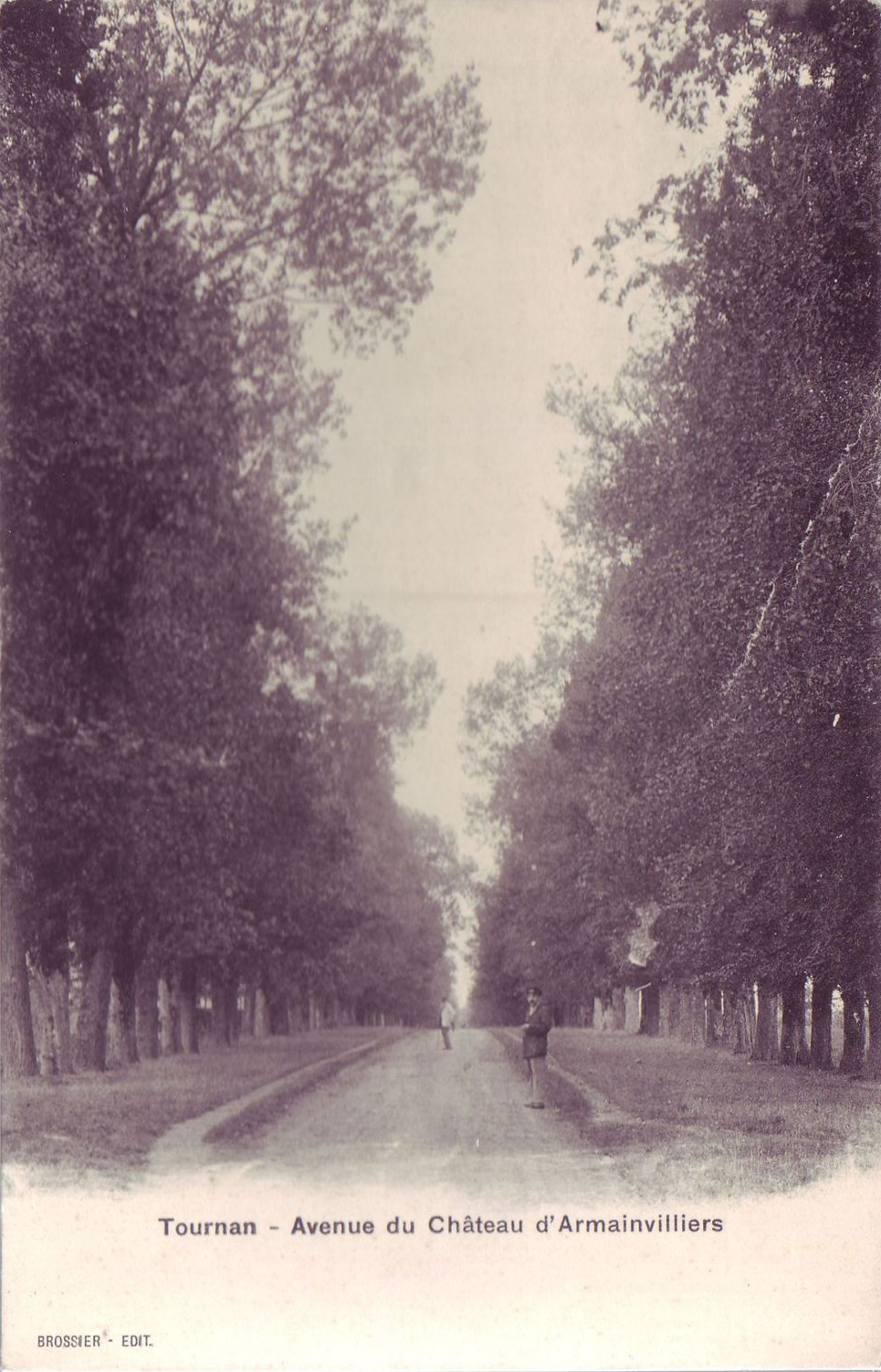
Avenue du Château d'Armainvilliers

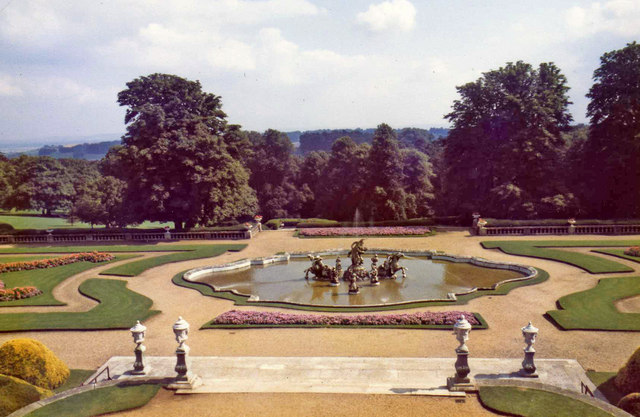
Part of the gardens at Waddesdon Manor

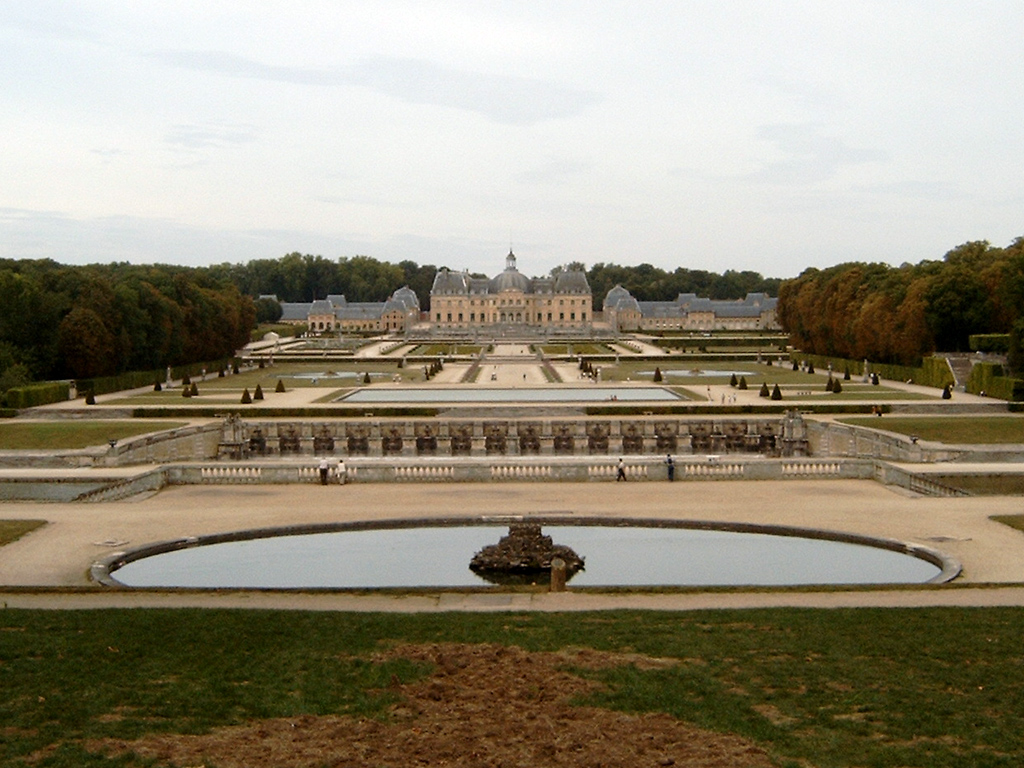
The restored gardens at Vaux-le-Vicomte

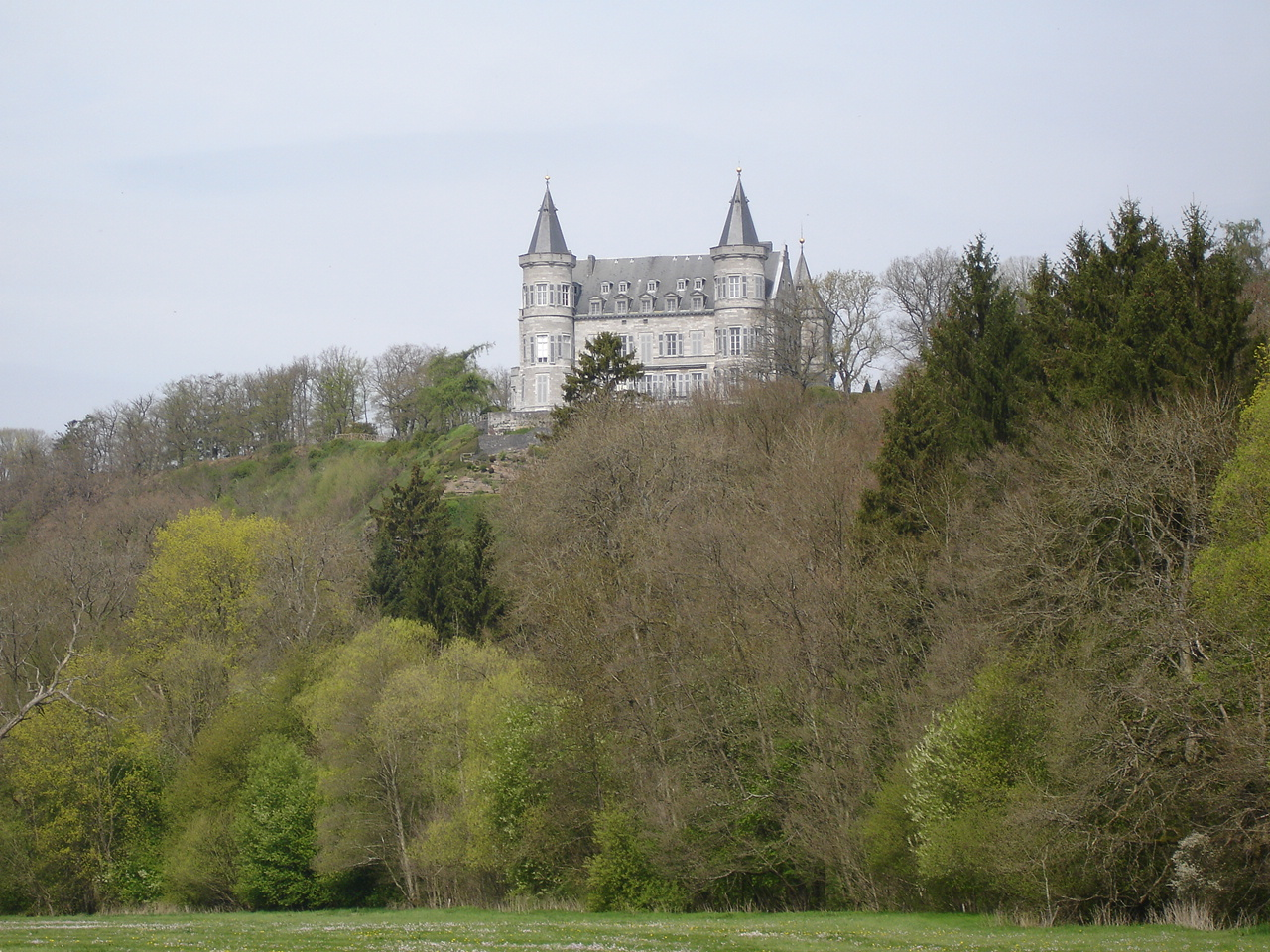
Royal Castle of Ciergnon in the Ardennes

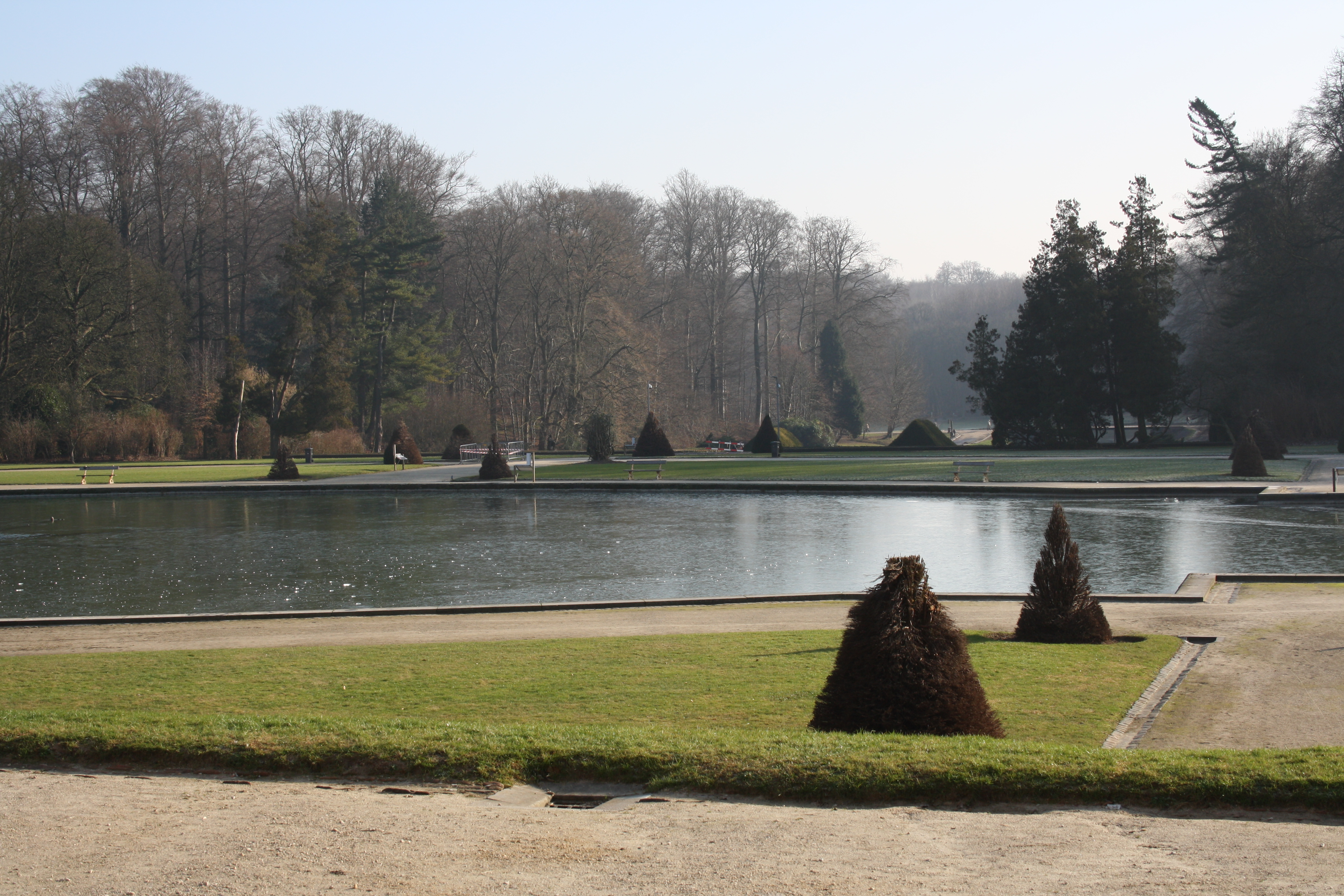
Part of the classical garden at Tervuren

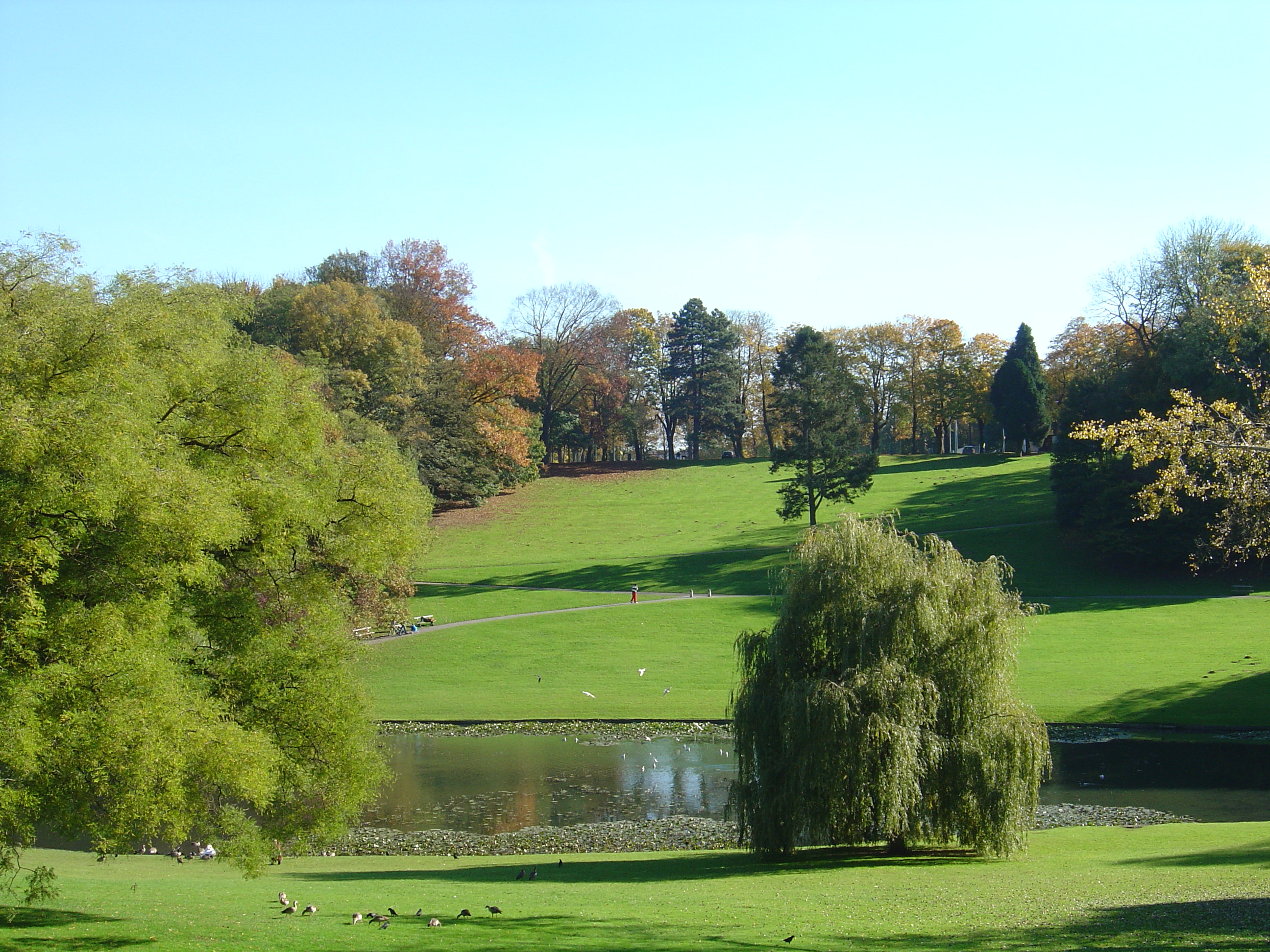
Woluwe Park in Brussels

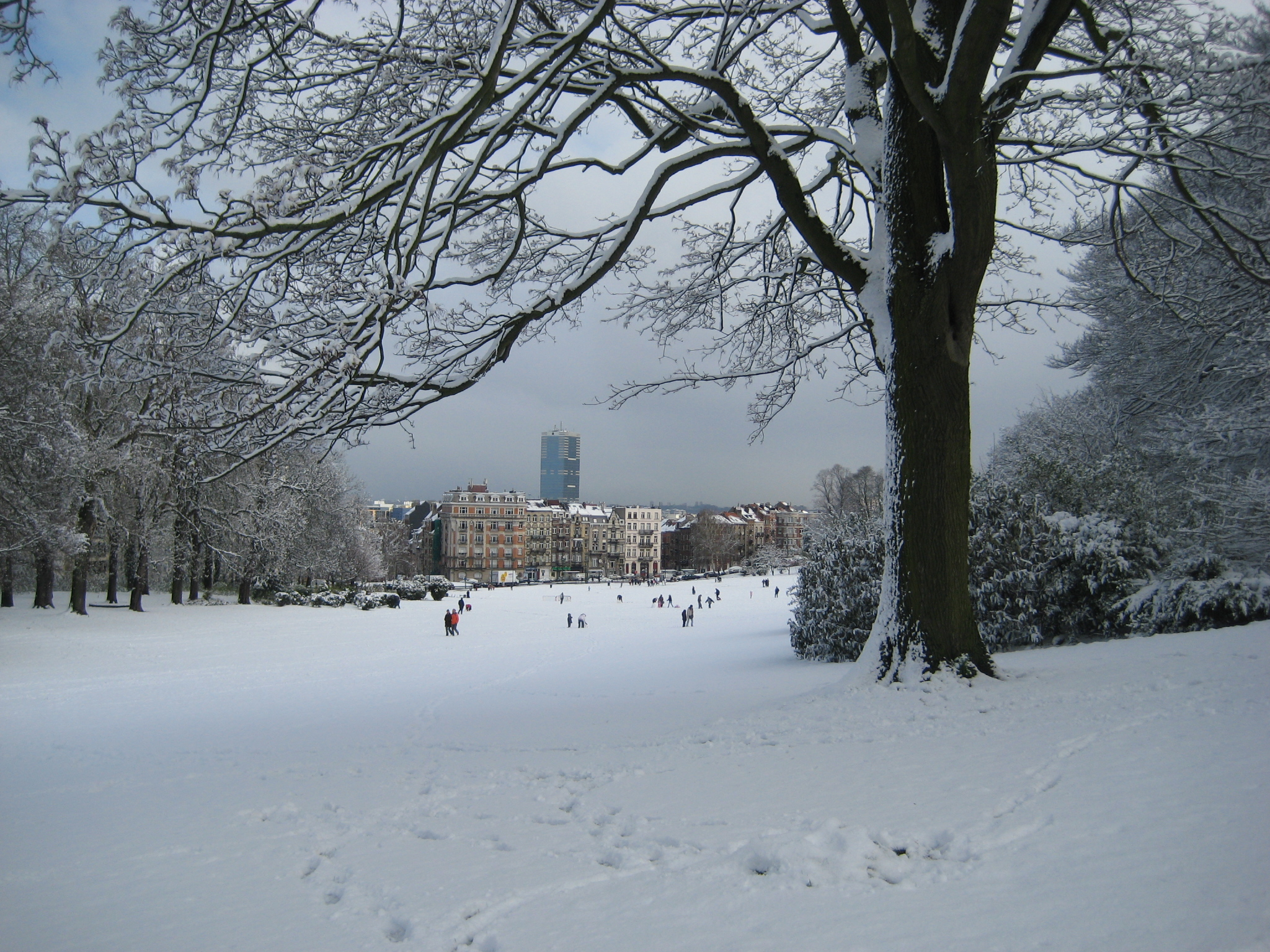
Forest Park in Brussels

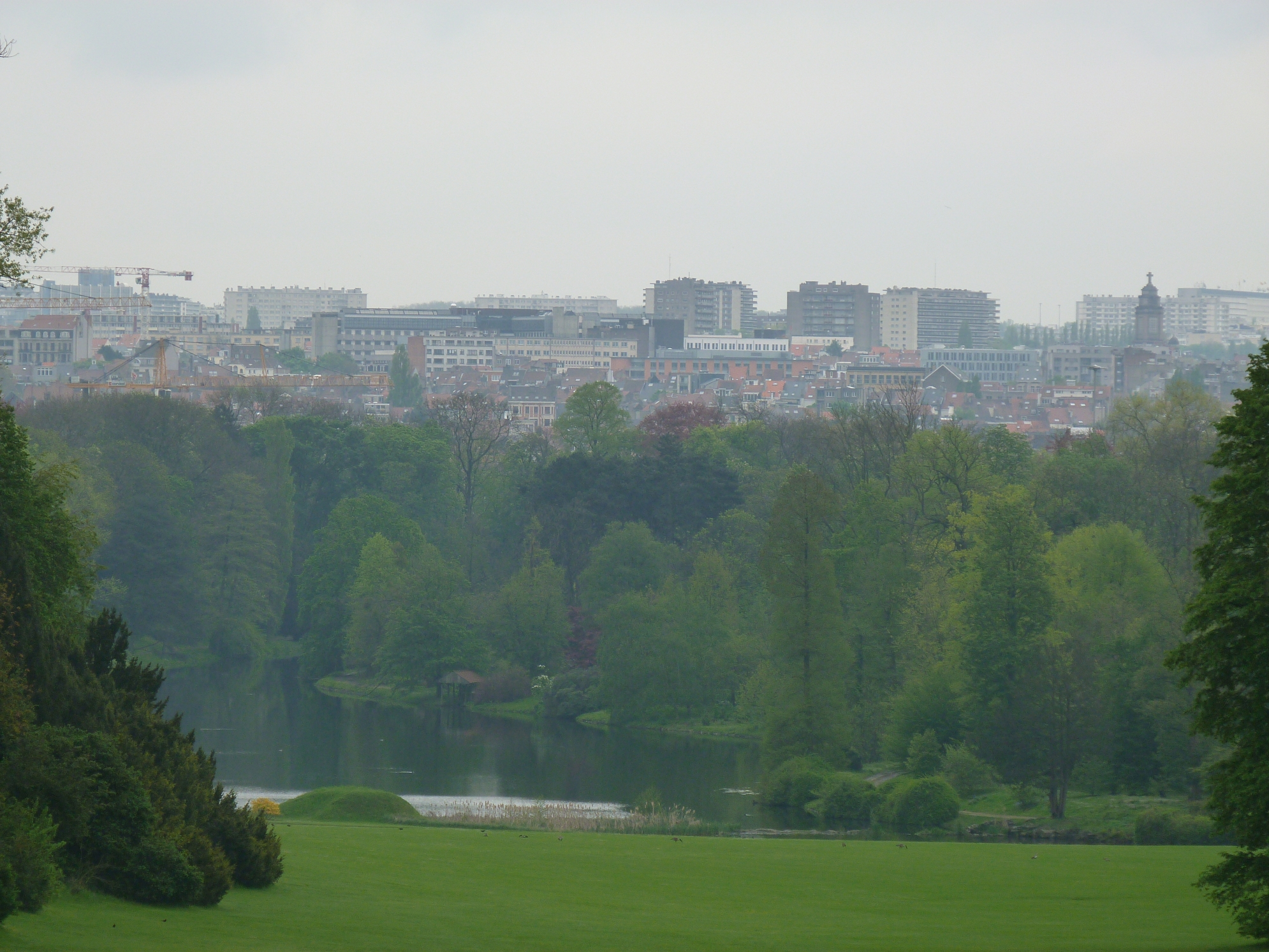
Royal Domain of Laeken in Brussels

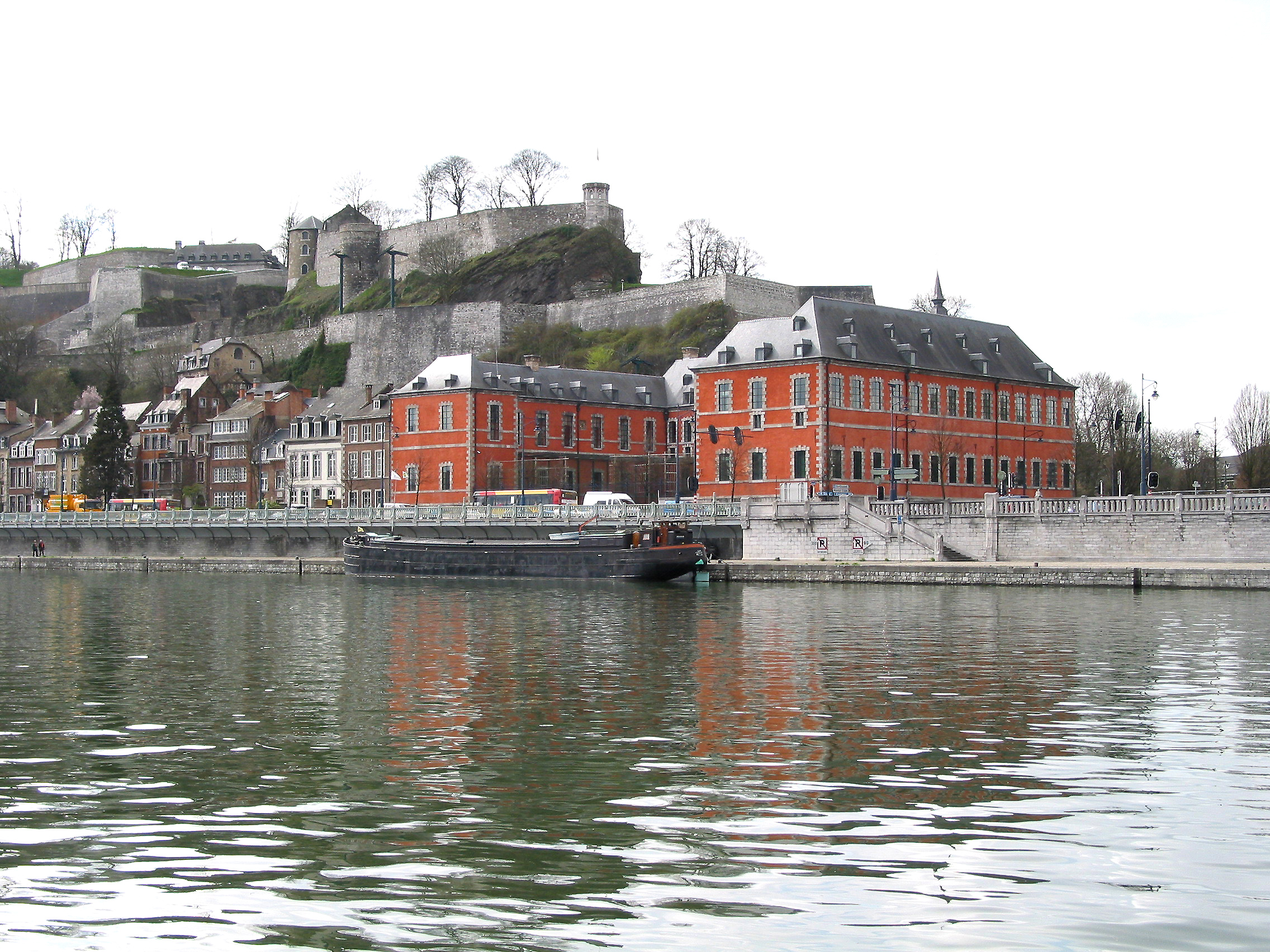
Circulation routes at the Citadel of Namur

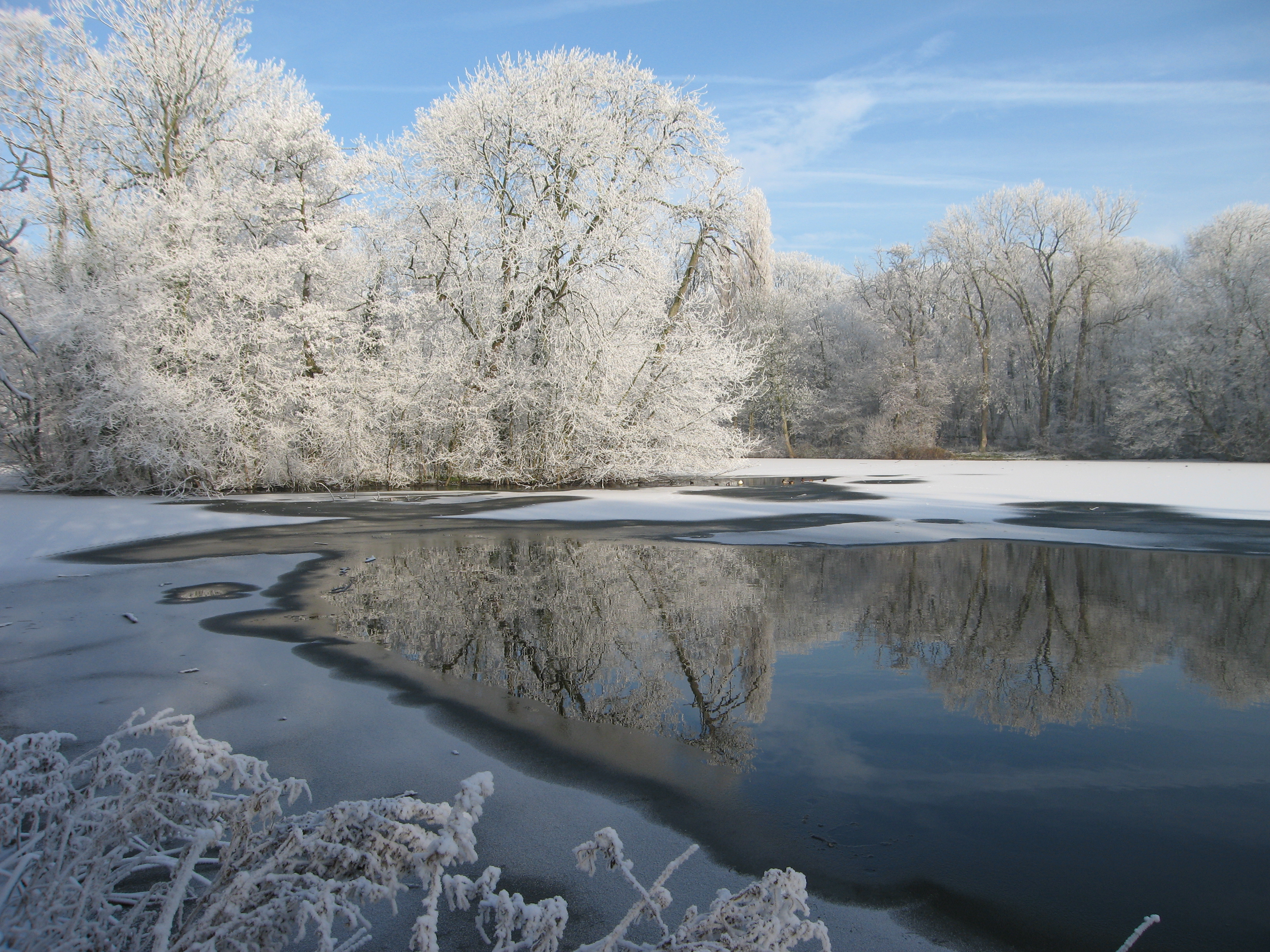
Maria Hendrikapark in Ostend
