= Gochenée =

Gochenée Gochnêye (Walloon)
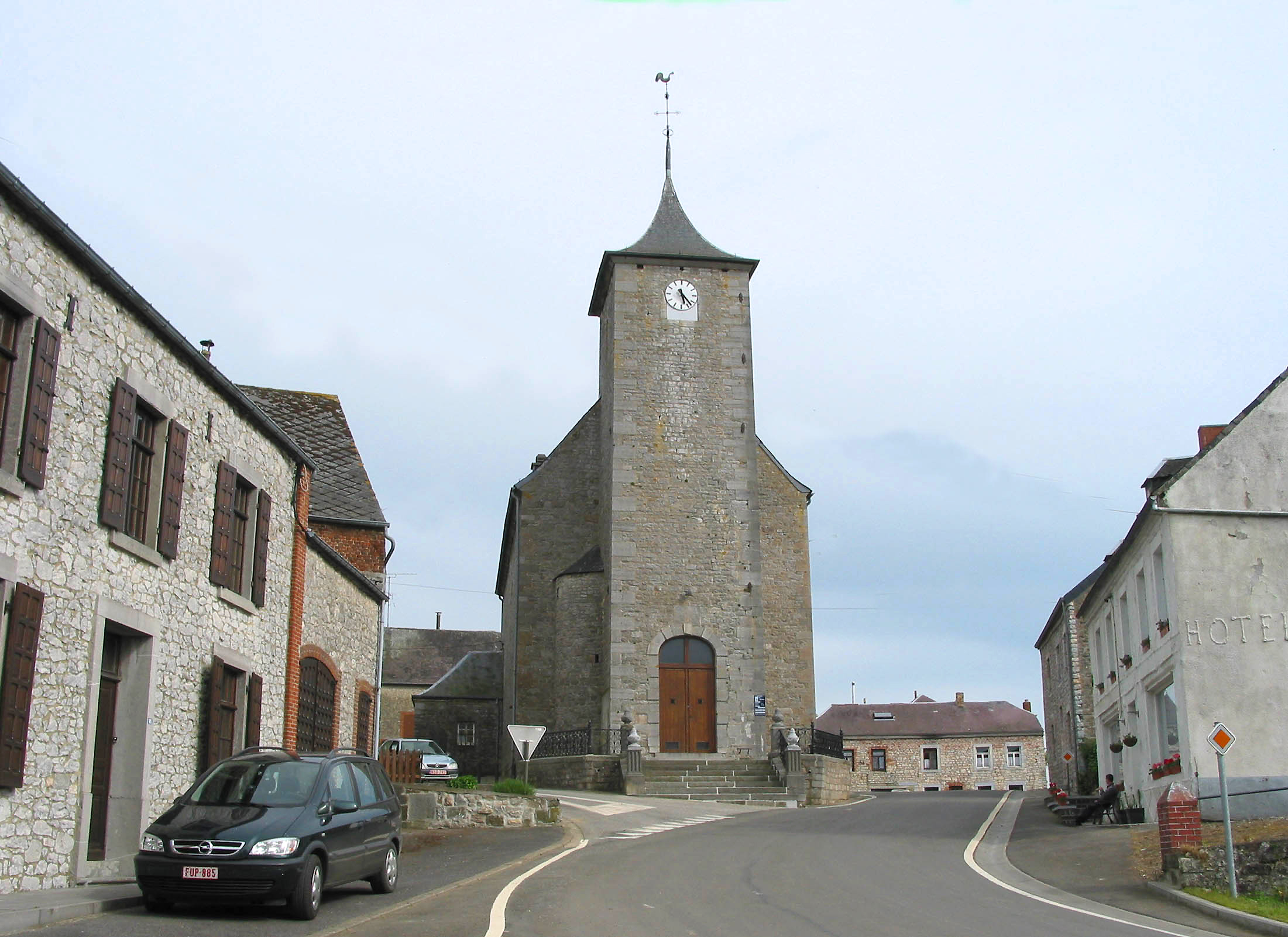
- Gochenée

- Location within Belgium Location within Europe
- Coordinates: 50°11′02″N 04°45′36″E
- Country: Belgium
- Region: Wallonia
- Province: Namur
- Municipality: Doische

Gochenée (French pronunciation: [ɡɔʃne]; Walloon: Gochnêye) is a village in Wallonia and a district of the municipality of Doische, located in the province of Namur, Belgium.

The village church dates from the 18th century. The former village school is from 1854.

Architect Alphonse Balat was born in Gochenée.
