= Lady Moyra Butler =

Butler dynasty member (1920–1959)

- Comtesse van den Steen de Jehay (Lady Moyra Butler) in Switzerland, 1956 (photo: Brodrick Haldane)
- Born: 2 December 1920
- Died: 26 May 1959 (aged 38)
- Other names: Lady Moyra Weld-Forester (1940–1948); Countess van den Steen de Jehay (1948–1959)
- Spouse: Charles Robert Cecil Weld-Forester (m. 1940; div. 1948) Guy Van Den Steen (m. 1948)
- Children: Piers Weld-Forester (1946–1977); Count Gerard van den Steen de Jehay (1948–1985)
- Parents: George Butler, 5th Marquess of Ormonde (father); The Hon. Sybil Fellowes (mother)
- Family: Butler dynasty

Lady Moyra Butler (2 December 1920 – 26 May 1959) was the daughter of George Butler, 5th Marquess of Ormonde and Sybil Butler, Marchioness of Ormonde (nee The Hon. Sybil Fellowes). She was one of the last members of the Butler Dynasty to reside at Kilkenny Castle. Along with her second husband Count Guy van den Steen de Jehay she financed and oversaw the restoration of the Van den Steen's ancestral seat in Belgium, the Chateau de Jehay during the 1950s. During the Second World War she was, for a time, reportedly the only female transport driver attached to the British Red Cross Prisoners of War Department. Through her mother she was a first-cousin once-removed of British Prime Minister Winston Churchill.

== Biography ==
=== Early life ===
Lady Moyra Butler was born at 19 Gloucester Road, London, the London townhouse of her parents George, Earl of Ossory and Sybil, Countess of Ossory. In the year prior to her birth her father had been named as the life-tenant of the Ormonde Settled Estates Trust in the Will of his uncle James Butler, 3rd Marquess of Ormonde; consequently much of her youth was spent at the Ormonde's ancestral seat Kilkenny Castle, as well as the homes of her grandparents Arthur Butler, 4th Marquess of Ormonde and Ellen, Marchioness of Ormonde at Gennings Park in Kent and 11 Bryanston Square, London.

In 1935 due to the increased costs of maintaining the Castle, Lord Ossory made the decision to vacate the Castle; the family made the Ormonde Shooting Lodge Ballyknockane Lodge, Tipperary their principal Irish residence. The Ossory's also leased a series of London Residences in the 1920s and 1930s, including 19 Gloucester Road, 2A Duke Street in Manchester Square, and 30 St John's Wood Park.

=== Debutante ===
In March 1938, an article about prominent debutantes in The Bystander featured a profile of Lady Moyra, and noted that she had just returned to England from a six-month stay in Germany.

Moyra was presented at Court in May 1938. Lord and Lady Ossory hosted a large ball at the London townhouse of the Marquess and Marchioness of Ormonde, 11 Bryanston Square, in June 1938 during Lady Moyra's debutant season. This dance was a joint coming-of-age party for Lady Moyra's brother, Anthony Butler, Viscount Thurles, as well as a debutant 'coming-out' party for Moyra. The guest list reported in newspapers at the time includes multiple prominent individuals from British and American High Society during the late 1930s, including American Ambassador Joseph Kennedy, Kathleen Kennedy, the-then Mistress of the Robes the Duchess of Northumberland, Lord Carisbrooke, Lady Iris Mountbatten, Clarissa Churchill, the Earl Spencer and The Hon. Pamela Digby.

Moyra also attended a debutante ball given by Rose Kennedy (wife of U.S. Ambassador Joseph P. Kennedy) for her daughters Kathleen and Rosemary at the American Embassy in London in May 1938.

In 1939 Lord Ossory, Lady Ossory, and Lady Moyra were recorded as living in inner-northern London at 30 St John's Wood Park. Despite the reduced circumstances of the family, a butler, cook, housemaid, kitchenmaid, and lady's maid were also recorded as living at this address. Prior to her marriage, she appeared in newspaper advertisements for Pond's Creams.

=== First marriage and War work ===
Following the outbreak of the Second World War, Moyra joined the Auxiliary Territorial Service as an Ambulance Driver. During the flurry of marriages in the weeks following the outbreak of war, her engagement to Lt. Charles Weld-Forester was announced. Charles was a grandson of Cecil Weld-Forester, 5th Baron Forester and cousin to The 7th Baron Forester. Through his mother Lady Victoria Weld-Forester (née Wynn-Carington), he was also a grandson of Charles Wynn-Carington, 1st Marquess of Lincolnshire.

After several last-minute date changes due to Lt Weld-Forester's army postings, the couple were married at St George's, Hanover Square on 30 April 1940. Charles' mother Lady Victoria had previously served as a Lady-in-Waiting to Queen Mary, who sent a telegram of congratulations to him on the morning of the Wedding Day. It was reported that the Duke and Duchess of Marlborough, and Winston and Clementine Churchill were invited to the wedding. Moyra wore the bridal veil of her famed ancestress Sarah Churchill, Duchess of Marlborough (a Churchill family heirloom; Moyra was a great-granddaughter of John Spencer-Churchill, 7th Duke of Marlborough).

Eight days after the wedding, tragedy struck when Moyra's brother, James Anthony Butler, Viscount Thurles, died suddenly in a Nursing Home on the Isle of Wright; Moyra and Charles were reportedly at his bedside.

On 5 June 1940 Lt Wed-Forester was reported as missing following the defence of Calais. On 19 July 1940 it was reported that he was wounded and captured by the advancing German Army. During her husband's time as a prisoner of war, Lady Moyra was reported to be the only female transport driver attached to the British Red Cross Prisoners of War Department in February 1942. Charles remained a Prisoner of War for the following five years; he was later released from Oflag IV-C (Colditz Castle) in April 1945 as American Troops approached the camp, and returned to England on 27 April 1945. The couple purchased the freehold of Delamere House in Lambourn, Berkshire for £7,500 in August 1945, and on 23 April 1946 Lady Moyra gave birth to their only child Piers Weld-Forester.

=== Divorce and Second marriage ===
On 19 December 1947, Moyra's husband Charles sued her for divorce on the grounds that she had committed adultery with a Belgian Aristocrat, noted sculptor and Olympian Comte Guy van den Steen de Jehay during a holiday in Europe during the summer. Lady Moyra did not defend the suit, and a decree nisi was granted with costs against Count Guy van den Steen. Guy did not defend the divorce suit of his own wife, Comtesse Marie-Estelle van den Steen de Jehay, who was granted a decree nisi for a divorce on the grounds of desertion on 25 May 1948. On 3 August 1948 Guy and Lady Moyra were married at the Chelsea Register Office London. Their only son Gerard van den Steen was born in London on 10 October 1949.

=== Belgium ===
During the 1940s, Count Guy van den Steen inherited his family's ancestral home, the Chateau de Jehay (Jehay-Bodegnée Castle). He reported that it was a 'dark, empty shell, surrounded by flat, uncultivated fields' at the time he came into possession of the Chateau. Lady Moyra and Count Guy moved into the Castle in 1950, and worked to restore the Chateau as a private residence; many Ormonde heirlooms continue to be held in the Chateau today.

Lady Moyra and her son Gerard were photographed for the Tatler and Bystander, and appeared on 25 January 1956 in the publication. An accompanying article noted that Moyra and her second husband Guy owned two miniature-Chalets in Grindelwald, Switzerland, where they spent the winter season skiing and entertaining friends each year.

=== Inheritance and wealth ===
Moyra's inheritance from her parents and grandmother enabled her to facilitate the restoration of the Chateau de Jehay at private residence.

Upon her first marriage Moyra's parents had transferred the funds held in their marriage settlement to her. The settlement had initially consisted of £23,000 provided by George's mother Lady Arthur Butler and the income from £8,000 provided by Sybil's father. In 1925 Sybil's portion was increased to £17,500 under the terms of her father's Will, and George's mother Ellen provided an additional lump sum of £15,000 in 1929, which ultimately increased the size of the marriage settlement trust to £55,500 (£3,040,000 in 2025).

The terms of the 1938 Deed of Resettlement of the Ormonde Settled Estates Trust also empowered George, Earl of Ossory to place a charge of up to £10,000 onto any children of his, other than his first-born son. Following George's death in 1949, in addition to this £10,000 (£305,000 in 2025 when adjusted for inflation), Moyra was also beneficiary of her father's personal estate, much of which was sold at Auction in Dublin in January 1953. Contemporary newspaper articles report that the auction included over 100 oil paintings from the Collection of the 5th Marquess of Ormonde.

As Moyra outlived both her father and brother, she also inherited a quarter-share of the residuary estate of her wealthy American grandmother Ellen, Dowager Marchioness of Ormonde, who died in 1951. Ellen had inherited approximately $300,000 from her father General Anson Stager in 1885, as well as the bulk of the $847,000 estate of her sister Annie Stager Hickox upon the latter's death in 1922. By the early 1930s, Ellen's fortune, held in a Trust in Ohio, produced an income of £16,000 (approximately US $80,000, or $1,887,805 in 2024 when adjusted for inflation) annually.

=== Remainder to the Ormonde Settled Estates Trust ===
In 1938, Moyra's father, George, Earl of Ossory, together with her brother Viscount Thurles, re-settled the Ormonde Settled Estates Trust. Under the revised terms, should the male-line descendants of John Butler, 2nd Marquess of Ormonde become extinct, the family's ancestral estates and remaining wealth were to pass to Moyra and her descendants.

This contingency eventuated following the death of Arthur Butler, 6th Marquess of Ormonde in 1971. Between 1975 and 1980, negotiations were undertaken to transfer the family's extensive collection of gold and silver heirlooms to the British Government in lieu of Estate Duty. By that time, the marquessate and life-interest in the Ormonde Settled Estates Trust had passed to Arthur's cousin, Charles Butler, 7th Marquess of Ormonde. As the Seventh Marquess of Ormonde had no sons, under the terms of the 1938 Trust re-settlement Moyra's two sons were next in line to inherit the life interest of the Trust.

Negotiations for the transfer were delayed following the unexpected death of Moyra's eldest son, Piers Weld-Forester, in 1977. As Piers died childless, subsequent efforts had to be undertaken in Belgium to locate and inform Moyra's younger son, Count Gerard van den Steen de Jehay, of his position as the remainderman of the Trust. Only after his position was explained and formal consent obtained could the necessary Court Orders be secured to complete the transfer.

=== Death ===
Lady Moyra died at the Chateau de Jehay, Belgium on 26 May 1959 at the age of 38.

== Issue and descendants ==
Moyra was the mother of two sons:

By her first husband Lt. Charles Weld-Forester:

- Piers Edric Weld-Forester (23 April 1946 – 30 October 1977)

By her second husband Count Guy van den Steen de Jehay:

- Comte Gerard Fernand Georges Ghislain van den Steen de Jehay (10 October 1949 – 15 April 1985)

Her first son Piers Weld-Forester was a prominent figure in London high society in the late 1960s and early 1970s. Described as a 'playboy in the true sense of the word', he was briefly the boyfriend of Princess Anne in 1971 and went on to become a motorcycle racer. He was married on 6 June 1973 at Guards Chapel, Wellington Barracks to the model Georgina Youens, daughter of clergyman John Youens, who at the time held the post of Chaplain-General to the Forces. Piers' best man was The Hon. Brian Alexander (son of Field Marshal Harold Alexander, 1st Earl Alexander of Tunis). Georgina Weld-Forrester was killed less than a year later in the Ermenonville air disaster. Piers died in a motorcycle crash in 1977.

During his lifetime, Piers was one of the last remaining male members of the Butler dynasty, along with his great-uncle Arthur Butler, 6th Marquess of Ormonde and first cousin twice-removed Charles Butler, 7th Marquess of Ormonde. Upon the transfer of the family's ancestral home, Kilkenny Castle, to the local government in 1967, the remainder of the Ormonde Settled Estates Trust was wound up and split equally between the 6th Marquess, Charles Butler (later 7th Marquess) and Piers.

Moyra's second son Gerard married in 1974 and had three daughters. He predeceased his father, dying on 15 April 1985. Count Guy left the Chateau de Jehay to the province of Liege upon his death in 1999.

== Ancestry ==
Ancestors of Lady Moyra Butler

James Butler, 1st Marquess of Ormonde
John Butler, 2nd Marquess of Ormonde
Grace Louisa Staples
Arthur Butler, 4th Marquess of Ormonde
Gen. Sir Edward Paget
Frances Jane Paget
Lady Harriet Legge
George Butler, 5th Marquess of Ormonde
Henry W. Stager
Anson Stager
Almira Anson
Ellen Stager
William Sprague
Rebecca Sprague
Desiree Benham
Lady Moyra Butler
William Henry Fellowes
Edward Fellowes, 1st Baron de Ramsey
Emma Benyon
William Fellowes, 2nd Baron de Ramsey
George Milles, 4th Baron Sondes
The Hon. Mary Julia Milles
Eleanor Knatchbull
The Hon. Sybil Fellowes
George Spencer-Churchill, 6th Duke of Marlborough
John Spencer-Churchill, 7th Duke of Marlborough
Lady Jane Stewart
Lady Rosamond Spencer-Churchill
Charles Vane, 3rd Marquess of Londonderry
Lady Frances Vane
Lady Frances Vane-Tempest
