= Guy Van Den Steen =

Belgian sculptor

Guy van den Steen de Jehay
- Born: 24 August 1906; Paris, France
- Died: 20 December 1999 (aged 93); Jehay, Belgium
- Occupation: Sculptor

Count Guy van den Steen de Jehay (24 August 1906 – 20 December 1999) was a Belgian sculptor and aristocrat. He was the younger son of Belgian diplomat Werner van den Steen de Jehay, and nephew of Frédéric van den Steen de Jehay.

== Career ==
His work was part of the sculpture event in the art competition at the 1948 Summer Olympics.

=== Restoration of the Chateau de Jehay ===
In the 1940s, Count Guy van den Steen inherited his family's ancestral home, the Chateau de Jehay. He reported that it was a 'dark, empty shell, surrounded by flat, uncultivated fields' at the time he came into possession of the Chateau. Lady Moyra and Count Guy moved into the Castle in 1950, and worked to restore the Chateau, and many Ormonde heirlooms can be found in the Chateau today.

== Marriages and family ==
Guy first married Marie-Estelle Barker in 1940; the couple were childless. Marie sued Guy for divorce in 1948, and she was granted a decree nisi in London on the grounds of desertion on 25 May 1948. In 1947, Guy had begun an extramarital affair with British aristocrat Lady Moyra Weld-Forester, the daughter of George Butler, 5th Marquess of Ormonde and Sybil Butler, Marchioness of Ormonde.

In December 1947, Lady Moyra's husband Charles Weld-Forester sued her for divorce, alleging that she had committed adultery with Guy van den Steen "on the continent last summer". Lady Moyra did not defend the suit, and a decree nisi was granted with costs against Count Guy van den Steen.

Guy and Moyra subsequently were married at the Chelsea Register Office London on 3 August 1948. The couple had one child:

- Comte Gerard Fernand Georges Ghislain van den Steen de Jehay (10 October 1949 – 15 April 1985)

Lady Moyra died in 1959.
