= Jehay-Bodegnée Castle =

Castle in Liège Province, Belgium

Jehay Castle
- Amay, Wallonia, Belgium
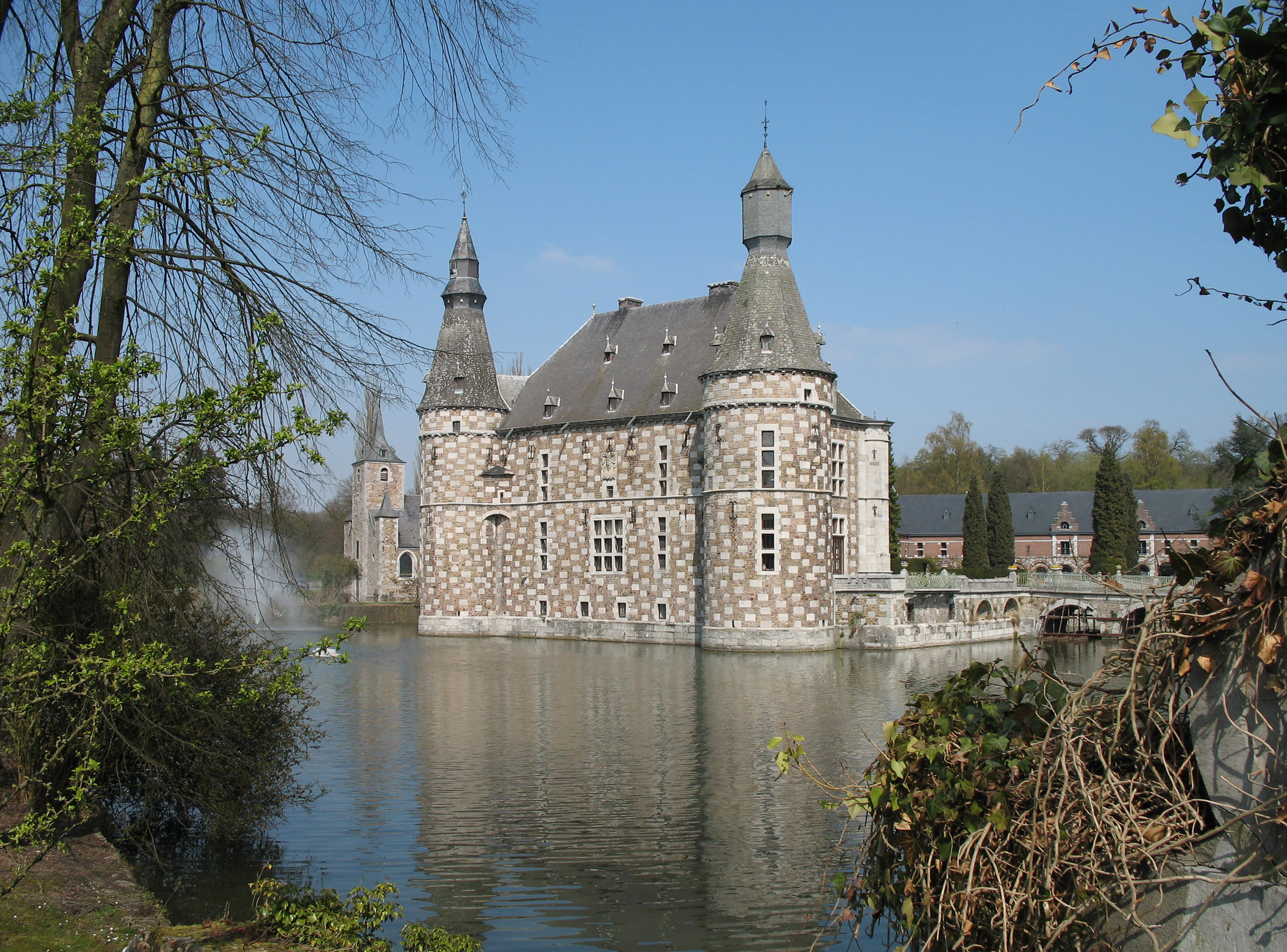

Site information
- Type: Castle

Location
- Coordinates: 50.576°N 5.323°E

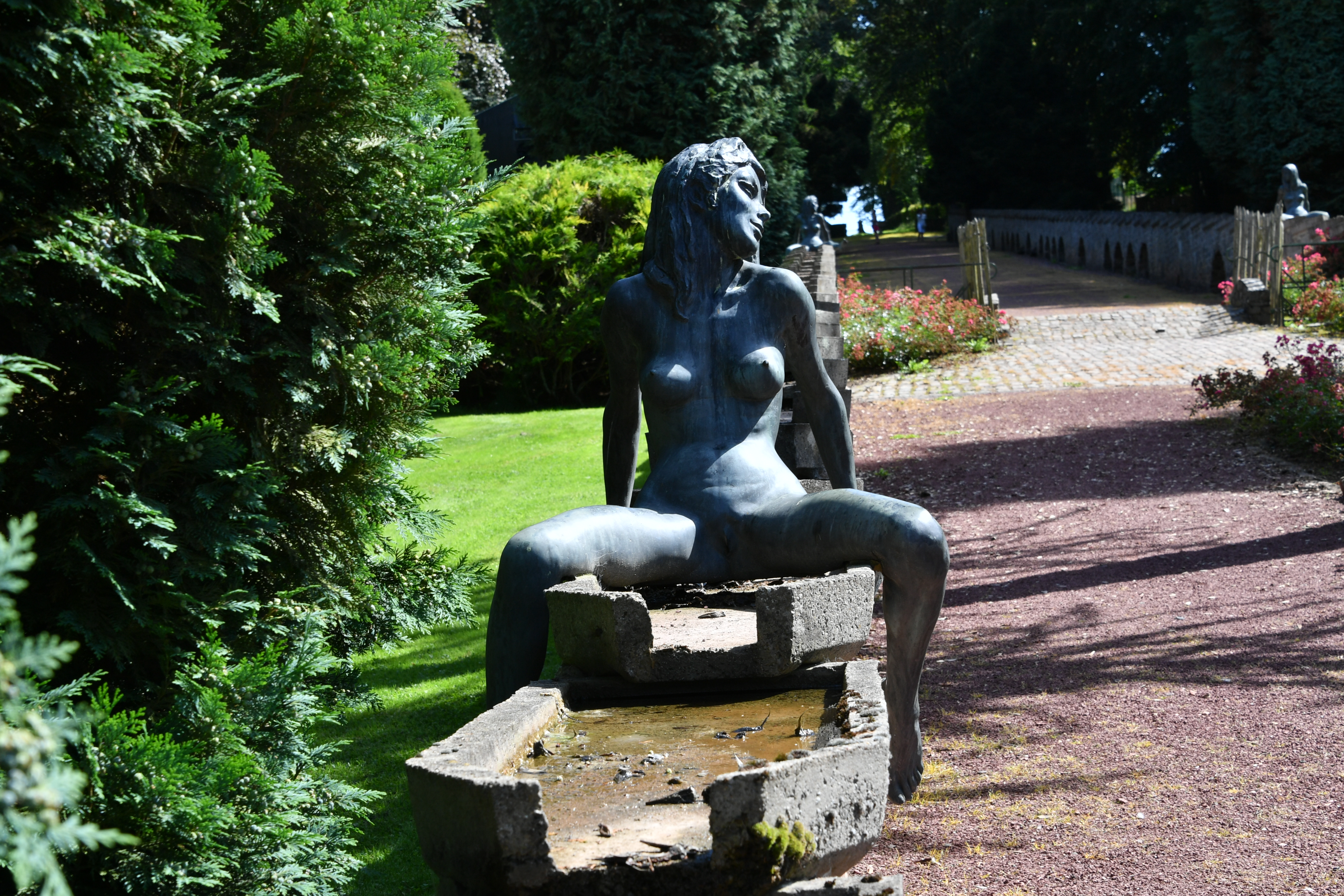
Jardin Château de Jehay 2016

Jehay Castle or Jehay-Bodegnée Castle (French: Château de Jehay or Jehay-Bodegnée) is a castle situated in the municipality of Amay in Liège Province, Wallonia, Belgium.

== History ==
Most of the structure of the current château dates from the beginning of the 16th century. Of its medieval predecessor there remain only some vaulted basements of the former keep, dating from the 13th century. In the 19th century the castle was extensively renovated and extended by the famous architect Alphonse Balat in a sober Gothic Revival style. The beautifully decorated interior houses a collection of antique furniture, musical instruments, tapestry, paintings and other art objects.

Since the end of the 17th century the castle has been the property of the Counts van den Steen de Jehay. In the 1940s, Count Guy van den Steen de Jehay inherited the Chateau. He reported that it was a 'dark, empty shell, surrounded by flat, uncultivated fields' at the time he came into possession. He and his second wife, Lady Moyra Butler moved into the castle in 1950, and worked to restore the Chateau. After Guy's death in 1999, the castle and its collections were acquired by Liège Province.

The domain is open to visitors every day except Mondays, between April and October. The interior of the castle is closed for restoration (situation 2015). The earliest known illustrations of this park are 18th-century works by Remacle Leloup, a Liège artist famous for his drawings and engravings of monuments and sites in the Liège region. A few bowers and chestnut groves remain from this period. The gardens were completely redesigned by the château's last resident, Count Guy van den Steen de Jehay, in the mid-twentieth century.

== See also ==
- List of castles in Belgium
- List of protected heritage sites in Amay
