= Peter Mallett =

British priest and chaplain-general

The Venerable Peter Mallett, CB, OStJ, QHC (1 September 1925 – 5 June 1996) was a Church of England priest and British Army padre, who served as Chaplain-General to the Forces between 1974 and 1980.

== Early life ==
Mallett was born on 1 September 1925 in Leicester, Leicestershire, England. He completed his theological education at King's College London. He then began his National Service in the Royal Air Force. However, after a short time he left to work in the Cinderhill Pit, Nottinghamshire for two and a half years.

In 1951, he was ordained a deacon in the Church of England by Archbishop Geoffrey Fisher in Canterbury Cathedral. He became curate at St Oswald's, Norbury, in south London. In 1952, he was ordained a priest.

== Military career ==
Mallett undertook two weeks' initial training at Bagshot Park, Surrey. Following this, on 4 January 1954, he was commissioned into the Royal Army Chaplains' Department as a Chaplain to the Forces 4th Class. He was given the service number 432359. He joined 1st Battalion, the Queen's Royal Regiment (West Surrey) when they were posted abroad to take part in the Malayan Emergency. He was promoted to Chaplain to the Forces 3rd Class on 1 April 1961. He served as Senior Chaplain of the Aden Brigade, during the Aden Emergency. He left with the final evacuation in 1967 on the creation of South Yemen. On 19 December 1967, he was promoted to Chaplain to the Forces 2nd Class. He joined the British Army of the Rhine and served as Deputy Assistant Chaplain-General in Berlin in 1968. He then took up the post of Senior Chaplain at the Royal Military Academy, Sandhurst in 1969. On 1 September 1972, he was promoted to Chaplain to the Forces 1st Class. He was posted to Northern Ireland in 1972. This was a period of The Troubles that saw the passing of the Northern Ireland (Temporary Provisions) Act 1972 and the implementation of direct rule. In 1973, he returned to West Germany and served as Assistant Chaplain-General to the British Army of the Rhine.

On 3 June 1974, he was appointed acting Chaplain-General to the Forces. On 1 July 1974, his appointment to Chaplain-General to the Forces in the rank of major general was confirmed. He succeeded John Youens who had served as Chaplain-General for the previous eight years.

On 1 July 1980, he retired from the British Army.

== Later life ==
Between 1981 and 1986, he was managing director of Inter-Church Travel, an organisation that arranged pilgrimages, and religious and cultural journeys. In 1982, he became a Canon of the Diocese of Europe and retired form that position in 1996.

He maintained ties with the British Army through being Honorary Chaplain to a number of Regimental Associations: the Royal Regiment of Artillery, the Royal Tank Regiment and the Princess of Wales's Royal Regiment.

He died in Yalding, Kent on 5 June 1996.

== Personal life ==
In 1958, he married Joan Bremer. Together they had one son and two daughters. Mrs Mallett died on 3 May 2025.

== Honours and decorations ==
On 30 August 1957, Mallett was Mentioned in Despatches 'in recognition of gallant and distinguished conduct in operations in Malaya during the period ending on that date'.

On 20 July 1973, he was appointed Honorary Chaplain to the Queen (QHC). In April 1976, he was appointed Officer of the Venerable Order of Saint John (OStJ). In the 1978 Birthday Honours, he was appointed Companion of the Order of the Bath (CB).
