= Royal Château of Ardenne =

Former Belgian royal residence in Houyet, Belgium

Coordinates: 50.2°N 5.01°E

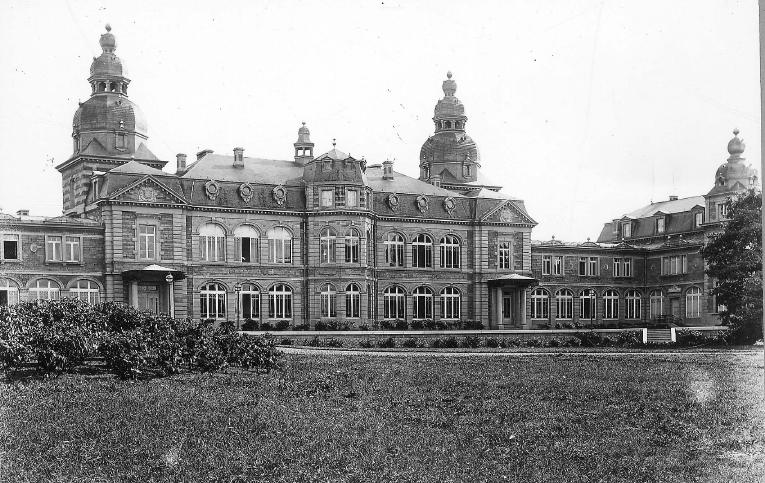
Royal Château of Ardenne in 1898

The Royal Château of Ardenne (French: Château royal d'Ardenne; Dutch: Koninklijk Kasteel van Ardenne, formerly also spelled "Hardenne") was a former residence and summer retreat of the Belgian royal family situated in the municipality of Houyet, Namur Province, Wallonia. It served as a luxury hotel from 1891 to 1949 and burned down in 1968.

== History ==
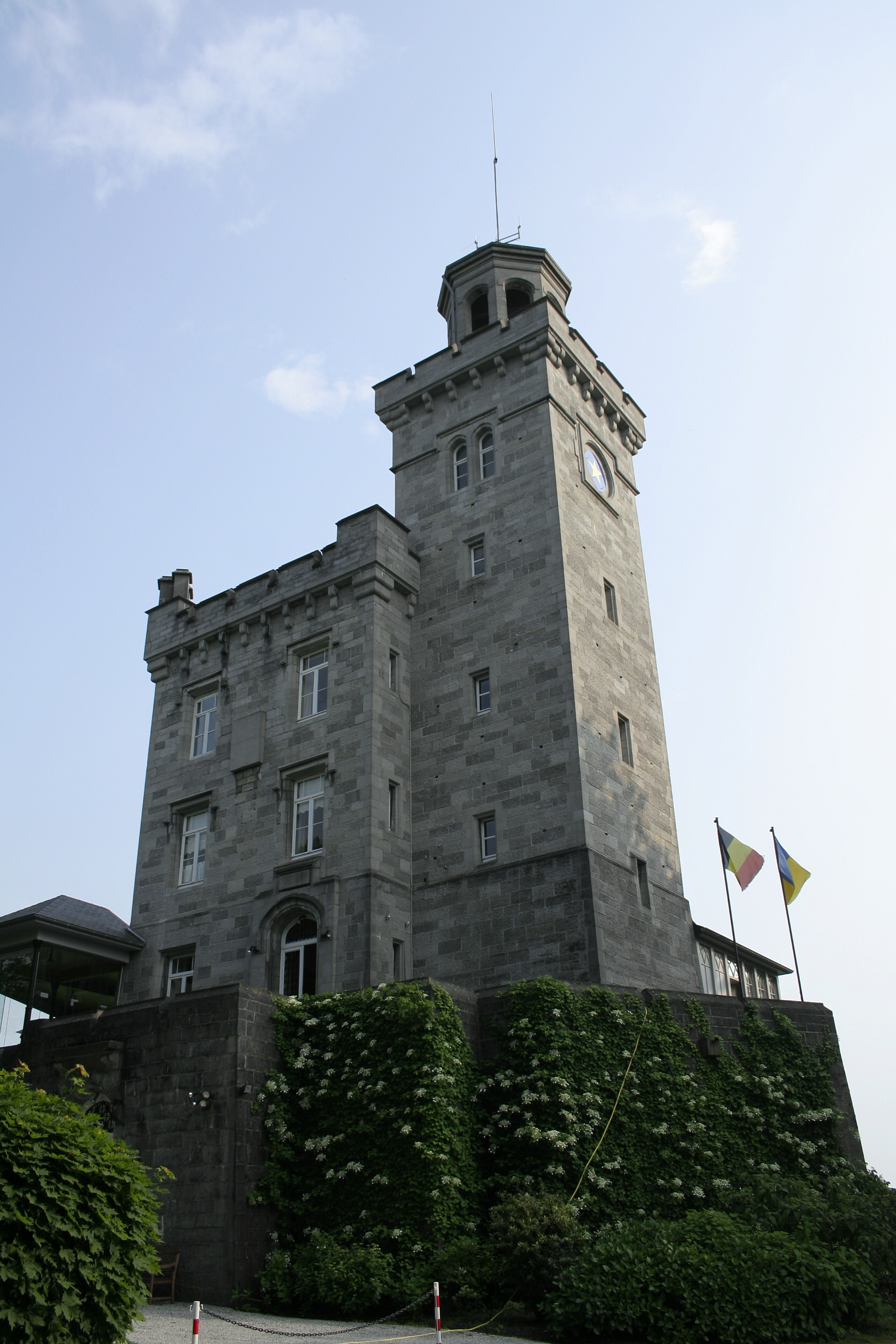
Leopold Tower, remains of the vast château (1878)

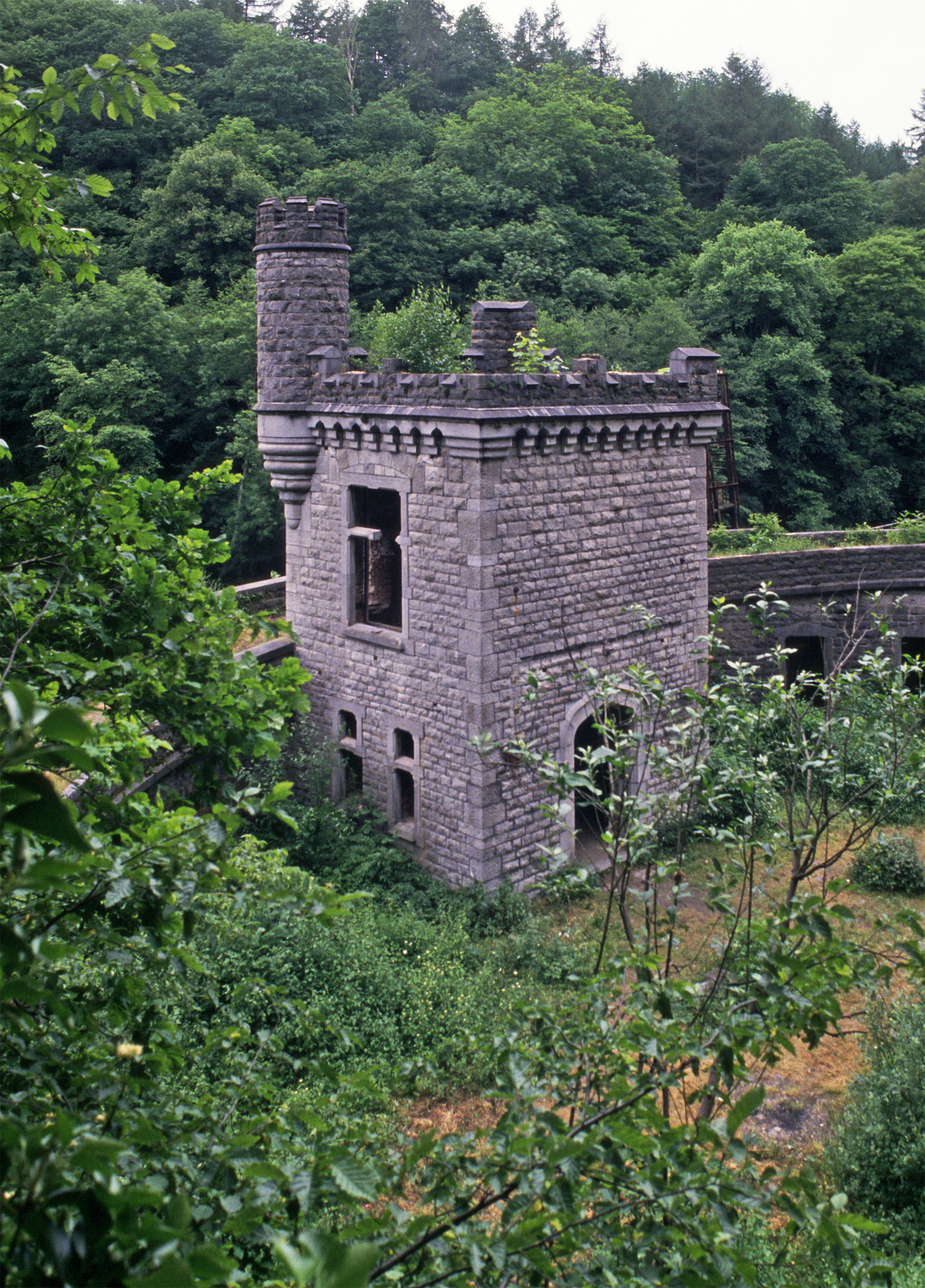
The former train station Halte royale d'Ardenne as it was in 1990

=== Royal residence ===
On 21 March 1837, King Leopold I bought 708 hectares (1,750 acres) of land called "Terre d'Hardenne et de Férage". In this domain, crossed by the Lesse and the Ywoigne, he had a rock tower built in 1843 and extended an existing hunting lodge with two towers. In the same period, the king also started the construction of a country house a few kilometers away: the Royal Castle of Ciergnon.

After the enthronement, King Leopold II had his father's manor demolished in 1874 to make way for the new Royal Château of Ardenne. The building by his court architect Alphonse Balat was completed in 1891. The gardens were created by the French landscape architect Elie Lainé.

=== Hotel ===
Even before he could really use the château, Leopold completely changed his mind. Instead of a royal country house, Ardenne would become a luxury hotel with 140 rooms. The château was an attractive destination that would promote tourism for the bourgeoisie to the Ardennes. In 1897–98, a hotel building was erected according to plans by Alban Chambon. It was called annexe but was not less sumptuous than the main building. Each room had unparalleled comfort: a bathroom, running water, electric lighting and even a telephone. The hotel then also got its own station on railway line 166: the Halte royale d'Ardenne. The country's first golf course was also built there.

The hotel was initially managed by Colonel James North. After his death in 1898, it was leased to the Compagnie Internationale des Grands Hotels (CIGH), daughter of the Compagnie Internationale des Wagons-Lits (CIWL). After the dissolution of the Compagnie Internationale des Grands Hotels in 1907, Colonel Alexis Mols took over the lease. The operation was interrupted by the death of Leopold II in 1909. As a result, the domain, which then already counted 4,200 hectares (10,000 acres), ended up in the Belgian Royal Trust. The hotel was briefly closed but reopened in 1912. In that year, on the advice of King Albert I, Mols had founded the Hôtel du Château d'Ardenne à Houyet, which in turn entrusted the operation to the company Les Grands Hôtels Belges, with Georges Marquet as the prominent figure.

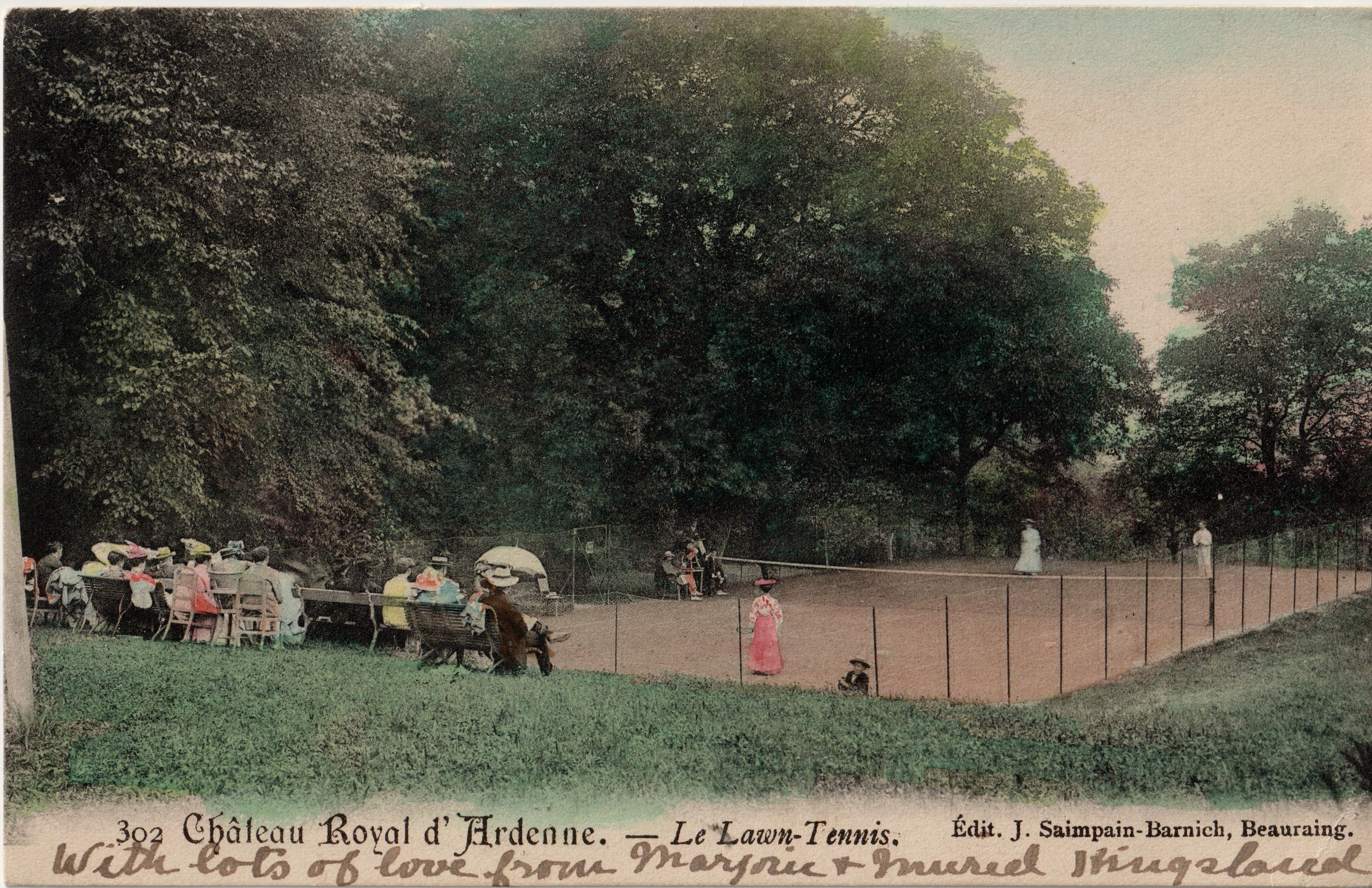
Tennis being played at the Royal Château of Ardenne, about 1905

=== Wars ===
During World War I, the hotel suffered from marauding troops (first French, then German). It was not reopened until 1920. The number of rooms was expanded to 200 in 1927 and the domain got its own airport in 1929. Damage in World War II was even worse than the first. Joachim von Ribbentrop housed his headquarters there. After the liberation, the domain was the command post of the American Fifteenth Army, which, however, evacuated it during the Battle of the Bulge. After the war, German prisoners of war worked on the domain for some time. The Elleboudt-Lemineur couple kept it open for another four years after the war, but the market for luxury tourism from France and England appeared to have dried up. The curtain finally fell in 1949. The furniture was sold to the public in 1950 and the rock tower became the club house of the Royal Golf Club du Château Royal d'Ardenne.

=== Fire and destruction ===
The château itself stood empty all this time and burned down in 1968 while roofing was being carried out on behalf of the Royal Trust. The garden sculptures were transferred to the Park of Laeken in Brussels (including Thomas Vinçotte's Seahorses) and the ruins were cleared in the 1970s. Although Chambon's outbuilding had not suffered any damage, it was also demolished. The rock tower was blown up in 1975, so the Leopold Tower is all that remains. It serves as a club house to the Royal Golf Club du Château Royal d'Ardenne.

== See also ==
- List of castles and châteaux in Belgium
- Culture of Belgium
- Belgium in the long nineteenth century
