= Alphonse Balat =

Belgian architect

Alphonse Hubert François Balat
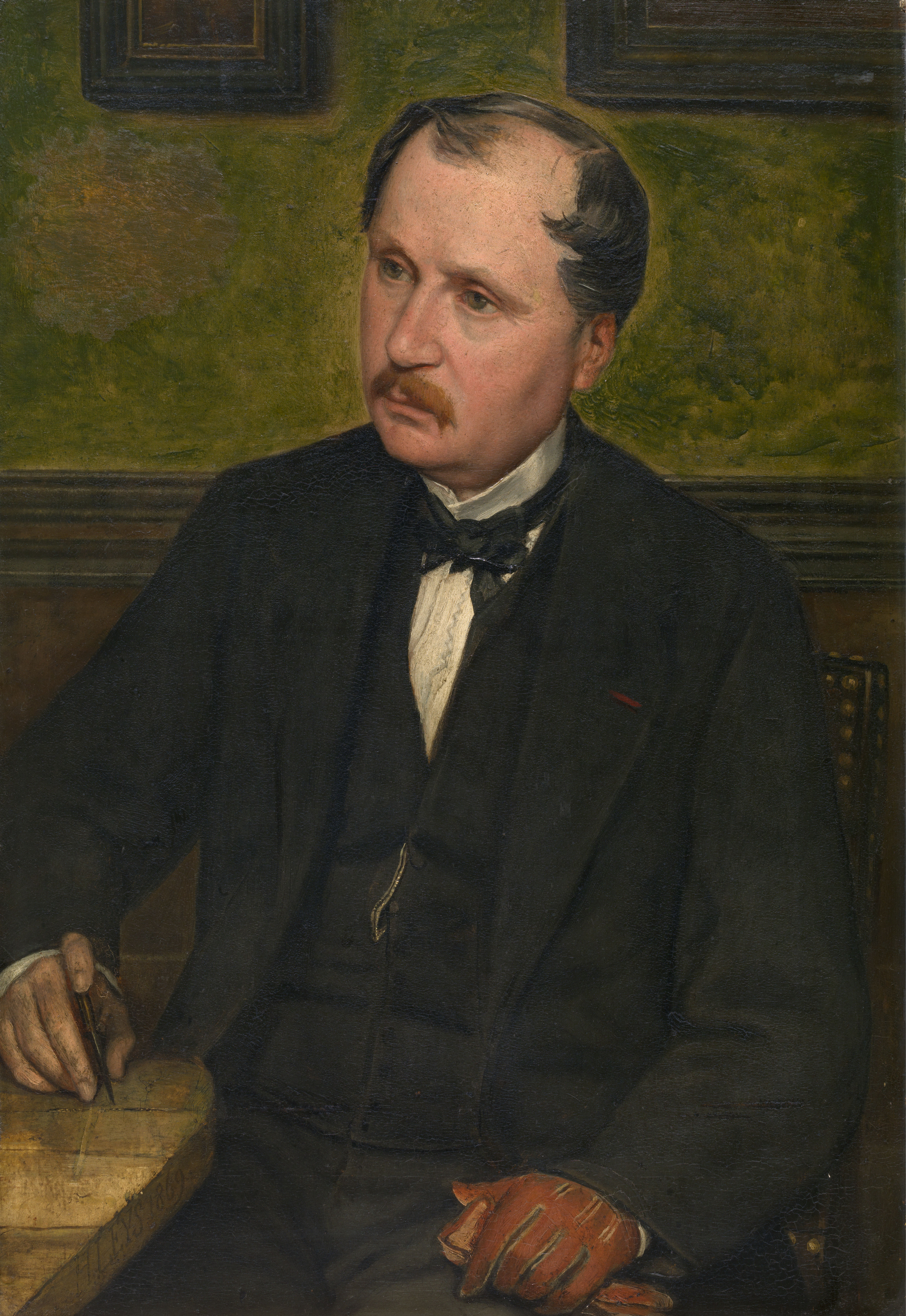
- Portrait of Balat by Jan August Hendrik Leys, 1866
- Born: 15 May 1818; Gochenée, Belgium
- Died: 16 September 1895 (aged 77); Ixelles, Belgium
- Occupation: Architect
- Buildings: Royal Greenhouses of Laeken; Royal Palace of Belgium; Royal Museums of Fine Arts of Belgium

Alphonse Hubert François Balat (French pronunciation: [alfɔ̃s ybɛʁ fʁɑ̃swa bala]; 15 May 1818 – 16 September 1895) was a Belgian architect.

== Life ==
Balat was born in Gochenée. He studied at the Academie of Namur and obtained his degree in architecture from the Royal Academy of Fine Arts of Antwerp in 1838. In 1839, he stayed in Paris for a year but returned after his father's death. He was soon discovered by the Walloon nobility for which he built or renovated a number of châteaus (amongst others Jehay-Bodegnée Castle and Presles Castle). Stylistically, these constructions often contained Renaissance elements with a neoclassical stress. In his interior designs, he also used elements from the Louis XV and Louis XVI styles.

In 1846, Balat settled in Brussels. He was introduced to the Belgian royal family after he was noticed for his design of a temporary festive decoration for the Salle de la Madeleine (Magdalenamarkt) where the royal family had been present (1848). In 1851 and 1856, he created several temporary festive decorations for the monarchy. In 1852, he was appointed as the architect of the Duke of Brabant, the later King Leopold II. In 1856, he constructed the town palace (Hôtel) of the Marquess of Assche (Asse) in the newly planned district called the Leopold Quarter. It was noticed for its austere classical neo-Renaissance facade inspired by Michelangelo's Palazzo Farnese in Rome. His rather sober classical approach was rare at that time when excessively decorated facades and interiors were much preferred. During his career, he built a large number of private residences. Most of them were demolished during the 20th century.

After Leopold II ascended the throne in 1865, Balat became his principal architect. Balat made a number of designs for the sumptuous reception rooms of the Royal Palace of Brussels such as the Throne Room, the Grand Staircase, and the Grand Gallery. For this realisations, he greatly followed the example of the French royal residences. Balat realised the facade on the back of the palace and the facades of the courtyards. His design for the principal facade of the palace is deeply influenced by the work of the French architect Ange-Jacques Gabriel. It was not executed during Balat's lifetime and later completed in an altered form by Henri Maquet.

Balat died at Ixelles, aged 76, and was buried in Laeken Cemetery.

== Royal Greenhouses of Laeken ==
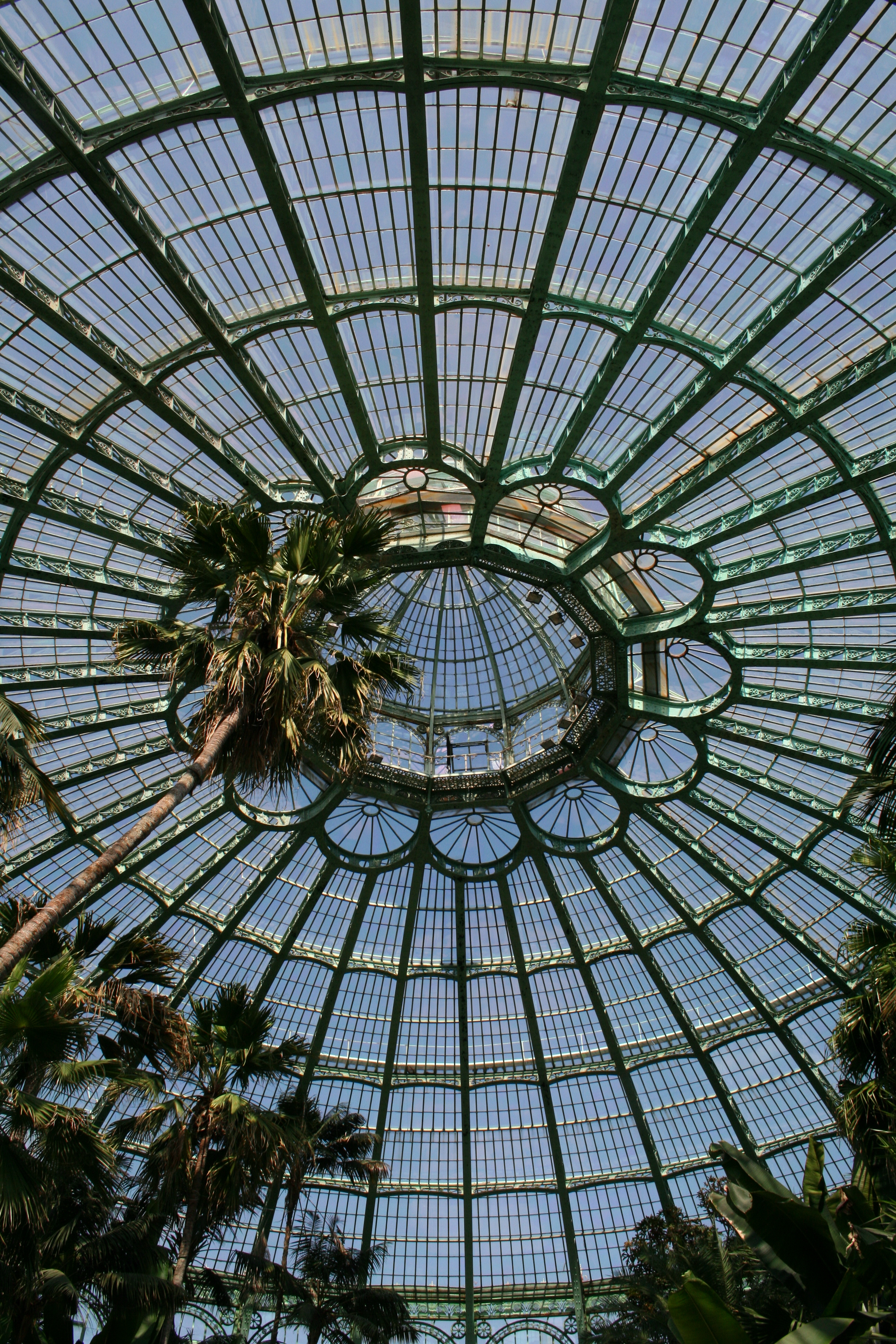
Internal view of the Winter Garden of the Royal Greenhouses of Laeken, designed by Alphonse Balat

Balat's most successful architectural project is the Royal Greenhouses of Laeken. It consists of a huge complex of several dome-shaped buildings in iron and glass that are connected by glass-roofed galleries. The centrepiece is the domed Winter Garden, which is a circular interpretation of the Palm House of the Royal Botanic Gardens, Kew. Working with new materials like iron and glass, Balat was obliged to abandon his classical stance. This stimulated the architect's imagination. In the steel constructions, he introduced decorative motifs derived from plants and flowers. This formed a first step towards Art Nouveau architecture that was further developed by Victor Horta who served as an apprentice of Balat.

== Honours ==
- 1881: Grand Officer in the Order of Leopold.
- 1862: Member of the Royal Academie.

== Works ==
- For Leopold II of Belgium:
  - Royal Palace of Brussels, Brussels (1866–1874) : Grand Staircase, decoration of divers room, Throne Room, back facade, several projects for the principal facade.
  - Royal Castle of Laeken : manège (1873–1874), new entrance gate (1879–1880), restoration after the fire (1890)
  - Royal Greenhouses of Laeken (1874–1890)
  - Royal Museums of Fine Arts of Belgium (1875–1880), rue de la Régence/Regentschapsstraat, Brussels.
  - Royal Castle of Ardenne (near Houyet), later converted into a luxury hotel. (1874-)
  - Royal Castle of Ciergnon (near Houyet).
  - Project for a 'Panthéon National', in Koekelberg (1880 - not realised), (colossal ionic temple)
  - Facade of the Royal Castle of Ciergnon (1880)
  - Project for the 'Montagne de la Cour', today called 'Mont des Arts'/'Kunstberg' in Brussels(1882, not realised)
- For other private patrons:
  - Transformations on the Castle of Jehay-Bodegnée
  - Castle of Warfusée in Saint-Georges-sur-Meuse : facade in Louis XV style and interior decoration (1840)
  - Château Saint-Marc, near Namur : facade
  - Château de Seilles-lez-Andenne
  - Castle of Houtain-le-Val : exterior renovation.
  - Château de Presles (1855)
  - Gentilhommière à Dave (1858)
  - Palace of Charles Vander Noot, Marquess of Assche, rue de la Science, 33 (today square Frère Orban) Brussels (1856–1858)
  - Transformation of the Opheylissem abbey into a 'château de plaisance' (dome)(1870)
  - Reconstruction of the Castle of Freÿr after the fire (since 1875)
  - Transformations on the Castle of Mirwart
- Other projects:
  - Festive decoration of the salle de la Madeleine in Brussels (1848)
  - Festive decoration of the 'salle du palais ducal' in Brussels (1851) and (1856).
  - 'Victoria Regia' greenhouse in the Zoo of Brussels (Leopold Park). Moved to the National Botanic Garden of Belgium in Meise. (Bouchout Castle)

== Gallery ==
Works of Alphonse Balt
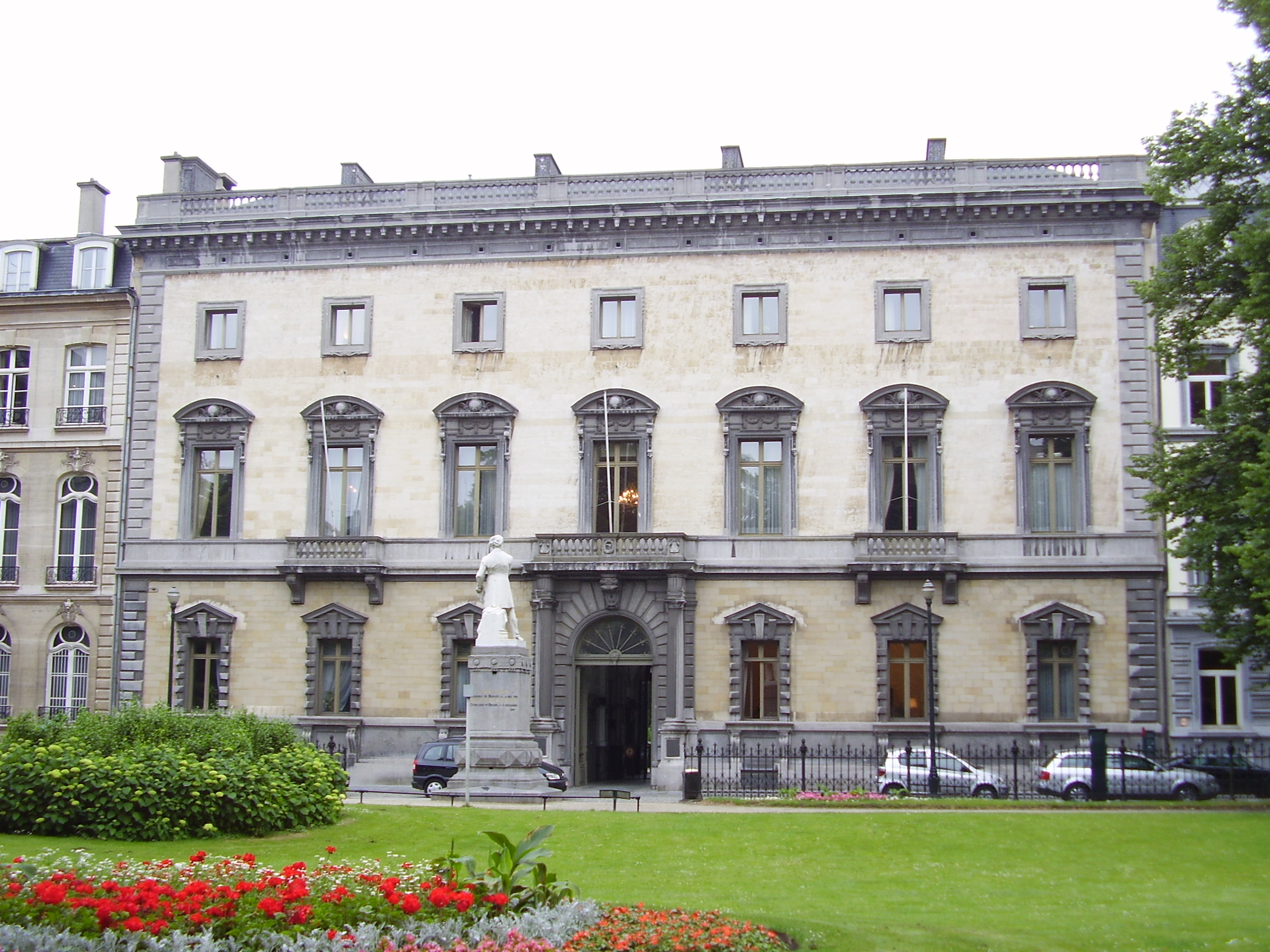
Palace of the Marquess of Assche (Asse)

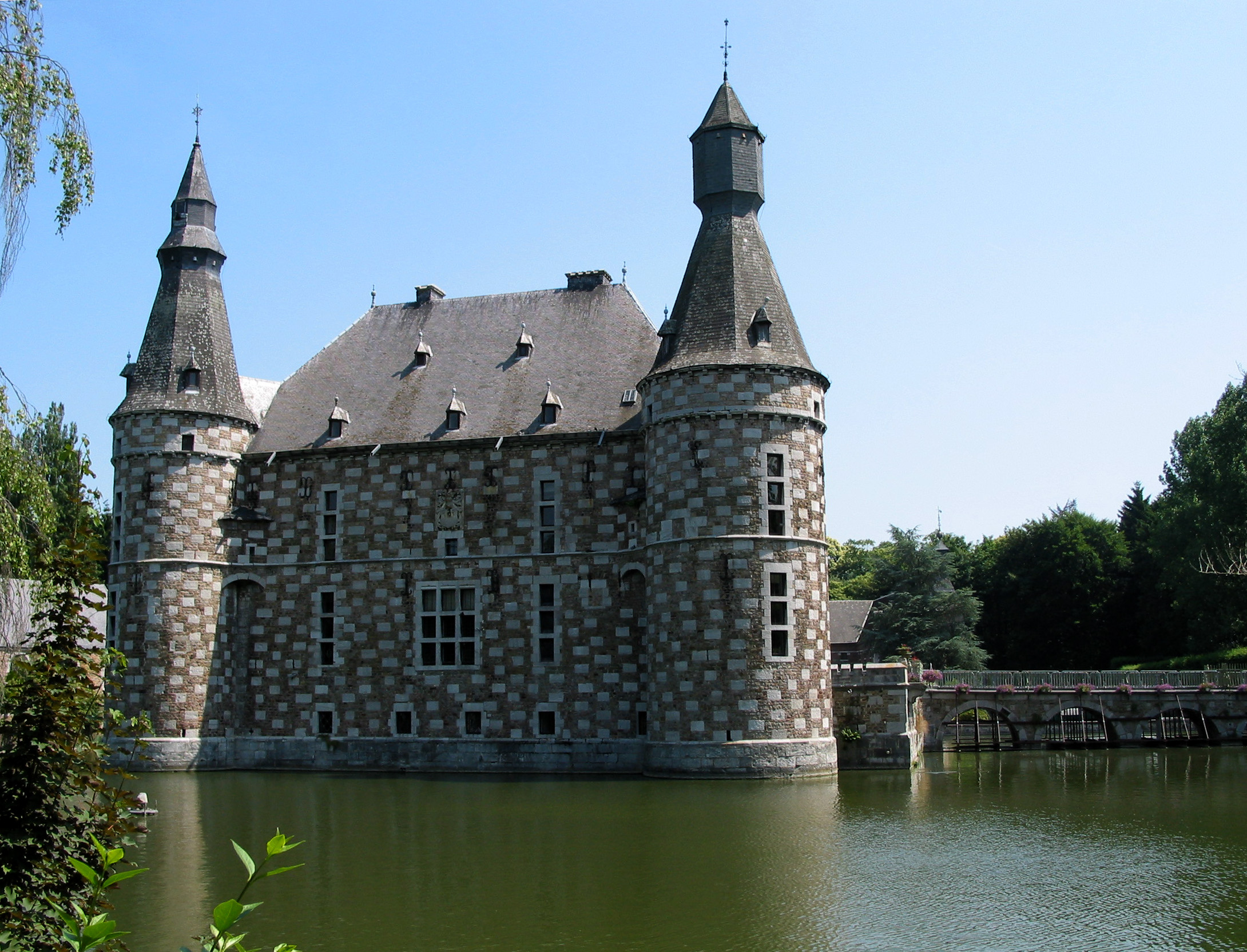
The medieval Castle of Jehay-Bodegnée renovated by Balat

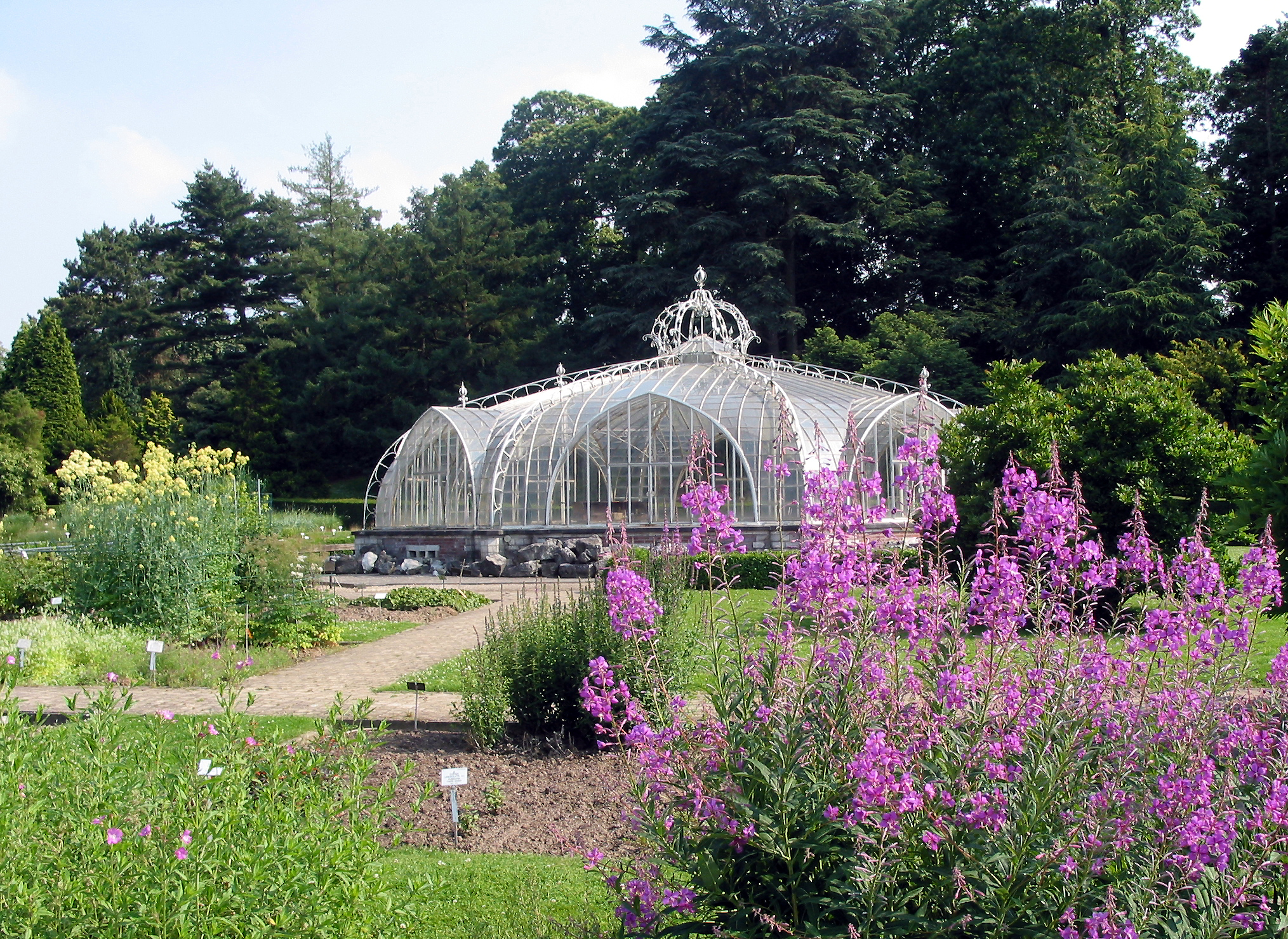
'Victoria Regia' greenhouse, designed by Alphonse Balat (Meise)

== Bibliography ==
- Bordiau, G., Notice sur Alphonse Balat, in Annuaire de l'Académie Royale des Sciences des Lettres et des Beaux-Arts de Belgique, Brussels, 1903, pp. 129–148.
- Clément, J., Alphonse Balat. Architecte du roi (1819-1895), Palais des Académies, Brussels, 1956.
- Martiny, V.G., 'Balat, Alphonse' in Biographie nationale'', Brussels, 1971, kol. 15–18.
- Poelaert en zijn tijd/Poelaert et son temps (exhib. cat.), Gemeentekrediet/Crédit communal, Brussels, 1980, pp. 199–209.
- Vandeweerdt, Dirk, Kunstgeschiedenis, architectuur en beeldhouwkunst, deel 6 in Culturele Geschiedenis van Vlaanderen, Baert, s.l., 1980.
- Goedleven, E., Fornari, B. en Vandenbreeden, J., De Koninklijke Serres van Laken, Lannoo, Tielt, 1988.
- Smets, Irène, De Koninklijke Serres te Laken, Ludion, Ghent, 2001.
