= Royal Trust (Belgium) =

1900 donation of land to the Belgian state by Leopold II

The Royal Trust Society of Belgium (Dutch: Koninklijke Schenking; French: Donation royale; German: Königliche Schenkung) was a donation to the state proposed in a letter by King Leopold II of Belgium on 9 April 1900. In addition some properties were added to the donation in a letter of 15 November 1900. The Belgian government accepted the donation by law on 31 December 1903 (Belgian Monitor of 1 January 1904). When the King handed the Congo Free State over to the Belgian government on 28 November 1907, additional properties were added to the Royal Trust (law of 18 October 1908, published in the Belgian Monitor of 18 October 1908).

The King donated his properties, such as his lands, castles and buildings, to the Belgian nation. Leopold did not want them to be divided amongst his three daughters, each of whom was married to a foreign prince. The donation was made on three conditions: the properties would never be sold, they would have to retain their function and appearance, and they would remain at the disposal of the successors to the Belgian throne. In 1930, the Royal Trust became an autonomous public institution which operates completely independently (Royal decree of 9 April 1930 - Belgian monitor of 29 May 1930).

== Properties ==
The Royal Palace of Brussels and the Royal Palace of Laeken are the property of the Belgian State and are not part of the Royal Trust. However the park surrounding the Royal Palace of Laeken and the Royal Greenhouses of Laeken do belong to the Royal Trust.

The Royal Trust also owns woods and land that it rents to private persons and semi-public institutions.

=== Used by the royal family (in present or past) ===
- Belvédère Château (private residence of King Albert II)
- Royal Castle of Ciergnon (royal summer retreat near Houyet, in the Ardennes)
- Fenffe Castle (holiday retreat near Ciergnon Castle)
- Park of the Royal Palace of Laeken (excluding the castle/palace itself)
- Royal Greenhouses of Laeken (used for state receptions, etc.)
- Château of Stuyvenberg (former residence of Queen Fabiola, now rented out for private residency)
- Villa Clémentine (currently the house of Prince Laurent and his family) in Tervuren
- Villa Schonenberg (residence of Archduchess Astrid, on the Stuyvenberg Château grounds)
- Villers-sur-Lesse Castle (near Houyet, occasionally used as a hunting lodge)

=== Open as public parks (total of 7000 ha) ===
- Arboretum in Tervuren
- Duden Park in Forest
- Elisabeth Park in Koekelberg
- Colonial Garden in Laeken
- Leopold II-park in Nieuwpoort
- Maria-Henriëttepark in Ostend

=== Open to the public ===
- Chinese Pavilion in Laeken
- Japanese Tower in Laeken
- Memorial Chapel for Queen Astrid, in Küssnacht, Switzerland

=== Rented to golf clubs ===
- Golf course in Klemskerke near De Haan
- Park of the Royal Château of Ardenne
- Park and castle at Ravenstein in Tervuren

=== Other ===
- Château Ferage/Feragekasteel
- Château of Val Duchesse in Auderghem
- Dunes in De Panne
- Koninklijke Villa (Royal Villa) in Ostend
- Offices in Brussels (Mont des Arts/Kunstberg)
- Ponds of Boitsfort
- Sports centre in Strombeek-Bever
- Terrains of the British School in Tervuren
- Carrefour des Quatre-Bras/Vier-Armenkruispunt
- Villers-sur-Lesse
- Wellington-renbaan (Wellington racecourse) and "Noorse Stallen" (Norwegian Stables) in Ostend
- 5 km² woodland in Postel
- 15.5 km² farmland
- 48 km² woodland in Houyet

== Sources ==
- Royal Trust (Dutch)
