= List of protected heritage sites in Amay =

This table shows an overview of the protected heritage sites in the Walloon town Amay. This list is part of Belgium's national heritage.

Object	Year/architect	Town/section	Address	Coordinates	Number^{?}	Image
Gossuart house ^{(nl)} ^{(fr)}		Amay		50.549239°N 5.317875°E	61003-CLT-0001-01 Info	
Church of St. George and St. Ode ^{(nl)} ^{(fr)}		Amay		50.548677°N 5.317494°E	61003-CLT-0002-01 Info	Collegiale kerk van Saint-Georges et Sainte-Ode
Tower ^{(nl)} ^{(fr)}		Amay	rue de l'industrie, Amay	50.545839°N 5.317381°E	61003-CLT-0003-01 Info	Toren
Abbey church of St. Matthew ^{(nl)} ^{(fr)}		Amay	Flône	50.558439°N 5.336321°E	61003-CLT-0004-01 Info	
Abbey Paix-Dieu and surrounding terrain ^{(nl)} ^{(fr)}		Amay	Jehay-Bodegnée	50.571088°N 5.295320°E	61003-CLT-0006-01 Info	Abdij van Paix-Dieu, en het ensemble vand e abdij en de omliggende terreinen
Church of St. Lambert ^{(nl)} ^{(fr)}		Jehay-Bodegnée Amay	Jehay	50.577601°N 5.323197°E	61003-CLT-0007-01 Info	Kerk Saint-Lambert
Facade and roof of castle Jehay-Bodegnée and surrounding terrain ^{(nl)} ^{(fr)}		Jehay-Bodegnée Amay		50.577290°N 5.323305°E	61003-CLT-0008-01 Info	Gevels en daken van het hoofdgebouw van het kasteel van Jehay-Bodegnée, gotische kelders, en het ensemble van het kasteel, de bijgebouwen en de omliggende terreinen
Old house ^{(nl)} ^{(fr)}		Amay	rue P. Dubois n° 3	50.548621°N 5.316813°E	61003-CLT-0009-01 Info	
Area and buildings of "Aux terrasses" ^{(nl)} ^{(fr)}		Amay	Amay	50.549500°N 5.317307°E	61003-CLT-0010-01 Info	
Church of St. George and St. Ode, excepting the organ ^{(nl)} ^{(fr)}		Amay		50.548677°N 5.317494°E	61003-PEX-0001-01 Info	Ensemble met collegiale kerk van Saint-Georges et Sainte-Ode, uitgezonderd het orgel (instrumentaal deel en buffet)
Cellar of Roman tower ^{(nl)} ^{(fr)}		Amay		50.545839°N 5.317381°E	61003-PEX-0002-01 Info	Donjon van de romaanse toren
Organ and buffet of church of St. Matthew ^{(nl)} ^{(fr)}		Amay		50.558439°N 5.336321°E	61003-PEX-0003-01 Info	
Facade and roof of castle Jehay ^{(nl)} ^{(fr)}		Jehay-Bodegnée Amay		50.577290°N 5.323305°E	61003-PEX-0004-01 Info	Gevels, daken en kelders van het kasteel van Jehay

== See also ==
- List of protected heritage sites in Liège (province)
- Amay
