= Villers-sur-Lesse =

Villers-sur-Lesse Viyé-so-Lesse (Walloon)
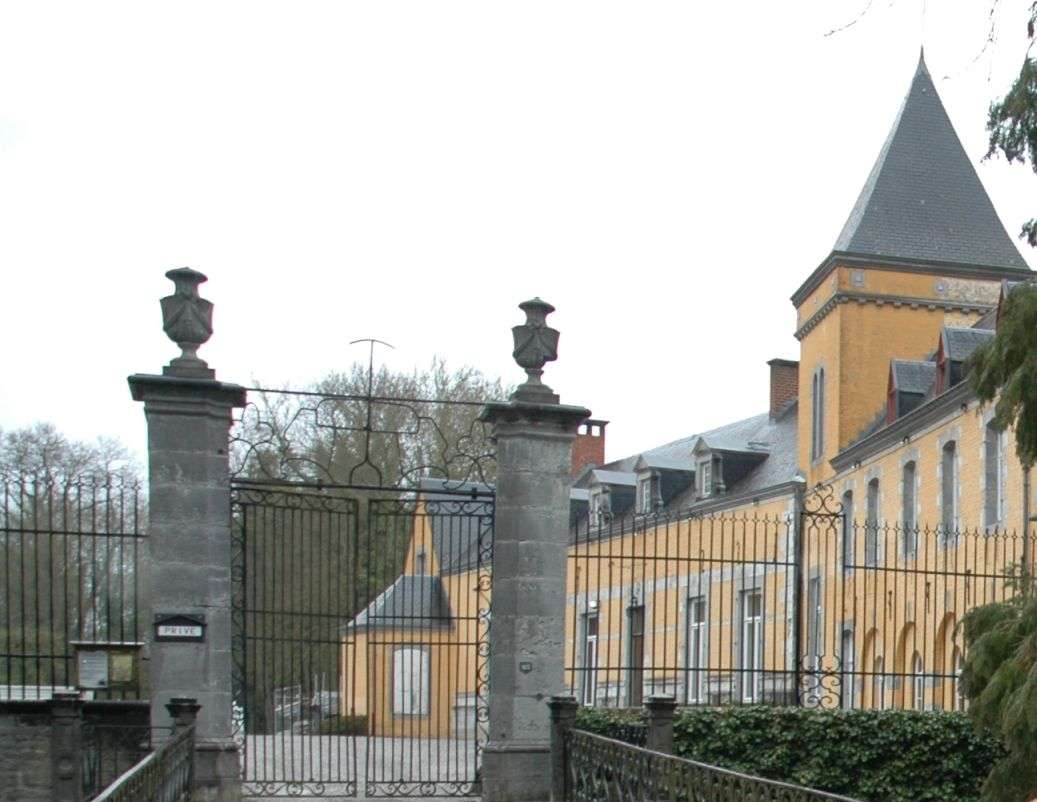
- Château of Villers-sur-Lesse

- Location within Belgium Location within Europe
- Coordinates: 50°09′10″N 05°06′54″E
- Country: Belgium
- Region: Wallonia
- Province: Namur
- Municipality: Rochefort

Villers-sur-Lesse (Walloon: Viyé-so-Lesse) is a village of Wallonia and a district of the municipality of Rochefort, located in the province of Namur, Belgium.

In the Middle Ages, the village was a small fief, held by a vassal of the Prince-Bishop of Liège. The Château de Villers-sur-Lesse dates from the 14th century and was acquired by the Royal family of Belgium in 1892. In the 1930s, the future King Leopold III and Princess Astrid spent their time here on several occasions. It is today a part of the Royal Trust. In Villers-sur-Lesse there are also two historical fortified farms.
