= Royal Castle of Ciergnon =

Belgian royal residence in Ciergnon, Belgium

- Part of Royal Trust (Belgium)
- Wallonia, Belgium
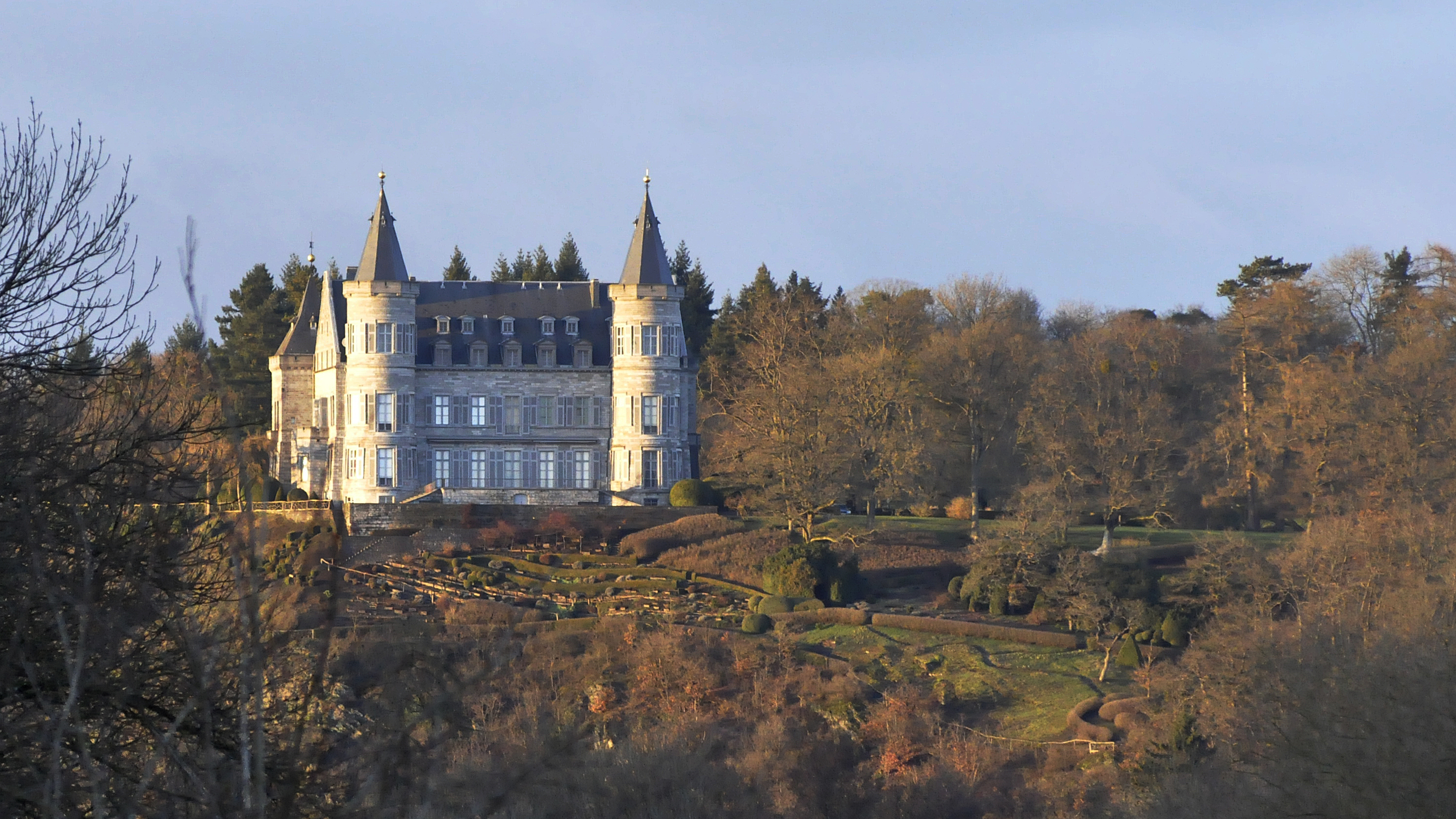
- Ciergnon Castle

Site information
- Type: Hunting lodge

Location
- Coordinates: 50.1662°N 5.1081°E

Site history
- Built: 1842
- Built by: King Leopold I of Belgium
- In use: Vacation home of the Belgian royal family

The Royal Castle of Ciergnon (French: Château Royal de Ciergnon; Dutch: Koninklijk Kasteel van Ciergnon) or Ciergnon Castle (French: Château de Ciergnon; Dutch: Kasteel van Ciergnon) is a residence and summer retreat of the Belgian royal family situated near the town of Ciergnon in the municipality of Houyet, Namur Province, Wallonia. The castle is a property of the Belgian Royal Trust.

== History ==
The domain with its woods, river and vast hunting grounds was acquired in 1840 by King Leopold I at the request of his spouse Queen Louise-Marie. At first, a hunting lodge was erected on a beautiful terrace overlooking a deep forested valley. The present château was erected later by King Leopold II. The edifice was designed by his court architect Alphonse Balat.

Since then, the château has always served as a holiday retreat to the Belgian royal family. In 1960, it was the venue for the press presentation of King Baudouin's fiancé Dona Fabiola de Mora y Aragon. More recently, the children of King Philippe—Princess Elisabeth, Duchess of Brabant, Prince Gabriel, Prince Emmanuel and Princess Eléonore—were baptized in the château's chapel.

The royal family also owned other castles and châteaux in the direct vicinity of Ciergnon. Fenffe Castle is still in use as a holiday retreat by the royal family. The Royal Château of Ardenne was, according to the wish of Leopold II, converted into a luxury hotel. It was closed after World War II and destroyed by fire in 1968.

== See also ==
- List of castles and châteaux in Belgium
- Culture of Belgium
- Belgium in the long nineteenth century
