= Werner van den Steen de Jehay =

Belgian diplomat

Werner van den Steen de Jehay (11 July 1854, Ghent – 1 October 1934, Rome) was a Belgian diplomat. He was of noble birth, and had missions in Belgrade and Rome. He was ambassador of Belgium to Italy from 1919 to 1924.

== Family ==
Werner van de Steen is the son of Louis van den Steen de Jehay (1812-1864) and Alix Mélanie Célestine (v. 1828–1859), countess of Gourcy Serainchamps.

He married Marguerite Julien (1868-1951), and together they had two children.

- Herbert (1896-1958). Married Jeanne Gabrielle Bertha Hoepfner (1900-1978) 30 April 1931 in Paris, 19th arrondissement^{[1]}.
  - Serge (born 1923). x1 Claude Ruffin (born 1931) 23 April 1957; x2 Annie Bonivert; x3 (7 November 1964) Josette Weerts (born 1928)
  - Béatrice (born 1930). Married Frédéric Sépulchre (Jupille-sur-Meuse, 10 August 1929 - Woluwe-Saint-Pierre, 29 February 2016^{[2]}) 12 June 1952. Produced six children^{[3]}.
  - Jérôme Herman Ernest Gaëtan vdS (born in Paris, 10th arrondissement, 15 August 1933 - 2014). x1 (30 November 1957 in Méan; religious marriage in Bruxelles on 20 December 1957) Marie-Antoinette Louise Jeanne Ghislaine Josèphe du Bois de Bounam de Ryckholt (born 31 January 1937, Etterbeek); x2 Marie-Jeanne Lemonde-Vanden Bruel.
- Guy vdS de Jehay (1906-1999).

== Works ==
- Rapport sur la production et le commerce des lins dans la Grande Bretagne et en Irlande, Impr. des travaux publics, 1893.
- Rapport sur les conditions de l'agriculture dans le Royaume-Uni, Impr. des travaux publics, 1893.

== Honours ==
- 1922: Knight Grand Cross in the Order of Leopold II.
