= John Youens =

The Venerable John Youens CB OBE MC
- Born: John Ross Youens; 29 September 1914
- Died: 24 August 1993 (aged 78)
- Spouse: Pamela
- Relatives: Three children
- Military career
- Allegiance: United Kingdom
- Branch: British Army
- Service years: 1940–1974
- Rank: Major General
- Service number: 135241
- Units: Third Infantry Division; British Army of the Rhine
- Commands: Royal Army Chaplains' Department
- Conflicts: World War II; Cold War
- Awards: Military Cross (1946)

John Ross Youens, CB, OBE, MC (29 September 1914 – 24 August 1993) was a Church of England priest and senior British Army officer. He served as Chaplain-General to the Forces from 1966 to 1974.

== Early life ==
Youens was born on 29 September 1914 to Canon Fernley Algernon Youens. He was educated at Buxton College, a boys' grammar school in Derbyshire.

Youens chose to follow his father in the Church. He trained for the priesthood at Kelham Theological College, a theological college that, unusually for the time, took non-graduates. He was ordained a deacon in the Church of England in 1939 at Southwark Cathedral. He was ordained a priest the following year.

== Military career ==
Youens volunteered to join the military near the start of World War II. He was commissioned in the Royal Army Chaplains' Department, British Army, on 2 July 1940 as a Chaplain to the Forces 4th class (equivalent in rank to captain). During the war he served as a military chaplain in European theatre and the Middle East theatre. His experiences of working alongside wounded and dying men in the heat of battle allowed him to realise how ill-prepared chaplains were through their theological training for this line of work. He suggested the formation of battle-school to teach chaplains additional skills; this was acted upon and chaplains received additional, specialised training in the latter parts of the war. On 13 February 1943, he transferred from an emergency commission to a temporary commission. At the end of the war, he was an acting Chaplain to the Forces 3rd class (equivalent in rank to major).

He remained in the forces after the end of the war. On 24 December 1945, he transferred from a temporary commission to a permanent commission and revered to the rank of Chaplain to the Forces 4th class. His first posting was as senior chaplain of the Royal Military Academy Sandhurst. There, he developed a regular session of religious and moral instruction for the officer cadets known as the 'Padre's Hours'. On 8 November 1948, he was promoted to Chaplain to the Forces 3rd class.

He was appointed senior chaplain to the Third Infantry Division. Under the command of Major General Lashmer Whistler, they were posted to Egypt as part of the Middle East Land Forces. Whistler himself was a devout Christian and instigated a trip to Mount Sinai for Youens and the other chaplains of the unit. There, Youens read out the Ten Commandments and then discussed with the other chaplains how best to minister to the soldiers under their care. When his unit relocated to Palestine, he arranged for trips to visit Jerusalem, Bethlehem and other biblical sites; over 7,000 soldiers benefited from this scheme. He was promoted to Chaplain to the Forces 2nd class (equivalent in rank to lieutenant colonel) on 20 May 1953.

In 1960, he was posted to Germany upon taking up the appointment of Assistant Chaplain General to the British Army of the Rhine (BAOR). During that posting, he arranged a visit to the BAOR by the newly appointed Archbishop of Canterbury, The Most Reverend Michael Ramsey. The Archbishop addressed a gathering of chaplains during his visit and thanked them for ministering to the soldiers and their families in a foreign country. He also noted the military's role at that point in the Cold War was as a forces in defence of peace.

On 8 February 1966, he was appointed Chaplain-General to the Forces and promoted to major general. He succeeded Ivan Neill who later became Provost of Sheffield Cathedral. As Chaplain General, he was head of the Royal Army Chaplains' Department. Youens, as an act of ecumenism, appointed the Rev Dr David Whiteford, a minister of the Church of Scotland, as Deputy Chaplain-General. On 14 November 1973, he attended the Wedding of Princess Anne and Mark Phillips held at Westminster Abbey; unusually, he was part of the visiting clergy because Phillips was a serving British Army officer. During his time as Chaplain-General, the first book of services and prayer was drawn up specifically for military chaplains and distributed across the forces.

On 1 July 1974, he retired from the British Army. He was succeeded as Chaplain-General by Peter Mallett.

== Later life ==
In 1978, Youens appeared before a Magistrate having been charged with 'insulting behaviour likely to cause a breach of the peace'. Two police officers stated that they had seen him lift up a girl's skirt, behind whom he was standing, a number of times while watching a tennis match at Wimbledon. The girl was identified as 14 years old. Youens argued that he was in fact unconsciously exercising his left hand; he had undergone surgery on it two years before to cure Dupuytren's contracture and he needed to regularly exercise the hand to keep the circulation going. Having heard a character witness from General Sir John Mogg, the judge found him not guilty. Speaking to the press following the court hearing he stated: 'I'm absolutely delighted my name has been cleared and all I want to do is forget'.

From 1982 to 1984, he served as Senior Treasurer of the Corporation of the Sons of the Clergy.

He died on 24 August 1993, aged 78. He was cremated at a private service and no memorial service was held at his request.

== Personal life ==
Youens was married to Pamela. Together they had three children; two daughters and a son. Youens officiated at the wedding of his son Richard in March 1972.

His daughter Georgina was a London-based model. She was killed aged 22, when Turkish Airlines Flight 981 crashed near Paris on 3 March 1974. It is the fourth-deadliest plane crash in aviation history. She had been married to Piers Weld-Forester, son of Lady Moyra Butler and grandson of George Butler, 5th Marquess of Ormonde. Piers was a professional motorcyclist and royal courtier, who died in a motorcycle crash in 1977.

== Honours and decorations ==
In January 1946, he was awarded the Military Cross (MC) 'in recognition of gallant and distinguished services in North West Europe'. In the 1959 New Year Honours, he was appointed Officer of the Order of the British Empire (OBE). On 1 October 1963, he was appointed Honorary Chaplain to the Queen (QHC). In the 1970 New Year Honours, he was appointed Companion of the Order of the Bath (CB).
