= Court of assizes (Belgium) =

Criminal court in Belgium

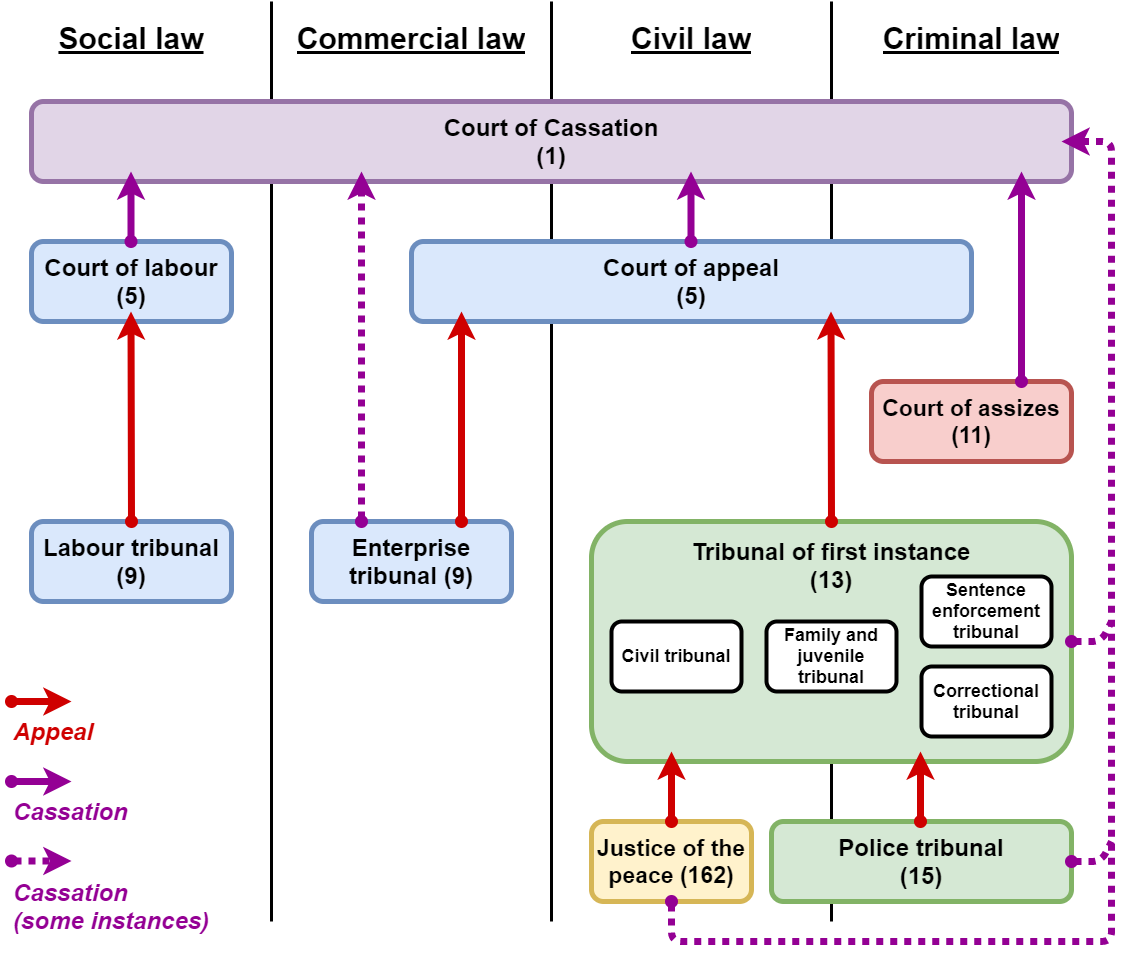
Belgian judicial hierarchy (2018).

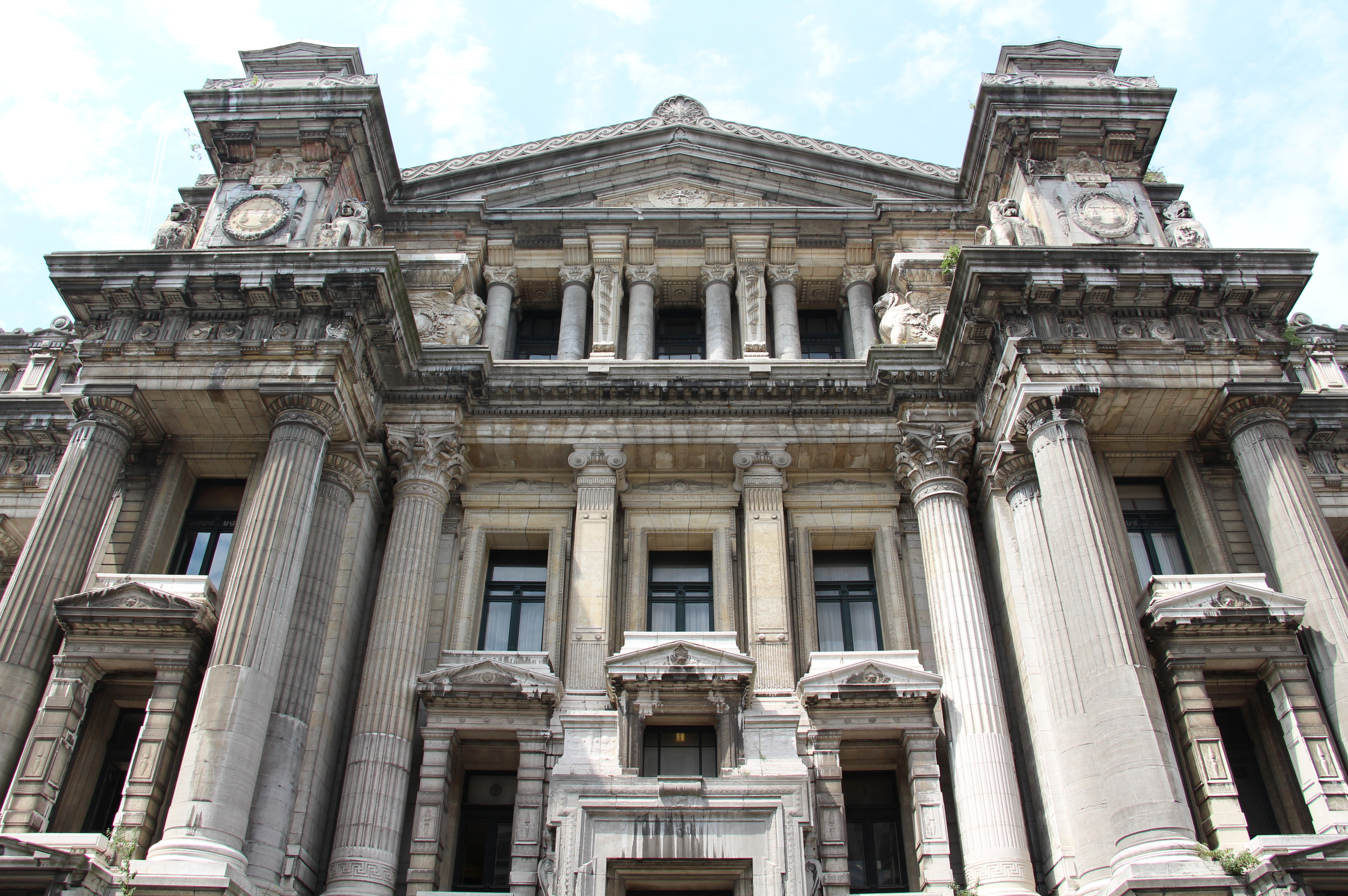
The Brussels court of assizes has its seat in the city's Palace of Justice.

The court of assizes (Dutch: hof van assisen, French: cour d'assises, German: Assisenhof) is the trial court which tries the most serious crimes in the judicial system of Belgium. It is the highest Belgian court with criminal jurisdiction; as such, it is the only Belgian court that can sentence someone to life imprisonment. The courts of assizes are not permanent courts; a new court of assizes is assembled for each new trial. There is a court of assizes in each of the ten provinces of Belgium, as well as one in the arrondissement of Brussels-Capital which is not part of any province. Further below, an overview is provided of the eleven courts of assizes and their seats. They are the only courts in Belgium for which the provinces are used as territorial subdivisions. They are also the only courts in Belgium that hold jury trials. The jury acts as sole trier of fact, but decides on the penalty together with the judges. The trial by jury of certain crimes is laid down in article 150 of the Belgian Constitution. The Belgian courts of assizes have the same origin as their French namesakes.

The organisation of the courts of assizes and the applicable rules of criminal procedure are laid down in the Belgian Judicial Code and the Belgian Code of Criminal Procedure. The language in which the proceedings of the courts of assizes are held depends on the official languages of their province: Dutch for the courts of assizes of Antwerp, Limburg, East Flanders, West Flanders and Flemish Brabant, Dutch and French for the court of assizes of Brussels, French for the courts of assizes of Walloon Brabant, Hainaut, Namur and Luxembourg, French and German for the court of assizes of Liège. The use of languages in judicial matters is a sensitive topic in Belgium; it is strictly regulated by the law.

== Court structure ==
=== Judges ===
A court of assizes is presided over by a counsellor (Dutch: raadsheer, French: conseiller, German: Gerichtsrat) from the court of appeal (judges at the courts of appeal are officially called counsellors), who is assisted by two assessors (Dutch: assessor, French: assesseur, German: Beisitzer), who are judges from the tribunal of first instance. These three judges are appointed to each assizes trial by the first president of the court of appeal. They sit together in the form of a panel, led by the counsellor of the court of appeal. For the sake of readability, the counsellor will be referred to as the 'presiding judge' in this article. In order to distinguish the different ranks of the judges, the two assessors from the tribunal of first instance wear their black court robes with white band, whilst the counsellor from the court of appeal wears a ceremonial court robe that uses the color red in addition to black. The judges are always assisted by a clerk. In exceptional cases, alternate judges can be appointed to an assizes trial as well, who will replace a judge who can no longer serve for no matter which reason during the trial.

=== Jury ===
The court of assizes is, aside from the three judges, also composed of a jury of twelve people. These twelve jurors (Dutch: gezworene, French: juré, German: Geschworener) are selected at random off the electoral rolls used for the Belgian federal elections. However, a jury may not count more than eight people of the same sex; a jury with fewer than four men or four women may thus not be impaneled. In order to be selected as a juror, one must be aged between 28 and 65, be able to read and write in the language of the trial, not be a cleric, the holder of certain public offices or in active military service, not be disqualified from the exercise of civil and political rights by means of a judgement, and not have received a criminal sentence above a certain threshold. Up to twenty-four alternate jurors can be selected as well. Serving on an assizes jury is considered to be a civic duty and legally obligated; a potential juror may thus not be dismissed from their jury duty without a valid reason. Jurors do however receive a stipend for their service. Since the jurors are not merely triers of fact, but also have a say over the penalty, they can also be viewed as lay judges.

=== Prosecution, accused and civil parties ===
Since the court of assizes is not a permanent court, there is no public prosecutor's office attached to it. The prosecution of (suspected) offenders is undertaken by the prosecutor-general's office (Dutch: parket-generaal, French: parquet général, German: Generalstaatsanwaltschaft) attached to the court of appeal. The prosecutor-general's office may also delegate the prosecution to a lower prosecutor's office. The defendant in an assizes trial is referred to as the accused (Dutch: beschuldigde, French: accusé, German: Angeklagter). The accused is required to be assisted by counsel; if they have not picked one, the court will appoint one to them. Any accused who does not speak the language of the trial will be appointed an interpreter by the court as well. Any victim in a case can also bring a civil action against the accused in an assizes trial. It is a feature of the Belgian judicial system in general that courts and tribunals having jurisdiction over criminal cases can also decide on any civil damages sought by a victim (referred to as the civil party). A judgement made by a court of assizes is literally called an 'arrest' (Dutch: arrest, French: arrêt, German: Entscheid) in order to distinguish it from the judgements of lower tribunals; it might also be translated into English as a 'decision' or 'ruling'. For the sake of readability, the term 'judgement' will be used in this article.

=== Courtroom layout ===
The courtroom where a court of assizes is held requires a particular layout due to the presence of a jury. In general, the three judges (with the presiding judge in the middle) sit behind a bench at the back of the courtroom, with the prosecutor-general or his delegate sitting on one side and the court clerk sitting on the other side next to the bench. The accused, guarded by police officers, sits in a box to the same side of the courtroom as where the prosecutor-general or his delegate sits, with the defense counsel sitting in front of the box. In some cases, the accused's box may be fitted with bulletproof glass. To the other side of the courtroom, opposite the accused's box and to the same side as the court clerk, is the jury box where the jury sits. In the middle of the courtroom, in between the bench, the accused's box and the jury box, is the witness stand where witnesses testify. At the front of the courtroom are benches for the civil parties and the news media, with seats for the general public in front of those. The courtroom is often fitted with television screens or video projectors meant to display video evidence or presentations by expert witnesses. The details of the individual layout may of course vary from courtroom to courtroom.

== Jurisdiction ==
=== Serious crimes ===
The courts of assizes have original jurisdiction over all crimes (Dutch: misdaad, French: crime, German: Verbrechen) that have not been correctionalised. Crimes are the most serious category of crimes under Belgian law (comparable to major felonies); correctionalisation refers to the process which allows for certain crimes to be tried by the correctional division of a tribunal of first instance instead of a court of assizes. The process of correctionalisation requires the prosecutor to assume the existence of extenuating circumstances. A consequence of a decision to correctionalise is also that the statutory maximum penalty that can be imposed for the crime is lowered. The decision on whether to correctionalise a crime is either taken by the prosecutor, or either by the judge's chambers (Dutch: raadkamer, French: chambre du conseil, German: Ratskammer) of the tribunal of first instance or the chamber of indictment (Dutch: kamer van inbeschuldigingstelling, French: chambre des mises en accusation, German: Anklagekammer) of the court of appeal, at the end of a judicial investigation or during the indictment proceedings (see further below).

In practice, most crimes except for the most severe ones are correctionalised due to the heavy burden an assizes trial imposes on the judicial system. This heavy burden is caused by, amongst other factors, the fact three judges need to be temporarily discharged from their other duties, the number of witnesses that are often made to testify, and therefore the long time an assizes trial can last. Some high-profile ones can even last for months. As a result, most of the assizes trials held involve a homicide (murder or manslaughter) or other crimes of a grave nature. In this capacity, some extraordinary crimes against international law, such as genocide or crimes against humanity, are also tried by the courts of assizes.

=== Political and press crimes ===
Aside from the most serious crimes, article 150 of the Belgian Constitution also establishes that political crimes and press crimes (except those inspired by racism or xenophobia) have to be tried by a jury. As a result, the courts of assizes have exclusive jurisdiction over these types of crimes. In addition, article 148 of the Belgian Constitution establishes that trials of political and press crimes are held in open court, unless the court and all parties involved agree to hold the trial behind closed doors. However, neither the Constitution nor the law provides for a definition of what constitutes a political crime or press crime. As a result, the scope of these terms has historically been interpreted rather restrictively by Belgian courts. Through precedent and legal theory, political crimes can be defined as crimes that, by their intention and their effect, constitute a direct attack on the functioning of the institutions of the state. In the same way, press crimes can be defined as the expression, in print or by similar means, of an idea or opinion that breaches the law, as long as the print in question is effectively published.

== Procedure ==
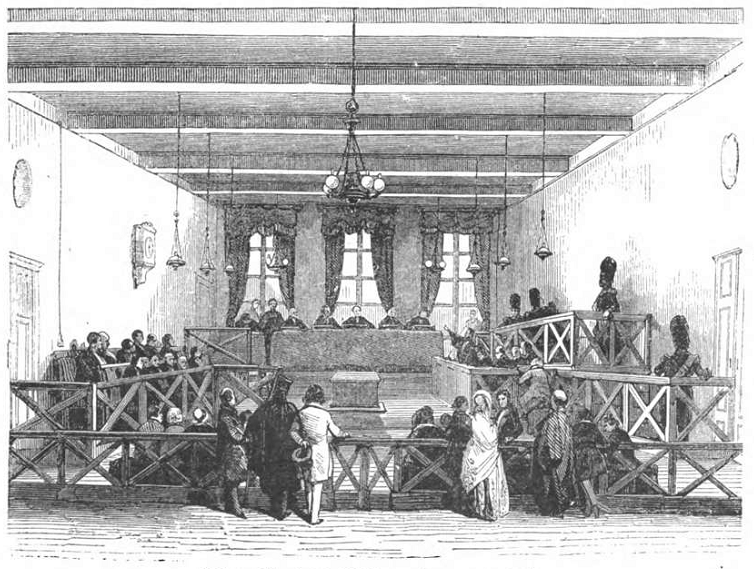
Courtroom sketch of a trial before the court of assizes of Brussels (1843).

=== Indictment ===
Unlike for trials before the police tribunals and tribunals of first instance, no-one may be prosecuted before a court of assizes without a prior indictment (Dutch: inbeschuldigingstelling, French: mise en accusation, German: Versetzung in den Anklagezustand) by the chamber of indictment of the court of appeal. This indictment can be obtained after a judicial investigation conducted by an investigative judge of the tribunal of first instance. Such judicial investigations are overseen by the council chamber, which is chaired by another judge of the tribunal of first instance. If the council chamber decides at the end of such a judicial investigation that there are sufficient indications of guilt of a crime that should not be correctionalised (see earlier), it will send the case to the chamber of indictment, which is chaired by a panel of three counsellors of the court of appeal. If the chamber of indictment decides as well that there exist sufficient indications of guilt, and that the suspected crime should not be correctionalised, it will deliver an indictment for an assizes trial. The decision made by the chamber of indictment in this capacity is final except for an appeal in cassation. A court of assizes will then be assembled to hold the trial, except when in the case of cassation proceedings the Court of Cassation quashes the indictment. Once the decision is made to hold an assizes trial, the prosecutor-general (Dutch: procureur-generaal, French: procureur général, German: Generalprokurator) or his delegate who will prosecute the accused, is required to draw up an act of accusation (Dutch: akte van beschuldiging, French: acte d'accusation, German: Anklageschrift), which describes the criminal charges brought against the accused. The accused's defense may also draw up an act of defense (Dutch: akte van verdediging, French: acte de défense, German: Verteidigungsschrift) as a response to the act of accusation, but this is not required.

=== Preliminary hearing ===
Before the start of the assizes trial, the presiding judge holds a preliminary hearing with the accused and the civil parties (or their counsel). During this preliminary hearing, the presiding judge will decide on the witnesses that will testify during the trial, and in which order and on which moment their testimony will be scheduled. The prosecution, the accused, and any civil party may propose witnesses to be heard. They will either testify as to facts and guilt, either as to the morality and character of the accused, or as to both. Experts who were involved in the pre-trial investigation, such as medical examiners or forensic psychiatrists, may be called upon as expert witnesses in order to clarify their findings. The presiding judge may object to any proposed witness if their testimony appears to be trivial and useless to the trial. In any case, the testimony of the police officers who made the first observations in the case, as well as that of the police officers who investigated the morality and the character of the accused, must always be heard. The witnesses agreed upon are legally obligated to testify and receive a summons as to when they have to do so.

=== Jury selection ===
At least twenty days before the start of the assizes trial, a list of no less than sixty potential jurors is compiled. All of these potential jurors will receive a summons for the jury selection, which will happen at least two business days before the start of the trial. At the beginning of the jury selection, the presiding judge removes any potential juror who does not (longer) meet the criteria to serve as juror, or who has a valid reason not to serve as one, from the list. Out of the remaining potential jurors, twelve are then selected at random who will effectively serve. Additionally, up to twenty-four alternate jurors may be selected as well, depending on the nature of the case and how long the trial is expected to last. The prosecution, the accused and the civil parties (or their counsel) all have the right of peremptory challenge; they each may object to half the number of (effective and alternate) jurors at most, without giving a reason for their objection. The presiding judge may only object to a juror in order to ensure there are at least four men and four women on the jury. The selected jurors are definitively impaneled after swearing an oath. Before the start of the actual trial, the jurors attend an information session informing them of the conduct of the trial and their rights and duties.

=== Trial hearings ===
The actual trial is held orally, due to the jurors not having access to the documents and reports resulting from the pre-trial investigation. During the hearings, the jurors are permitted to take notes. They have the duty to be attentive and impartial; if they appear to be inattentive or partial, they can be removed from the trial and replaced by an alternate juror. They also have the duty to refrain from any contact with outsiders and the news media, and not allow themselves to be influenced by any outside pressure. The presiding judge enjoys an important discretionary power during the trial to order any additional investigative measure he considers necessary to bring the truth to light (which is a feature of the Belgian judicial system in general). In this capacity, the presiding judge has to act both à charge and à décharge, which means they have to faithfully examine and consider all elements to the benefit and to the detriment of the accused. Such legal systems, where judges are actively involved in truth finding, are often referred to as inquisitorial systems.

- Reading of the acts of accusation and defense: the trial begins with the prosecutor-general or his delegate reading the act of accusation for the court and jury, describing the criminal charges brought against the accused. Then the accused's defense may read its act of defense (if they have prepared one). The jurors receive a copy of both acts.
- Investigation at the hearing: after the reading of both acts, the entire pre-trial investigation is gone over during the hearings, which involves the examination of all witnesses and evidence. This is often referred to as the 'investigation at the hearing' (Dutch: onderzoek ter terechtzitting, French: instruction à l'audience, German: Untersuchung in der Sitzung). The first step in the investigation at the hearing is the presiding judge questioning the accused on the charges brought against him or her. The next step is that the testimony of all witnesses are heard in the order established during the preliminary hearing. Before being questioned, the witnesses swear an oath "to speak the whole truth and nothing but the truth"; they are required to speak the truth under penalty of perjury. However, family members of the accused are exempt from testifying under oath. The witnesses are first questioned by the presiding judge. Then the prosecution, the defense and the civil parties may question the witnesses, regardless of which party proposed the witness. This step involves direct examination as well as cross-examination. Unlike some other legal systems, there are little rules about which questions can and cannot be posed to witnesses (for example regarding hearsay). The jurors may pose questions to the witnesses as well through the presiding judge, as long as these are not partial. During the trial, the presiding judge may decide to summon any additional witness, who was not stipulated during the preliminary hearing, to testify. In some high-profile cases, hundreds of witnesses are sometimes summoned, and the time necessary for all of them to testify can take weeks.
- Pleas: after the investigation at the hearing is finished (meaning all witnesses have been heard and all evidence is examined), all parties get to make their case. First the civil parties and the prosecution hold their pleadings, and then the defense, during which they bring forth their arguments regarding the facts and guilt, and any peculiar circumstance (either extenuating or aggravating). They all get the opportunity to reply to each other's pleadings as well. The accused or his defense counsel always has the last word.
- Questions to the jury: the presiding judge will then formulate the questions of fact the jury has to answer. These questions are always yes–no questions and are formulated along the lines of "is the accused guilty of crime X?" and "did the accused commit the crime under circumstance Y?" They follow from the criminal charges described in the act of accusation and any extenuating or aggravating circumstance discovered during the trial hearings and pleadings. Finally, the presiding judge instructs the jury on the conduct of the deliberation, and reminds the jurors of their duties and that they may only declare the accused guilty if his or her guilt is established beyond any reasonable doubt.

=== Jury deliberation on facts ===
The twelve jurors deliberate on the questions of fact posed together with the three judges in their deliberation room. They are not permitted to leave the room or to come in contact with outsiders before their verdict is rendered. At the end of the jury deliberation, the twelve jurors vote on all the questions posed to them through a secret ballot. The three judges do not have a vote over the questions posed to the jury. The jurors must only answer 'yes' if the guilt of the accused on the question posed is proven beyond any reasonable doubt. Ballots left blank are counted in favour of the accused (as a 'no'). If only six jurors (being half of the jury) or less vote 'yes', the accused is acquitted. If at least eight jurors (a qualified majority) vote 'yes', the accused is found guilty. In case the accused is only found guilty by a simple majority of the jurors (meaning seven voted 'yes' and five 'no'), the three judges decide on the question. The accused is found guilty if a majority of the judges (two of three) considers the accused guilty as well, otherwise the accused is acquitted on that question. Since there is no unanimity requirement, hung juries are not a possibility. After all questions posed have been answered this way, the jurors and judges draw up the motivation for the verdict, which must contain the main reasons as to why the accused is found guilty. In case the accused is found guilty, the three judges may declare a mistrial if all three of them agree the jurors are sorely mistaken either as to questions of fact or questions of law, as discovered during the drawing up of the motivation. This will result in the case being suspended and subjected to a new trial by three new judges and a new jury. After the verdict of the jury and the motivation are drawn up, they are pronounced in court by the presiding judge in the presence of the accused. If the accused is acquitted on the charges brought against him, the presiding judge orders his release. He cannot be retried on the charges the jury has acquitted him of. If the accused is found guilty, the sentencing hearings will immediately begin after the guilty verdict.

=== Sentencing ===
After a guilty verdict, the court will dismiss the charges if the law does not allow for a penalty to be imposed on the accused, such as when the statute of limitations has expired. If not the case, pleadings are held on the penalty to impose. The prosecution first brings forth its arguments regarding the penalty to impose, after which the accused's defense gets to bring forth its arguments. The defense may no longer contest the facts of which the accused has been found guilty by the jury. The civil parties have no say regarding the penalty. When the prosecution and defense have held their pleadings regarding the penalty, the judges and jurors will again retreat to their deliberation room. Contrary to the deliberation on the questions of fact, all of the three judges and twelve jurors have an equal vote over the penalty, and the vote is held orally instead of by a secret ballot. The penalty to be imposed needs to be provided for by law and to be agreed upon by a simple majority. If no majority for a certain penalty exists, the judges or jurors that supported the least favourable penalty to the accused are required to support one of the other proposed penalties, until one of the proposed penalties gains majority support. The judges and jurors then decide by a simple majority on the motivation for the penalty, which must mention the provisions of the law on which it is based. The sentence and its motivation are pronounced by the presiding judge in open court in the presence of the now convict. After pronouncing the sentence, the presiding judge informs the convict of the possibility of an appeal in cassation, and discharges the jurors of their duty which has been fulfilled.

=== Civil action ===
It is a feature of the Belgian judicial system in general, that the courts and tribunals which have jurisdiction over criminal cases, will also decide on any civil damages sought by a victim who is a civil party to the case. However, any civil action will only be heard after the accused is sentenced. Regarding the courts of assizes, only the three judges will decide on a civil action without the jury. The civil parties may first make their demands, and the defense may then argue there is no cause for damages or the damages sought by the civil parties are too high. The defense may not contest the facts for which the convict has been sentenced. The court will then render a civil judgement.

== Appeal in cassation ==
The judgements made by the courts of assizes are final as to questions of fact. Only an appeal in cassation on questions of law to the Court of Cassation, the supreme court in the judicial system of Belgium, is still possible. Such an appeal to the Court of Cassation is extraordinary procedure, and will result in the Court of Cassation either upholding or either quashing the contested judgement of the court of assizes. If the Court of Cassation does the latter, it will refer the case to a different court of assizes than were the case originated from, to be tried de novo (both on questions of fact and questions of law).

== Statistics ==
According to the statistics provided by the college of the courts and tribunals of Belgium, a judgement was rendered in 73 assizes trials in 2016. Due to a change in Belgian law which expanded the number of cases open to correctionalisation, which allows for crimes to be tried by the tribunals of first instance instead of the courts of assizes, the number of judgements rendered in assizes trials dropped to 30 in 2017.

== List of courts of assizes ==
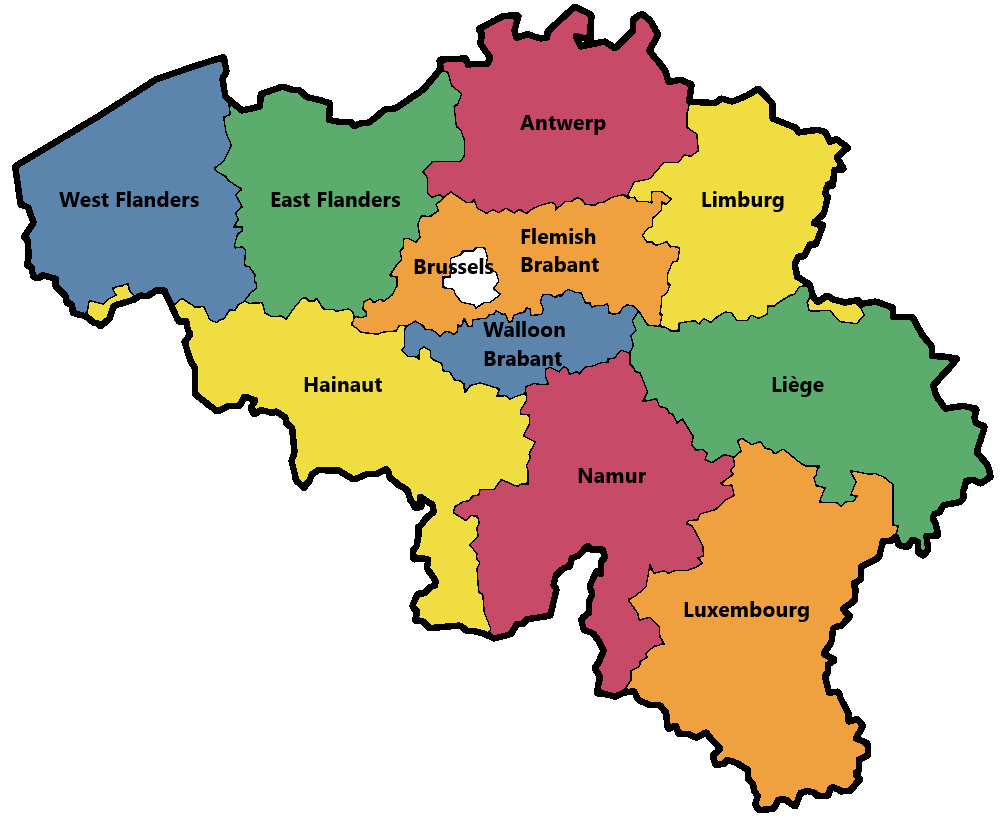
Map of the ten provinces of Belgium (and Brussels-Capital)

As of 2018, the court of assizes of each of the Belgian provinces (and Brussels-Capital) has its seat in the following municipalities:

- Court of assizes of Antwerp: in Antwerp
- Court of assizes of Limburg: in Tongeren
- Court of assizes of East Flanders: in Ghent
- Court of assizes of West Flanders: in Bruges
- Court of assizes of Brussels-Capital: in Brussels
- Court of assizes of Flemish Brabant: in Leuven
- Court of assizes of Walloon Brabant: in Nivelles
- Court of assizes of Hainaut: in Mons
- Court of assizes of Namur: in Namur
- Court of assizes of Liège: in Liège
- Court of assizes of Luxembourg: in Arlon

== See also ==
- Judiciary of Belgium
- War Crimes Law (Belgium)
- Assizes
