= Court of appeal (Belgium) =

Appellate court in Belgium

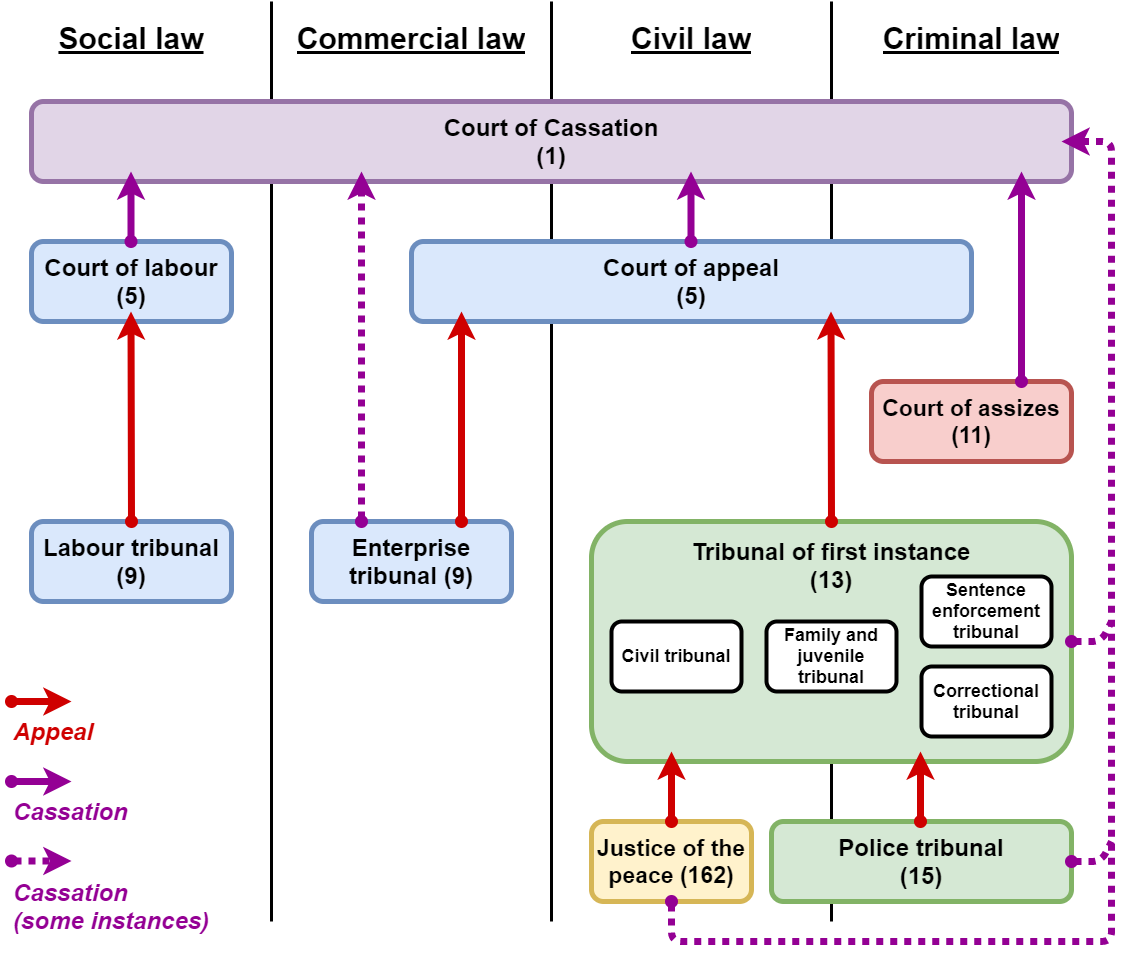
Belgian judicial hierarchy (2018).

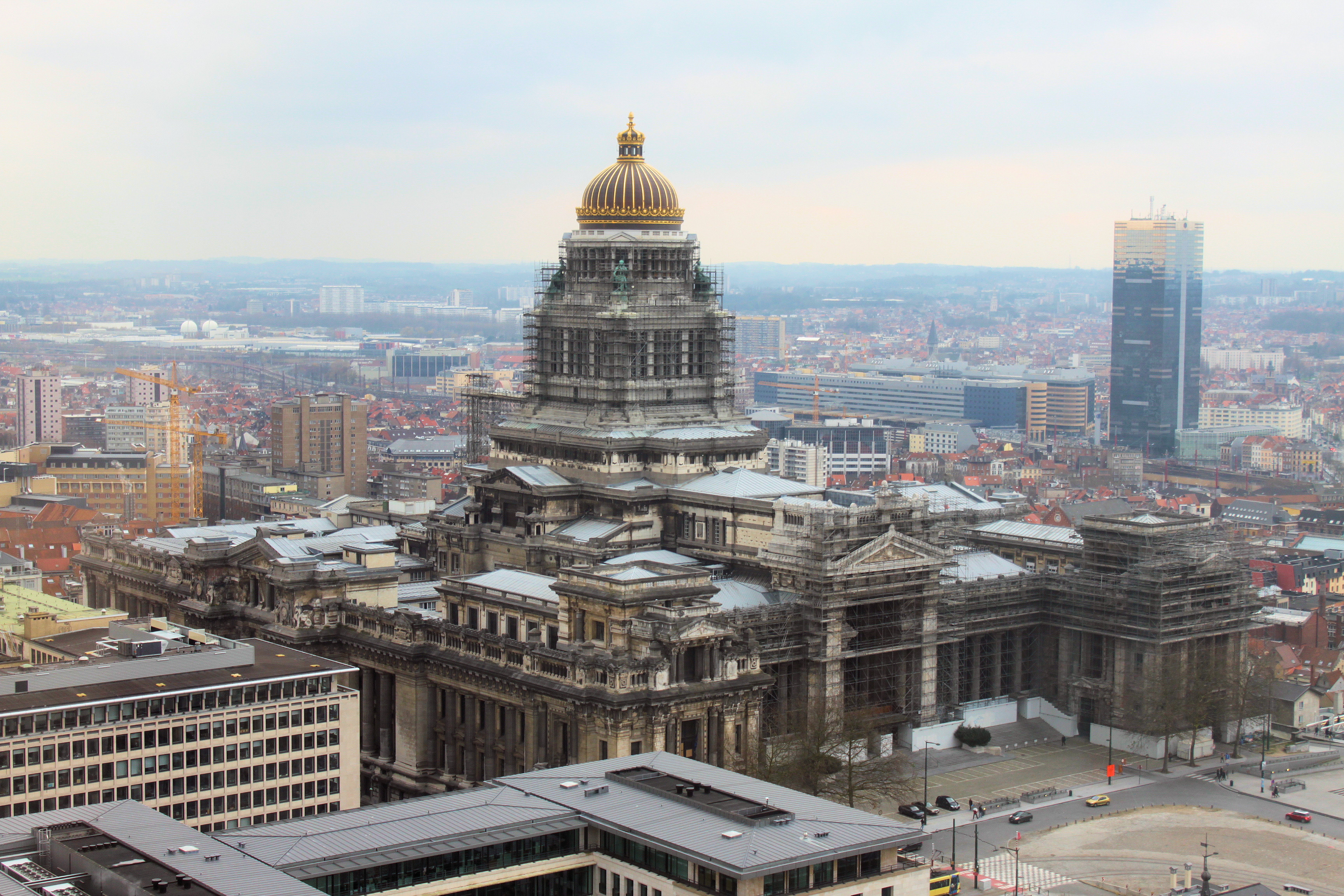
The court of appeal of Brussels has its seat in the city's Palace of Justice.

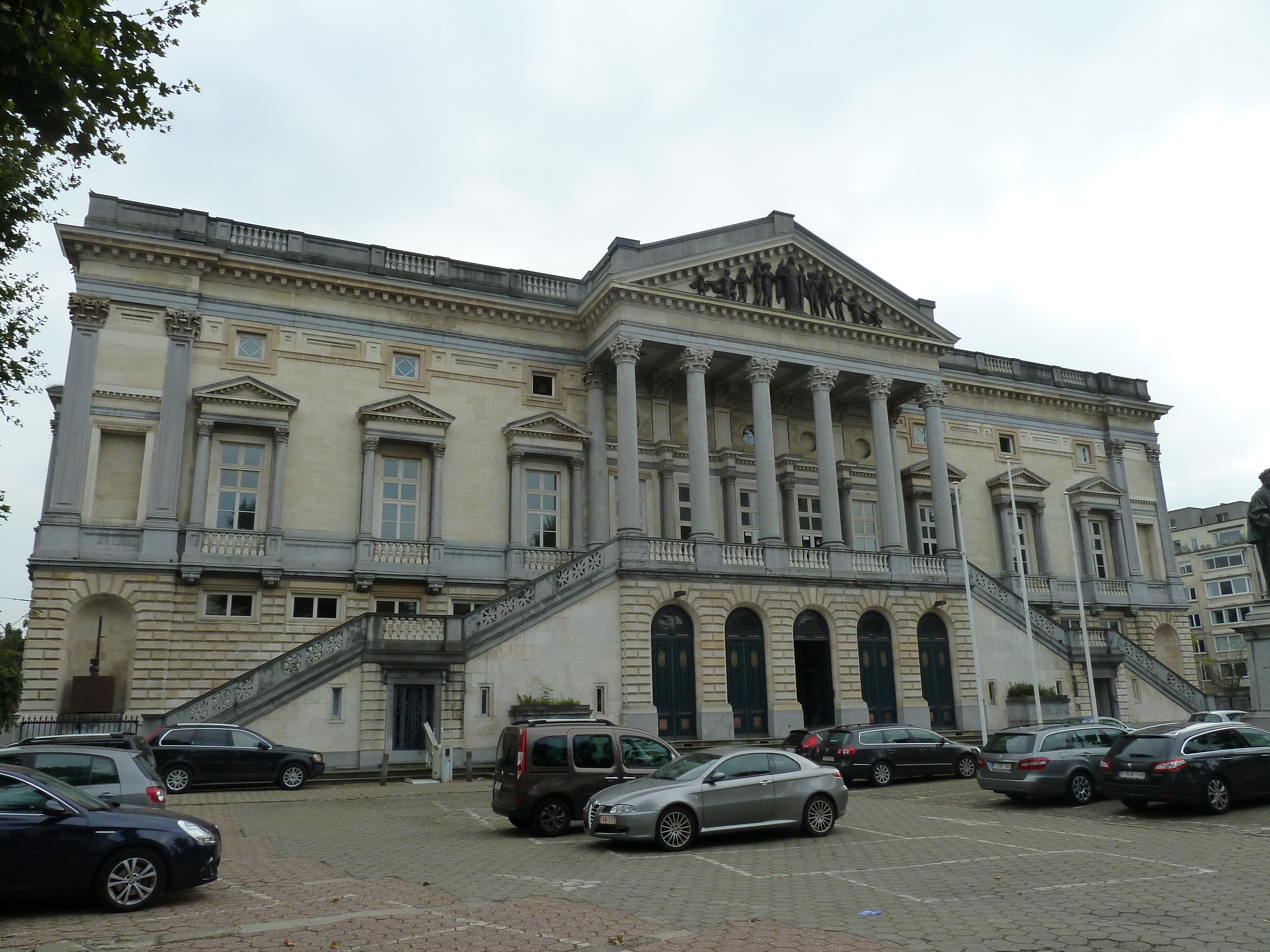
Court building where the court of appeal of Ghent is seated.

The courts of appeal (Dutch: hof van beroep, French: cour d'appel, German: Appellationshof) are the main appellate courts in the judicial system of Belgium, which hear appeals against judgements of the tribunals of first instance, the enterprise tribunals and the presidents of those tribunals in their judicial area. There are five courts of appeal for each of the five judicial areas, which are the largest geographical subdivisions of Belgium for judicial purposes. The division of the Belgian territory into the five judicial areas (Antwerp, Brussels, Ghent, Liège and Mons) is laid down in article 156 of the Belgian Constitution. A judicial area covers multiple judicial arrondissements ("districts"), except for the judicial area of Mons. Each arrondissement has a tribunal of first instance. Further below, an overview is provided of the five courts of appeal and the judicial arrondissements their judicial area covers. The courts of appeal do not hear appeals against judgements of the labour tribunals; these are heard by the courts of labour.

The organisation of the courts of appeal and the applicable rules of civil procedure and criminal procedure are laid down in the Belgian Judicial Code and the Belgian Code of Criminal Procedure. The language in which the proceedings of the courts of appeal are held depends on the official languages of their judicial areas: Dutch for the courts of appeal of Antwerp and Ghent, Dutch and French for the court of appeal of Brussels, French for the court of appeal of Mons, and French and German for the court of appeal of Liège. The use of languages in judicial matters is a sensitive topic in Belgium, and is strictly regulated by the law.

== Court structure ==
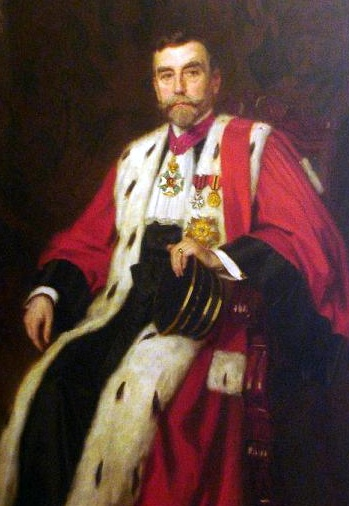
Adrien baron de la Kéthulle de Ryhove, first president of the court of appeal of Ghent from 1919 to 1923.

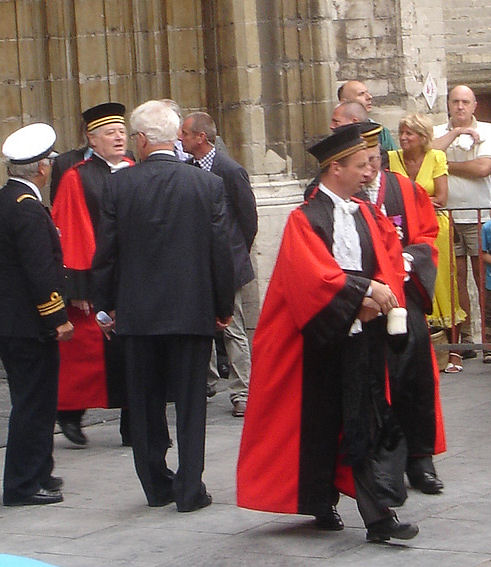
Magistrates of the court of appeal of Ghent leaving St Bavo's Cathedral after the solemn Te Deum on the National Holiday

Unlike the tribunals of first instance, the courts of appeal are not divided into different sections (except for the Market Court, see further below), but they consist of a number of chambers based on the matters they hear nonetheless. There are chambers for civil and enterprise matters, chambers for criminal matters and chambers for family and juvenile matters. A special chamber is the chamber of indictment (Dutch: kamer van inbeschuldigingstelling, French: chambre des mises en accusation, German: Anklagekammer), which hears appeals in judicial investigations and decides on certain indictments (see further below).

A judge in the court of appeal is called a counsellor (Dutch: raadsheer, French: conseiller, German: Gerichtsrat). They are professional, law-trained magistrates who are, like all judges in Belgium, appointed for life until their retirement age. Lawyers or notaries can act as locum tenens counsellor. Appellate cases are heard by the different chambers of the courts of appeal, which are either chaired by a single counsellor or by a panel of three counsellors (depending on the nature and complexity of the case), assisted by a clerk. Both claimants and defendants in a case can be assisted or represented by counsel, but this is not required. The counsellor chairing the chamber (or panel) is referred to as the 'president of the chamber' or 'chairman of the chamber' (Dutch: kamervoorzitter, French: président de chambre, German: Kammerpräsident). The counsellor who holds the overall leadership position of the court of appeal is referred to as the 'first president' or 'first chairman' (Dutch: eerste voorzitter, French: premier président, German: erster Präsident). A judgement made by a court of appeal is literally called an 'arrest' (Dutch: arrest, French: arrêt, German: Entscheid) in order to distinguish it from the judgements of lower tribunals; it might also be translated into English as a 'decision' or 'ruling'. For the sake of readability, the term 'judgement' will be used in this article.

There is a public prosecutor's office attached to each court of appeal; these are referred to as a prosecutor-general's office (Dutch: parket-generaal, French: parquet général, German: Generalstaatsanwaltschaft). A prosecutor-general's office is led by a prosecutor-general (Dutch: procureur-generaal, French: procureur général, German: Generalprokurator). The prosecutor-general's office prosecutes (suspected) offenders in the criminal cases the court of appeal hears, and may provide a legal opinion to the court in other cases. The prosecutor-general also leads the auditorate-general (Dutch: auditoraat-generaal, French: auditorat général, German: Generalauditorat) attached to the corresponding court of labour. In some social-criminal cases, the auditorate-general prosecutes (suspected) offenders before the court of appeal instead of the prosecutor-general's office.

== Jurisdiction and procedures ==
=== Appellate jurisdiction ===
==== Judgements in first instance ====
The courts of appeal have appellate jurisdiction over the judgements made in first instance by the tribunals of first instance, the enterprise tribunals and the presidents of those tribunals in their respective judicial areas. The judgements made by the tribunals of first instance and the enterprise tribunals in petty civil cases where the disputed amount does not exceed 2,500 euro (as of September 2018) cannot be appealed to the courts of appeal however, except when the case concerns a tax dispute. The judgements of the tribunals of first instance on the appeals against judgements of the police tribunals or of the justices of the peace cannot be further appealed to the courts of appeal either. In these cases, the tribunals of first instance have already exercised appellate review; these judgements are thus final (except for an appeal in cassation).

==== Specific cases ====
The courts of appeal also have appellate jurisdiction over some specific cases, such as decisions on the inclusion or exclusion of voters on electoral rolls made by the college of mayor and aldermen of a municipality, decisions made by Belgian consuls outside of the Belgian territory, and judgements of the Belgian Prize Court. Over the latter two, only the court of appeal of Brussels has appellate jurisdiction.

=== Chamber of indictment ===
==== Appeals in judicial investigations ====
The judge's chambers (Dutch: raadkamer, French: chambre du conseil, German: Ratskammer) of a tribunal of first instance oversees the judicial investigations conducted by an investigative judge. In this role, the council chamber decides on the necessity of pre-trial detention, on whether sufficient indications of guilt exist for criminal charges at the end of a judicial investigation, or on extra investigative measures to be executed by the investigative judge, amongst other things. The prosecution, a (suspected) offender being charged, as well as any civil party to the case, can appeal any such decision of the council chamber at the chamber of indictment of the court of appeal, which is always chaired by a panel of three counsellors. The decision then made by the chamber of indictment is final (except for an appeal in cassation).

==== Indictments for court of assizes ====
The council chamber can not decide on all types of criminal charges however. It only decides on charges of delicts (Dutch: wanbedrijf, French: délit, German: Vergehen), which is the intermediate category of crimes more serious than contraventions but less serious than crimes under Belgian law (comparable to misdemeanors or lesser felonies), as well as on charges of crimes (Dutch: misdaad, French: crime, German: Verbrechen), the most serious category of crimes under Belgian law (comparable to major felonies) under some conditions. The council chamber can only decide on crimes when these are correctionalised. The process of correctionalisation requires the prosecutor to assume the existence of extenuating circumstances, and results in the crime being tried by the correctional section of a tribunal of first instance instead of a court of assizes. When a crime is not correctionalised and thus is to be tried by a court of assizes, the council chamber must send the case to the chamber of indictment, which will decide on the charges and deliver an indictment (Dutch: inbeschuldigingstelling, French: mise en accusation, German: Versetzung in den Anklagezustand) if sufficient indications of guilt exist. Only the chamber of indictment can deliver an indictment for a trial by a court of assizes.

=== Market Court ===
Since January 2017, the court of appeal of Brussels has a special section referred to as the Market Court (Dutch: Marktenhof, French: Cour des Marchés, German: Märktegerichtshof), which has exclusive jurisdiction over appeals against decisions made by regulators and administrative authorities regarding certain regulated markets. These cases are removed by law from the administrative jurisdiction of the Council of State, which generally has supreme jurisdiction over any administrative dispute. The Market Court hears cases in Dutch and French, and is chaired by a panel of three counsellors who are experienced in economic or financial law. More specifically, the Market Court hears appeals against certain decisions made by regulators regarding competition law, public takeover bids, counterfeit money, financial markets, energy markets, railway services, telecommunication services, postal services and data protection. The judgements made by the Market Court are final; no further appeal is possible against them (except for an appeal in cassation).

=== Specific procedures ===
The courts of appeal also have jurisdiction over certain procedures of a more administrative nature that are not strictly related to the administration of justice. These include:

- Certain requests of the public prosecutor's office to revoke the Belgian nationality of a person;
- Rehabilitation requests by bankruptees subjected to professional restrictions;
- Requests for homologation of decisions taken by a general meeting of shareholders or bondholders.

=== Crimes committed by high officials ===
==== Judicial and executive officers ====
In accordance with the Belgian Code of Criminal Procedure, the courts of appeal have original jurisdiction over certain judicial and executive officers suspected of having committed a delict or (correctionalised) crime, whether in or outside of the exercise of their office. This provision is referred to as privilege of jurisdiction (Dutch: voorrecht van rechtsmacht, French: privilège de juridiction, German: Gerichtsbarkeitsvorrecht). The judicial and executive officers to which privilege of jurisdiction applies, include all judges and counsellors in the courts and tribunals, all members of the public prosecutor's offices attached to the courts and tribunals, the members of the Court of Audit, the Constitutional Court, the Council of State and the Council for Alien Law Litigation, and the governors of the provinces of Belgium. In these exceptional criminal cases, the (suspected) offenders are tried directly by the court of appeal instead of the correctional section of the tribunal of first instance. The court of appeal will then judge the suspects in first and last instance; no further appeal is possible in these cases (except for an appeal in cassation). Whenever a counsellor in a court of appeal or member of its prosecutor-general's office is suspected of such a crime however, the Court of Cassation will transfer the case to a court or tribunal outside of the jurisdiction of the court of appeal involved. For non-correctionalised crimes, the court of appeal or Court of Cassation can only deliver an indictment for a trial by a court of assizes; it does not judge these cases itself. A criminal action brought against a judge, counsellor or member of a prosecutor's office is distinct from any disciplinary procedure regarding their judicial office, and that a criminal sentence does not necessarily lead to a removal from office.

==== Ministers ====
Special provisions regarding criminal liability apply to the ministers of the federal and regional governments as well. The fundamental principles of their criminal liability are laid down in articles 103 and 125 of the Belgian Constitution; these are further elaborated in the law of 25 June 1998 regulating the criminal liability of ministers and the special law of 25 June 1998 regulating the criminal liability of members of a community or regional government. The Constitution and both aforementioned laws establish that ministers can only be tried by a court of appeal with permission of the legislative assembly on which their government depends (for the federal government, this is the Chamber of Representatives). These provisions are intended to protect the separation of powers, given that the ministers are the leaders of the executive branch. According to these provisions, ministers can only be investigated, indicted or tried for any crime committed in the exercise of their office by the court of appeal which has jurisdiction over the place where the seat of their government is. For the federal and most regional governments, this is the court of appeal of Brussels, except for the Walloon government and the government of the German-speaking Community, for which this is the court of appeal of Liège. Crimes committed by ministers outside of their office that are being prosecuted during their tenure, can be tried or indicted by any court of appeal, according to the ordinary territorial rules. The prosecution of ministers in these exceptional cases can only be initiated by the prosecutor-general of the competent court of appeal. These cases are then heard by a panel of five or seven counsellors of the court of appeal. An appeal in cassation against the judgements of the courts of appeal in these cases is still possible.

==== Members of parliament ====
Lastly, members of any of the federal or regional legislative assemblies enjoy some immunity from prosecution as well. During the session of their legislative assembly, they too can only be prosecuted with the permission of said assembly, in order to protect the separation of powers. Whilst they are otherwise subject to the same rules of criminal jurisdiction as any ordinary person, article 59 of the Belgian Constitution establishes that coercive or intrusive investigatory measures (such as house searches) against a member of a federal or regional legislative assembly can only be ordered by the first president of a court of appeal, who needs to inform the president of the assembly involved of any such measure taken.

== Appeal in cassation ==
The judgements made by the courts of appeal are final as to questions of fact. Only an appeal in cassation on questions of law to the Court of Cassation, the supreme court in the judicial system of Belgium, is still possible. Such an appeal to the Court of Cassation is extraordinary procedure, and will result in the Court of Cassation either upholding or either quashing the contested judgement of the court of appeal. If the Court of Cassation does the latter, it will refer the case to a different court of appeal than were the case originated from, to be tried de novo (both on questions of fact and questions of law).

== Statistics ==
According to the statistics provided by the college of the courts and tribunals of Belgium, 15,118 appellate civil, commercial and family cases were opened at all courts of appeal in 2017, aside from 35,237 such cases that were still pending from before January 2017. In 17,356 of these cases, a judgement was rendered by the courts of appeal in 2017 and these cases were therefore closed. A total of 6,456 appellate criminal cases were opened at all courts of appeal as well, aside from 5,495 criminal cases that were still pending from before January 2017. In 6,028 of these criminal cases, a judgement was rendered in 2017 and these cases were therefore closed. Additionally, a total of 1,300 appellate (protectional) juvenile cases were opened in 2017, aside from 279 such cases that were still pending from before January 2017. In 1,275 of these juvenile cases, a judgement was rendered in 2017 and these cases were therefore closed. Lastly, a final decision was made by all chambers of indictment in 10,069 cases in 2017.

This brings the total number of court cases (those of the chambers of indictment excluded) opened at all courts of appeal in 2017 to 22,874, next to a number of 41,011 such cases in total that were still pending from before 2017, and 24,659 such cases in which a final judgement was reached in 2017.

Between January 2017 and January 2018, the Market Court in Brussels also decided on sixteen appeals against decisions of regulators, of which nine concerned the BIPT and five concerned the Belgian Competition Authority.

== List of courts of appeal ==
Map of the five judicial areas of Belgium (French names)

Judicial area of the court of appeal of Antwerp:

- Arrondissement of Antwerp
- Arrondissement of Limburg

Judicial area of the court of appeal of Brussels:

- Arrondissement of Brussels
- Arrondissement of Leuven
- Arrondissement of Walloon Brabant

Judicial area of the court of appeal of Ghent:

- Arrondissement of East Flanders
- Arrondissement of West Flanders

Judicial area of the court of appeal of Liège:

- Arrondissement of Eupen
- Arrondissement of Liège
- Arrondissement of Luxembourg
- Arrondissement of Namur

Judicial area of the court of appeal of Mons:

- Arrondissement of Hainaut

== Trivia ==
- Since 2009, the court of appeal of Antwerp can hear certain civil cases through videoconferencing, with the counsellors being present in Antwerp, and some or all of the claimants and defendants (and their lawyers) being present in a specially equipped courtroom in Hasselt. This way, people from Limburg involved in an appellate case no longer have to travel all the way to Antwerp, avoiding the long trip and the difficulties of traffic. For this project, the court of appeal of Antwerp and the bar associations of Hasselt and Tongeren received the Innovation award of 2010 from the Belgian High Council of Justice.

== See also ==
- Judiciary of Belgium
