= Justice of the peace (Belgium) =

Belgian court for minor civil claims

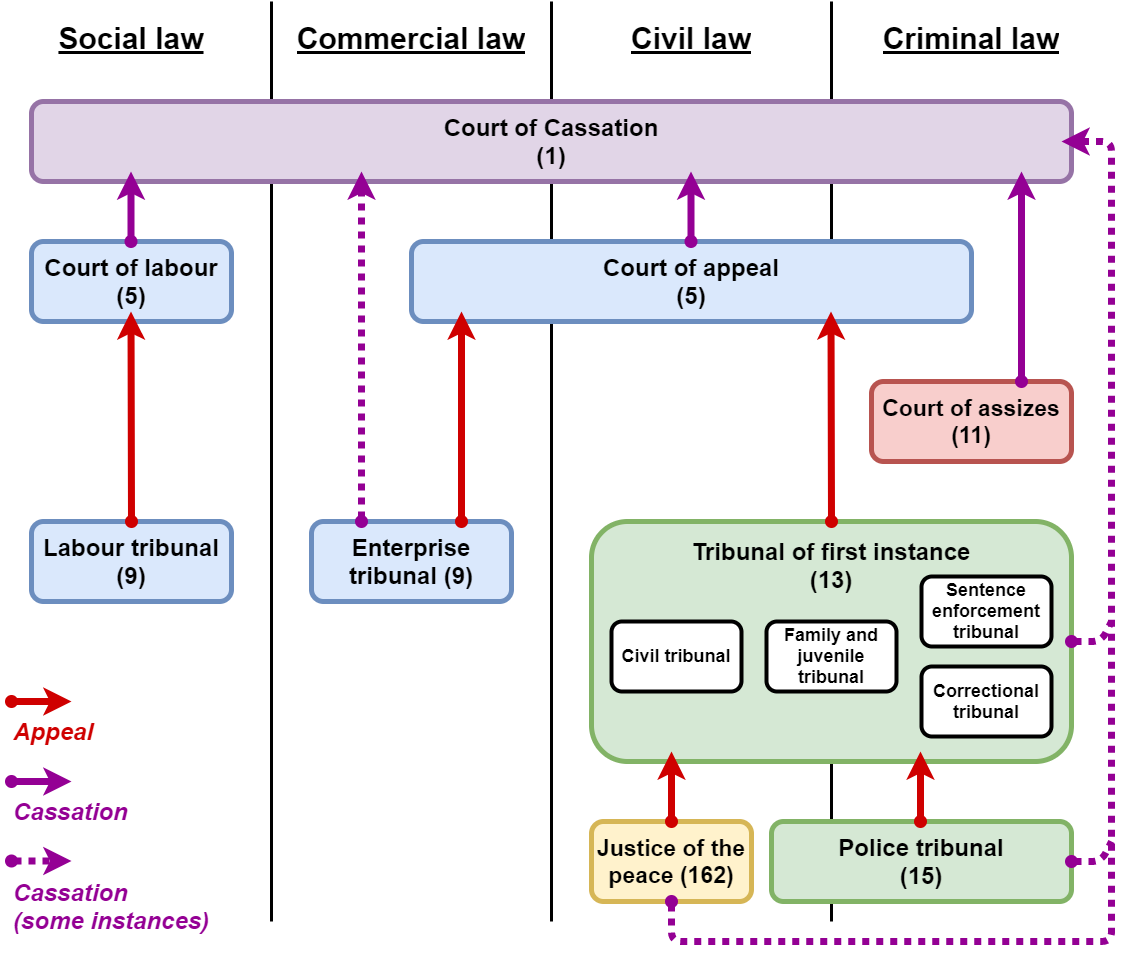
Belgian judicial hierarchy (2018).

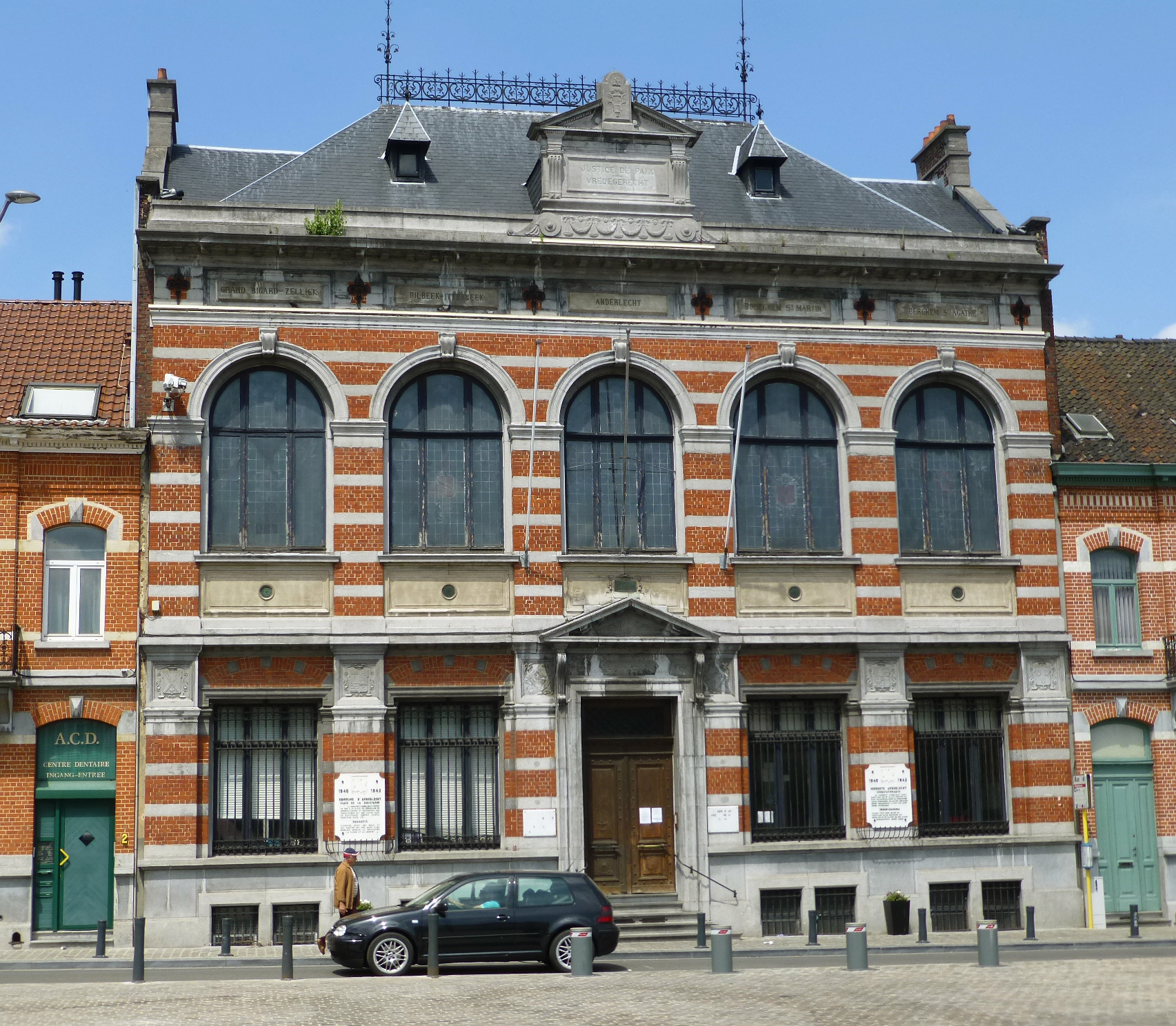
Current courthouse of the justice of the peace in Anderlecht, Belgium.

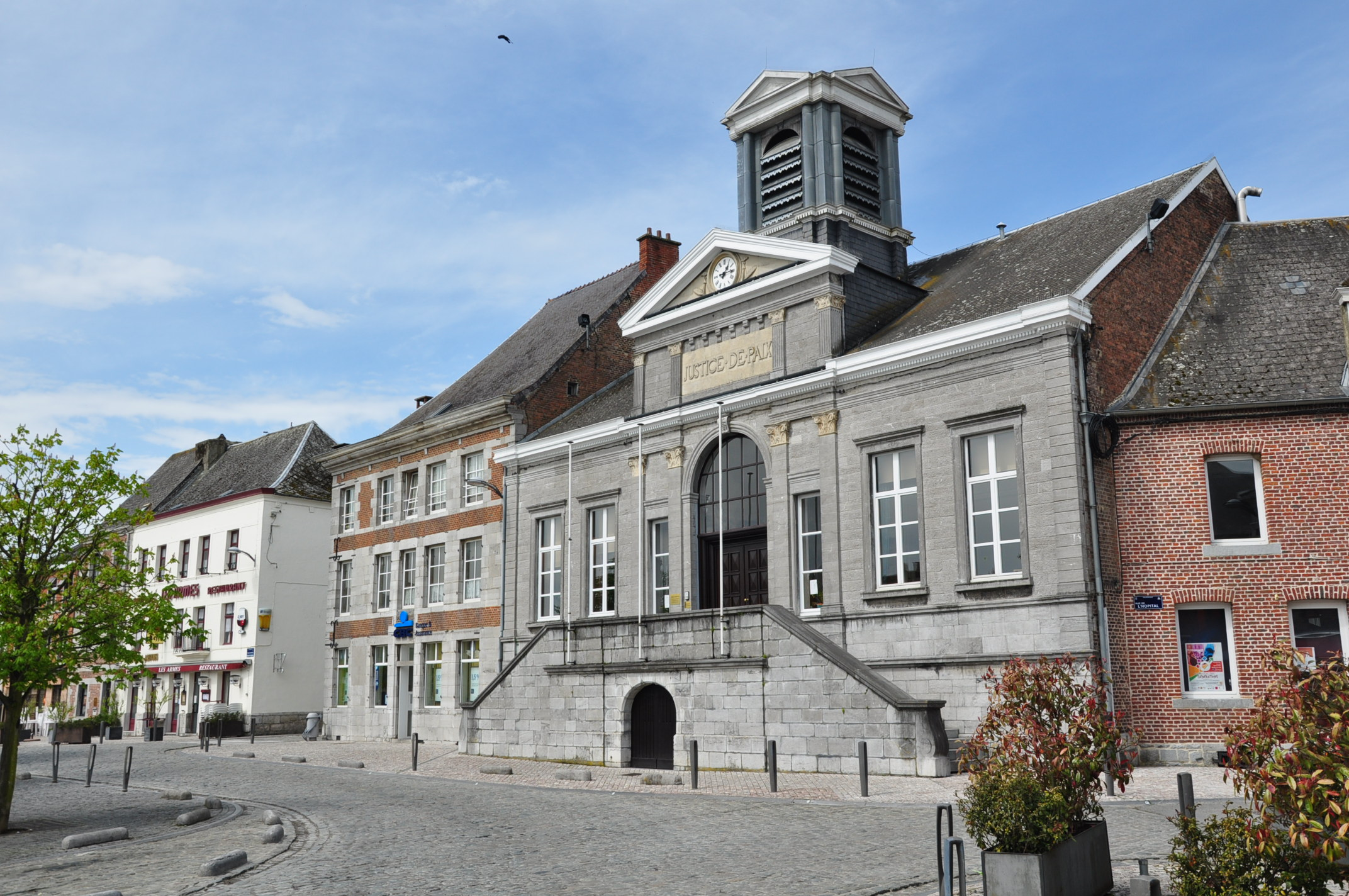
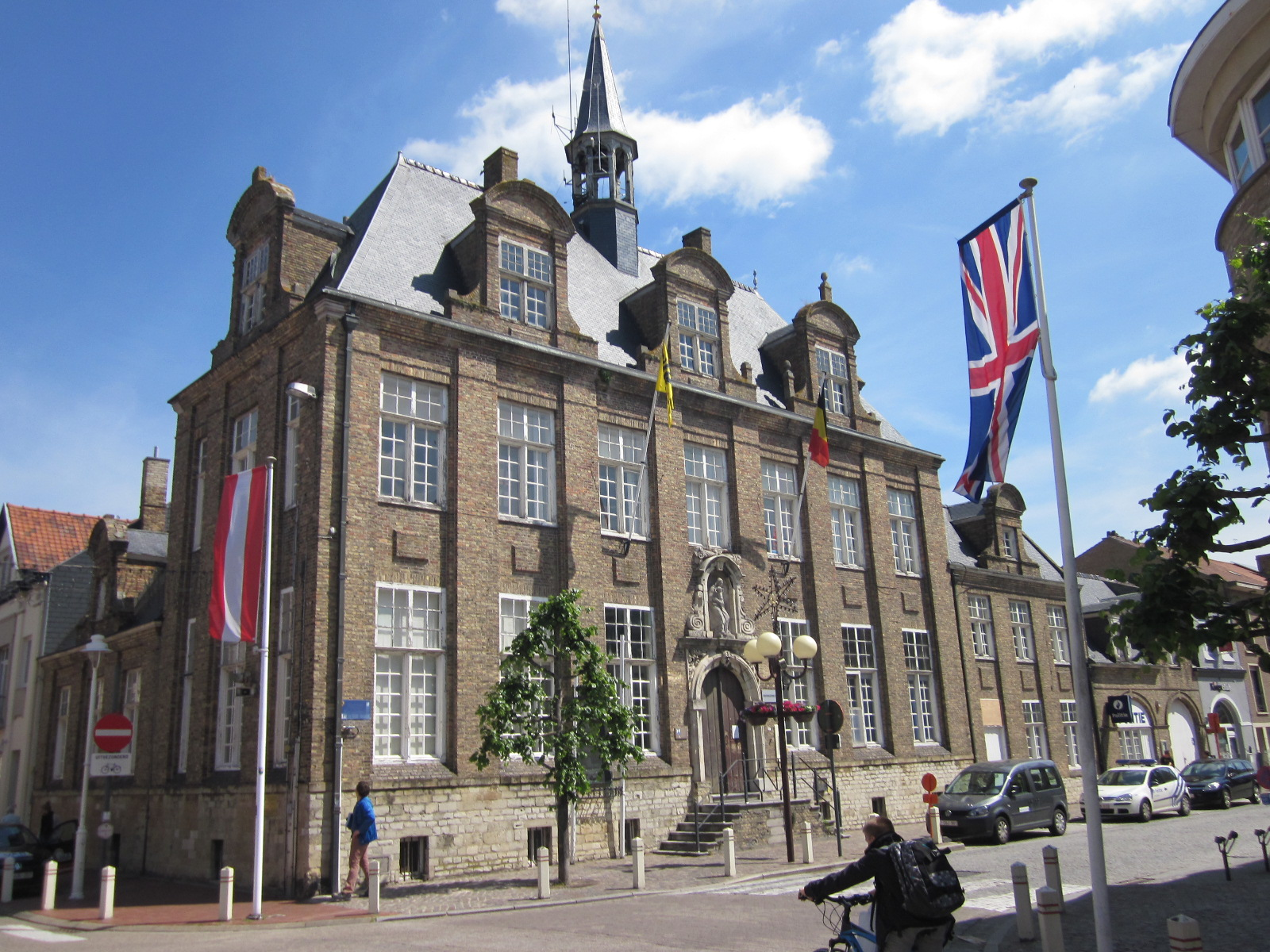
Former courthouses of the justices of the peace in Philippeville, Belgium and Nieuwpoort, Belgium.

The justice of the peace (Dutch: vredegerecht, French: justice de paix, German: Friedensgericht) is the small claims court in the judicial system of Belgium, and stands at the bottom of the Belgian judicial hierarchy. There is a justice of the peace for each judicial canton, which is the smallest geographical subdivision of Belgium for judicial purposes. Most judicial cantons cover multiple municipalities, except in the case of larger towns and cities, which are often divided into multiple judicial cantons. A judicial canton has an average population of 50,000 to 60,000 people, but some have a population as low as 30,000 people or as high as 100,000 people. The justices of the peace only have jurisdiction over their own canton. As of 2017, there are 187 cantons with as many justices of the peace in Belgium, who hear cases in 229 seats.

A judge of the peace (Dutch: vrederechter, French: juge de paix, German: Friedensrichter) chairs the justice of the peace. Judges of the peace are professional, law-trained magistrates who are, like all judges in Belgium, appointed for life until their retirement age. The judges of the peace hear cases as single judges, but are always assisted by a clerk. Because the justices of the peace hear only civil cases, there is (generally) no prosecutor present during their hearings. Both the claimant and the defendant in a case can be assisted or represented by counsel, but this is not required. Lawyers or notaries can act as locum tenens judge of the peace whenever the judge of the peace is absent. The organisation of the justices of the peace and their rules of civil procedure are laid down in the Belgian Judicial Code.

== Jurisdiction and procedures ==
=== Civil cases ===
They have original jurisdiction over civil cases in which the disputed amount does not exceed 5,000 euro (as of September 2018), except for the matters over which another court or tribunal has exclusive jurisdiction (disputes between companies for example, over which the enterprise tribunal has jurisdiction). In addition, the justices of the peace also have original jurisdiction over a number of matters irrespective of the disputed amount, such as cases involving the renting or leasing of real estate, evictions, easement, land consolidation, consumer credit or unpaid utility bills.

An important feature of the justices of the peace in these types of cases is the option of conciliation. This is a procedure free of charge in which the claimant and defendant appear voluntarily before the judge of the peace, who then tries to negotiate an amicable settlement between both parties. If the conciliation fails, the claimant may still choose to bring an actual lawsuit against the defendant to the justice of the peace, which will then deliver a binding judgement. A second notable point is that it is not uncommon for judges of the peace to visit places and properties involved in a case (for example, a plot of land of which the property line is disputed) together with the clerk, claimant and defendant, in order to gain a better understanding of the dispute.

=== Family cases ===
Aside from purely civil cases, the justices of the peace also have original jurisdiction in certain aspects of family law, most notably legal guardianships for incapacitated seniors, and the involuntary commitment of the mentally ill to psychiatric facilities.

=== Administrative duties ===
Lastly, in addition to the administration of justice, the judges of the peace also have certain duties of a more administrative nature, such as overseeing certain public auctions, swearing in certain officials like lock keepers and gaugers, and overseeing the vote counting in electoral cantons during an election.

== Appeal ==
Judgements made by the justices of the peace can be appealed to the civil or family sections of the tribunals of first instance, depending on the nature of the case. The judgements then delivered on these appeals by the tribunals of first instance are final; they cannot be further appealed to the courts of appeal. However, an appeal in cassation to the Court of Cassation on questions of law, not on questions of fact, is still possible on these final judgements.

The judgements made by the justices of the peace in petty cases where the disputed amount does not exceed 2,000 euro (as of September 2018) cannot be appealed (except for an appeal in cassation).

== Statistics ==
According to the statistics provided by the College of the courts and tribunals of Belgium, a total of 443,366 new cases were opened at all justices of the peace in 2015 (conciliation procedures excluded), next to a total of 432,350 cases that were closed at all justices of the peace in 2015 (including any cases opened before 2015). Aside from these cases, a total of 60,422 conciliation procedures were started at all justices of peace, of which 11,900 (or 19.7%) resulted in an amicable settlement being concluded. A total of 2,912 cases were transferred to a tribunal of first instance or the Court of Cassation in the context of a judgement of the justice of the peace being appealed.

== See also ==
- Judiciary of Belgium
