= Life imprisonment in Belgium =

Life imprisonment is legal in Belgium, and is the most severe punishment available under Belgian law since the abolition of the death penalty. Under Belgian law, it can only be imposed for the most serious of crimes, such as homicide, genocide, crimes against humanity, war crimes, or terrorism. Inmates sentenced to life imprisonment are eligible to apply for parole after serving 15 years (when they have no prior record, or a prior sentence below 3 years), 19 years (with a previous conviction below 5 years), or 23 years (with a previous conviction of 5 years or more). If the parole court rejects the parole request, the inmate may thereafter reapply every year until they are released or die.

Minors under age 12 are never prosecuted in Belgium. For those aged 12 to 17, the juvenile tribunal has jurisdiction. The most severe punishment available to a juvenile tribunal for a defendant aged 12-15 is 14 years of fixed-term imprisonment.

When the accused is 16 or 17 and suspected of severe offenses, a juvenile court may transfer the case to the correctional tribunal (or, in the most serious of cases, to the court of assizes). The most severe punishment that a court of assizes may pass against a defendant aged 16 or 17 is 30 years' imprisonment (with eligibility to apply for parole after 15 years).
