= Belgian Code of Criminal Procedure =

Code of law

French Parliament (1808–1815) Belgian Federal Parliament (1830–)
- Territorial extent: Belgium
- Enacted by: French Parliament
- Assented to: 1808

Summary
- This code governs the manner of conducting criminal investigations and prosecutions, as well as the jurisdiction and procedure of the criminal courts and tribunals of Belgium.
- Status: In force

The Belgian Code of Criminal Procedure (Dutch: Wetboek van Strafvordering, French: Code d'Instruction Criminelle, German: Strafprozessgesetzbuch) is a code of law in the country of Belgium, of which the different parts were formally adopted in November and December 1808 (before Belgium existed as a sovereign state). The code is currently still in force. The Code of Criminal Procedure governs the powers and duties of judicial police attributed to certain public and judicial officers, the manner in which to conduct criminal investigations and prosecutions, as well as the criminal jurisdiction of the courts and tribunals of the Belgian judiciary and the applicable rules of criminal procedure. As such, the Code of Criminal Procedure is one of the important codes of law in the Belgian legal system.

Matters such as the organization itself of the courts and tribunals however, are governed by the Belgian Judicial Code.

== History ==
The Code of Criminal Procedure was adopted when Belgium did not exist yet as a sovereign state; at the time it was still part of the First French Empire. The different parts of the code were passed by the French Parliament, and subsequently promulgated by Napoleon as the Emperor of the French at the end of 1808. The code was one of the five codes of law implemented by Napoleon.

The code remained in force when Belgium became part of the United Kingdom of the Netherlands in 1815, and when Belgium became a sovereign state after the Belgian Revolution of 1830–1831.

In 1878, a law was adopted containing the Preliminary title of the Code of Criminal Procedure. This title added a number of general provisions regarding criminal proceedings to the code.

The Code of Criminal Procedure has been amended many times since.

== Contents ==
=== Preliminary title: Actions that arise from offences ===
This preliminary title to the code (articles 1–32) contains general provisions regarding criminal prosecutions, civil actions related to crimes, statutes of limitations and the validity of evidence.

=== Book I: The judicial police and the officers who exercise it ===
This part of the code (articles 8–136quater) governs the powers and duties of police officers, prosecutors and investigative judges, and lays down the manner in which criminal investigations and pre-trial proceedings ought to be conducted.

=== Book II: The judiciary ===
This part of the code (articles 137–648) consists of eight titles.

==== Title I: Police tribunals and correctional tribunals ====
This part of the code (articles 137–216septies) lays down the criminal jurisdiction of the police tribunals, the correctional tribunals and the courts of appeal, the manner in which their criminal proceedings ought to be conducted, the applicable rules of evidence, as well as the means of recourse against their criminal judgments and rulings (including opposition, appeal and appeal in cassation). This part of the code also governs the granting of witness immunity, and certain out-of-court means of handling criminal cases such as plea bargains and criminal settlements.

==== Title II: The court of assizes ====
This part of the code (articles 216octies–363) lays down the criminal jurisdiction of the courts of assizes, the manner in which their criminal proceedings ought to be conducted, the applicable rules of evidence, as well as the means of recourse against their criminal judgments and rulings (including opposition and appeal in cassation).

==== Title IIbis: General provisions regarding the official acts and duties of the prosecutor-general's office ====
This part of the code (articles 364–406) governs certain duties of the prosecutor-general's offices at the courts of appeal.

==== Title III: Means of provision against rulings or judgments ====
This part of the code (articles 407–447bis) establishes the causes for nullity of criminal judgments and rulings, the manner in which cassation proceedings ought to be conducted, as well as the causes and procedures for reopening or retracting old cases.

==== Title IV: Some particular procedures ====
This part of the code (articles 448–524septies) establishes a number of procedures for specific cases (including amongst others: forgeries, criminal enforcement investigations, crimes committed by certain judicial or executive officers, ...).

==== Title V: Regulation of jurisdiction and referral from one tribunal to another ====
This part of the code (articles 525–552) governs the causes and procedures for settling jurisdictional conflicts, and for removing cases from one court or tribunal and referring them to another.

==== Title VI: Mediation ====
This part of the code (articles 553–588) governs the practice of both court-ordered as out-of-court mediation in criminal cases.

==== Title VII: Some matters of public interest and general security ====
This part of the code (articles 589–648) contains provisions regarding criminal records, prisons, procedures against false imprisonment, rehabilitation, and the expungement of criminal convictions.

== See also ==
- Belgium Penal Transaction Law
