= Eupen (disambiguation) =

Eupen can be:

- Eupen, municipality located in the Belgian province of Liège
- Lake Eupen, located near Eupen in Belgium
- Marit van Eupen, rower from the Netherlands
- Theodor van Eupen, SS-Sturmbannführer in charge of Treblinka I Arbeitslager during the Holocaust
- K.A.S. Eupen, Belgian football club
- Eupen-Malmedy, group of cantons in Belgium
- Judicial Arrondissement of Eupen, judicial arrondissement located in the Walloon Province of Liège, in Belgium.
