= Police court =

Police court may refer to:

- Police Court (film), a 1932 American film
- Police tribunal (France) (Tribunal de police), the lowest level of criminal court in France
- Police tribunal (Belgium) (Politierechtbank/Tribunal de police), the lowest level of criminal court in Belgium
- Magistrates' court (England and Wales), formerly known in larger towns as a police court, the lowest level of court in England and Wales
- The lowest level of court in many other common law jurisdictions
