= Tribunal of first instance (Belgium) =

Trial court in Belgium

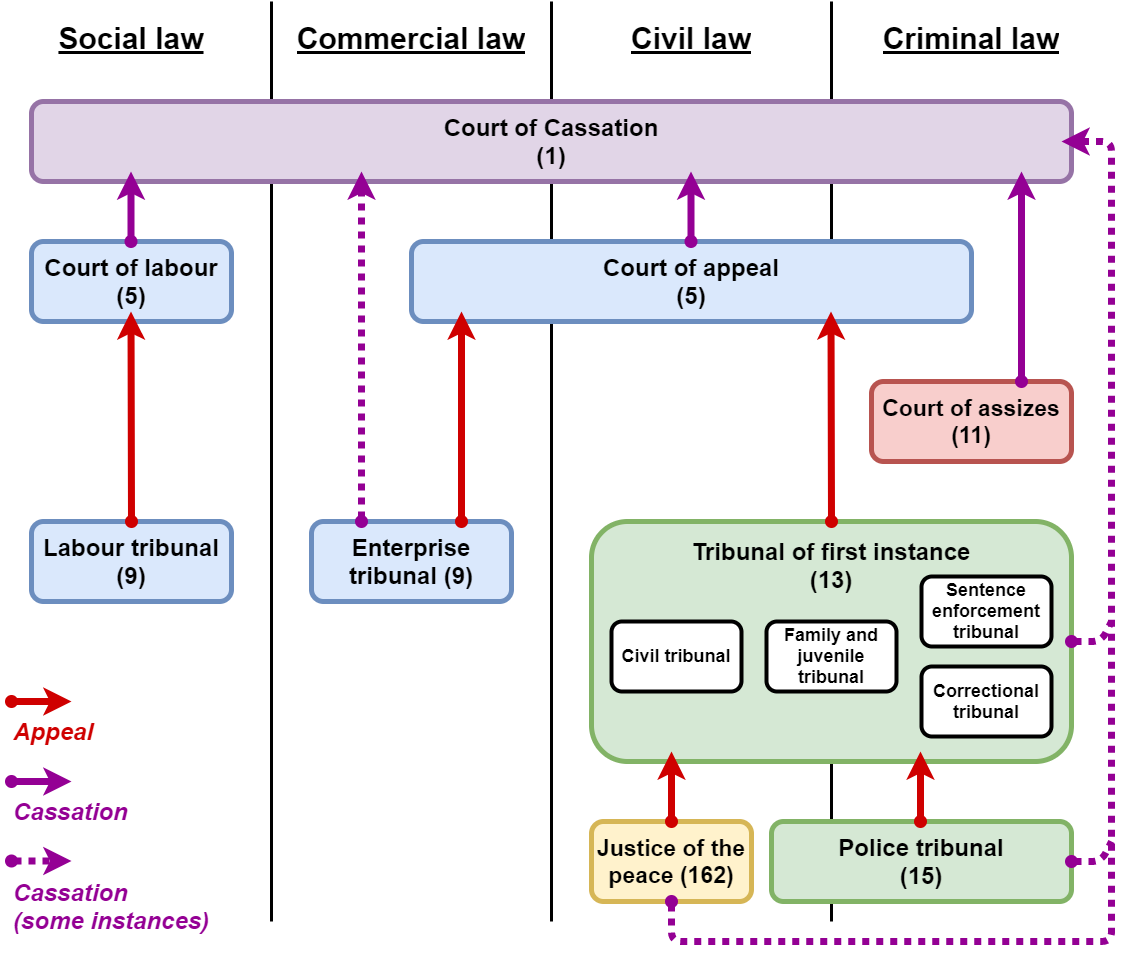
Belgian judicial hierarchy (2018)

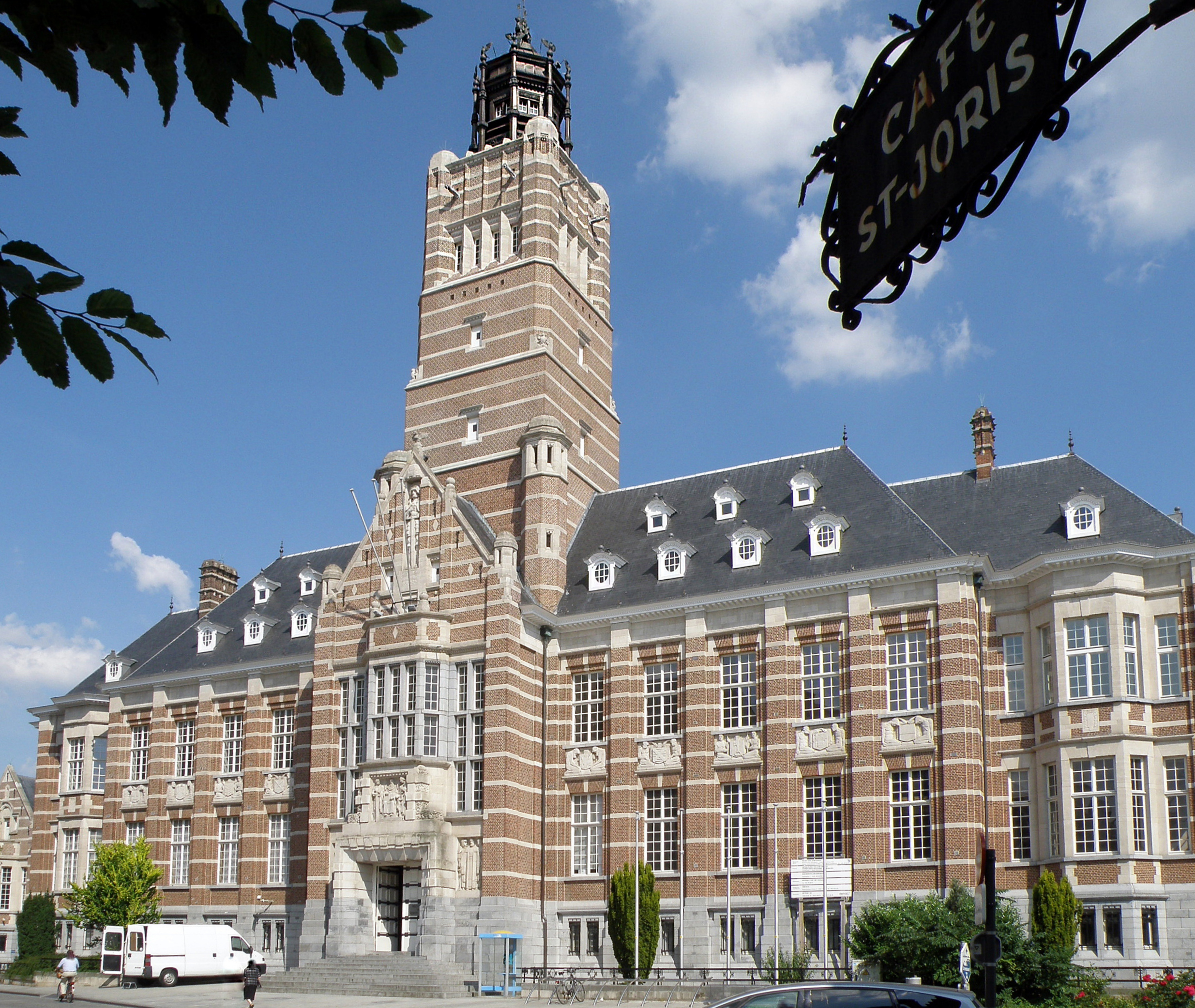
Court building of the tribunal of first instance of Dendermonde

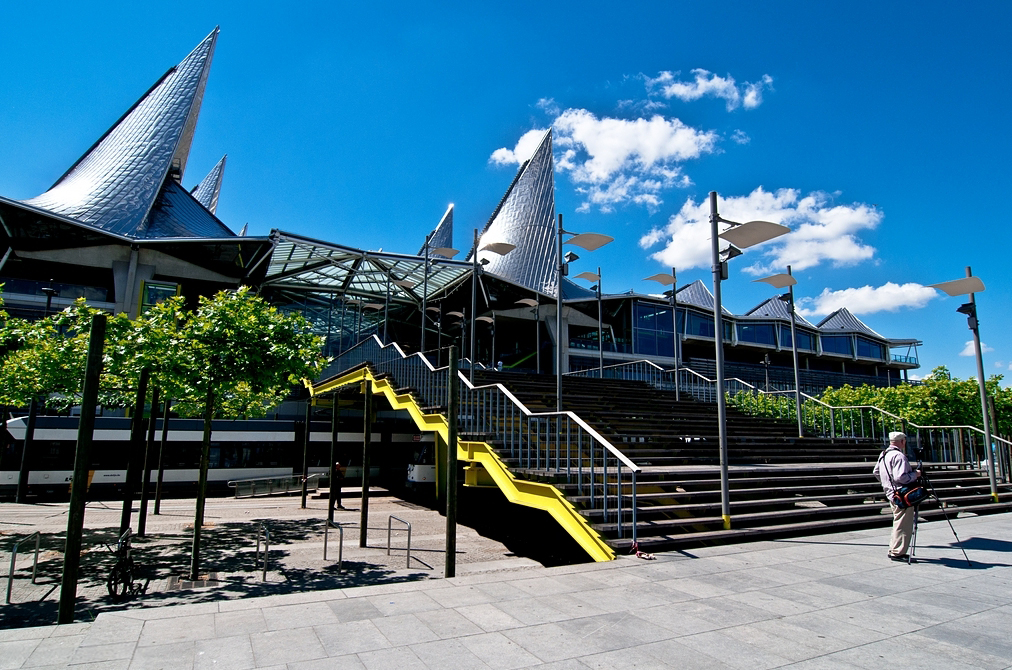
Palace of Justice in Antwerp, where (amongst others) the tribunal of first instance of the city is located

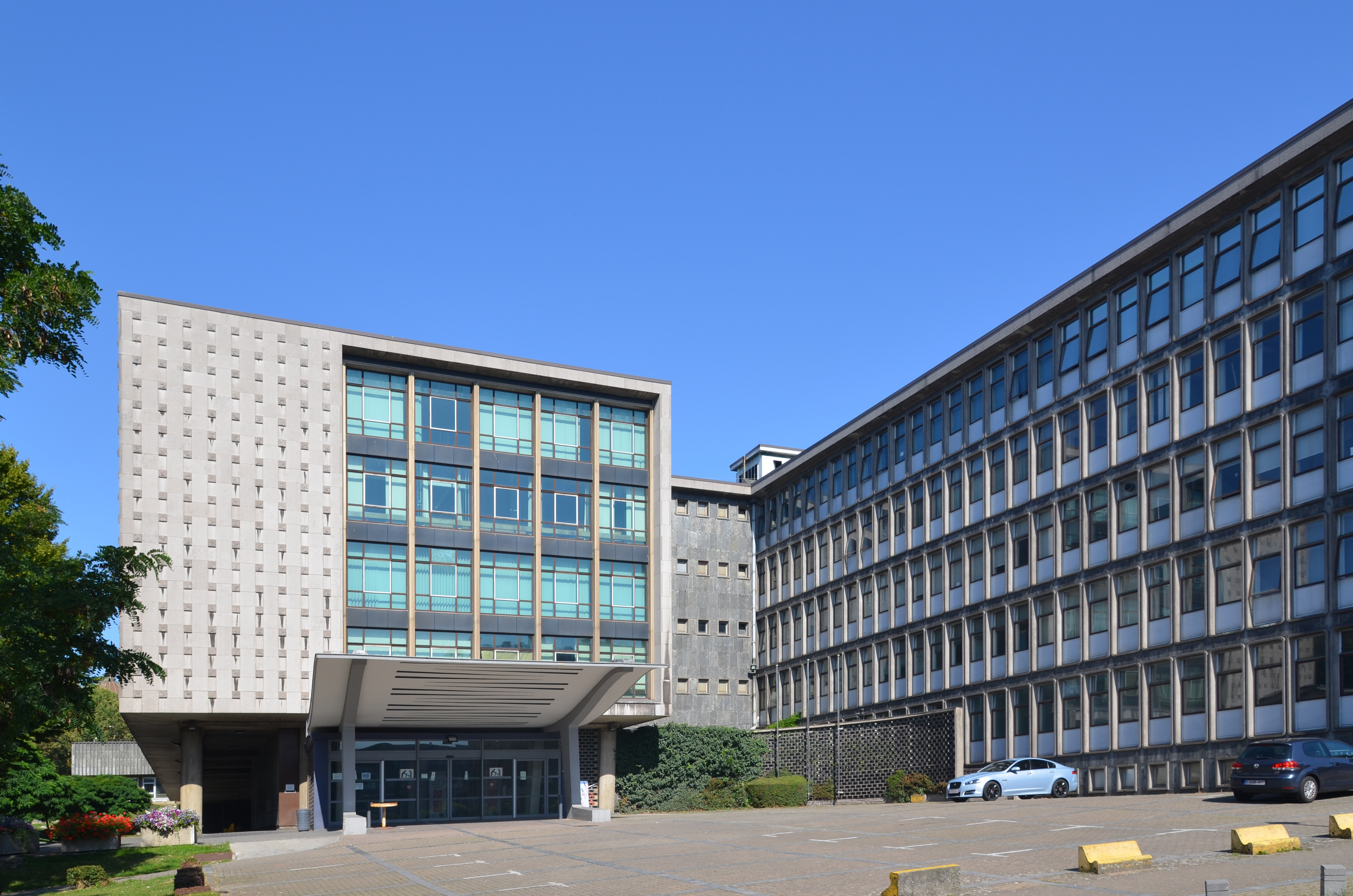
Palace of Justice in Charleroi, where (amongst others) this city's tribunal of first instance is located

The tribunals of first instance (Dutch: rechtbank van eerste aanleg, French: tribunal de première instance, German: Gericht erster Instanz) are the main trial courts in the judicial system of Belgium. The tribunals of first instance are courts of general jurisdiction; in the sense that they have original jurisdiction over all types of cases not explicitly attributed to other courts. They handle a wide range of civil cases, criminal cases, and cases under the scope of juvenile law and family law. They also hear appeals against the judgements of the police tribunals and justices of the peace. The judgements of the tribunals of first instance can be appealed to the courts of appeal in turn. There is a tribunal of first instance for each of the twelve judicial arrondissements ("districts") of Belgium, except for the arrondissement of Brussels. The arrondissement of Brussels has two tribunals of first instance, a Dutch-speaking one and a French-speaking one, due to the sensitive linguistical situation in the area. The territories of the current judicial arrondissements largely coincide with those of the provinces of Belgium. Most of the tribunals of first instance have multiple geographical divisions, with each having their own seat. As of 2020, the 13 tribunals of first instance have 27 seats in total (the two tribunals of Brussels share the same seat). Further below, an overview is provided of all seats of the tribunals of first instance per arrondissement.

Each tribunal of first instance is organised into a few sections which each hear different matters: a civil section which hears civil cases, a correctional section which hears criminal cases, a family section which hears family cases, and a juvenile section which hears juvenile cases. The seats of the tribunals of first instance where one of the five courts of appeal is jointly located, also have a sentence enforcement section, which hears cases related to the enforcement of criminal sentences and the treatment of the criminally insane. Even though they are all parts of a single tribunal of first instance, the aforementioned sections are often colloquially referred to as standalone courts. In this sense, taking into account that the family and juvenile sections are often grouped together, they are respectively named as:

- The civil tribunal (Dutch: burgerlijke rechtbank, French: tribunal civil, German: Zivilgericht);
- The correctional tribunal (Dutch: correctionele rechtbank, French: tribunal correctionnel, German: Korrektionalgericht);
- The family and juvenile tribunal (Dutch: familie- en jeugdrechtbank, French: tribunal de la famille et de la jeunesse, German: Familien- und Jugendgericht);
- The sentence enforcement tribunal (Dutch: strafuitvoeringsrechtbank, French: tribunal de l'application des peines, German: Strafvollstreckungsgericht).

The organisation of the tribunals of first instance, their jurisdiction, as well as the applicable rules of civil procedure and criminal procedure are laid down in the Belgian Judicial Code and Belgian Code of Criminal Procedure. The language in which the proceedings of the tribunals of first instance are held, depends on the official languages of their arrondissement: Dutch for the arrondissements of West Flanders, East Flanders, Antwerp, Limburg and Leuven, French for the arrondissements of Hainaut, Walloon Brabant, Namur, Liège and Luxembourg, and German for the arrondissement of Eupen. In the arrondissement of Brussels, the French-speaking tribunal holds its proceedings in French, whilst the Dutch-speaking tribunal holds its proceedings in Dutch. There are rules when and how cases can be transferred from one court to another for linguistic reasons, most notably for Brussels. This is because the use of languages in judicial matters is a sensitive topic in Belgium, and is strictly regulated by the law.

== Court structure ==
=== Geographical divisions ===
As stated above, most tribunals of first instance have multiple geographical divisions. This is because there used to be 27 judicial arrondissements prior to 2014, with each of those having their own tribunal of first instance. In 2014, the judicial system of Belgium was reformed and the arrondissements in most of the ten Belgian provinces were merged. This meant the territorial boundaries of the arrondissements would from then on mostly coincide with those of the provinces, and most of the formerly 28 independent tribunals of first instance would become divisions of 13 enlarged tribunals. The exceptions were Brussels, Leuven and Eupen, where no mergers with other arrondissements or courts took place for linguistic reasons. (The reform was especially contentious for the Brussels-Halle-Vilvoorde area.) The intention of the reform was to increase the flexibility of the judiciary, by allowing judges and prosecutors to be deployed in all divisions of the enlarged tribunals, and to increase the autonomy of the courts regarding their budget and management. Another feature of the enlargement was the possibility for the Belgian federal government to assign certain types of cases exclusively to one of the divisions of the merged tribunals, in order to promote specialisation of the judges. The matters that can be exclusively assigned to one of the divisions are for example international private law matters, or criminal cases which involve cybercrime or terrorism. For other matters than these, the divisions of each tribunal kept the same jurisdictional territory as from before the reform, being the territory of their pre-2014 arrondissement. None of the divisions of the enlarged tribunals have been dissolved since the reform.

=== Chambers and sections ===
For the purpose of hearing and adjudicating cases, the (divisions of the) tribunals of first instance are composed of a number of chambers. Each tribunal has predetermined rules to allocate each case to one of these chambers, based on the nature of the case, whilst taking into account the geographical rules as mentioned above. In this sense, civil matters are brought before one of the civil chambers, criminal matters are brought before one the correctional chambers, family matters are brought before one of the family chambers, juvenile matters are brought before one the juvenile chambers, and sentence enforcement matters are brought before one of the sentence enforcement chambers. The ensemble of these aforementioned chambers form respectively the civil section, the correctional section, the family and juvenile section, and the sentence enforcement section. It is the president of the tribunal who bears the responsibility of allocating each case to a chamber. The president may however deviate from the predetermined allocation rules whenever the need arises.

=== Judges ===
==== Status ====
The judges in the tribunals of first instance are officially titled 'judge' (Dutch: rechter, French: juge, German: Richter). They are primarily appointed to one specific tribunal and have life tenure, notwithstanding their retirement when they reach the statutory retirement age of 67. Judges primarily appointed to one tribunal are also appointed, in a secondary capacity, to all other tribunals of first instance that fall under the same court of appeal. Under some circumstances, they can be transferred to one of these other tribunals of first instance (to address shortages for example). They cannot removed from their offices except in select circumstances (such as in case of disciplinary actions). Decisions regarding removal from office can also only be made by certain judicial bodies; there is no dismissal procedure through the legislative or executive branches of power. The chambers of the tribunal of first instance are presided over by either a single judge, or either a panel of three judges. In the latter case, one of the three acts as the presiding judge, and the other two as assessor judges. The president of the tribunal determines which judges sit in which chambers. Normally, newly appointed judges only sit in chambers with three judges for a year before they can hear cases as a single judge.

==== Appointment procedure ====
In order to be appointed as judge to a tribunal of first instance, potential candidates must meet certain statutory requirements: they must hold the Belgian nationality, must hold a law degree, must have a clean criminal record (minor violations excluded), and must meet the language requirements. Potential candidates meeting these minimum requirements can become a candidate in three ways:

- Potential candidates who have at least two years of legal experience, can take part in an entrance examination. Those who pass this examination can be admitted for a two-year judicial internship, which includes specific judicial training and internships at a public prosecutor's office and a court, amongst other things. Judicial interns become candidates when they are favourably evaluated at the end of their internship. This route is primarily aimed at young legal professionals.
- Potential candidates who have at least four years of legal experience, can take part in an examination (with an oral and written part) to demonstrate their professional competence. Participants who pass this examination obtain a certificate, which is on itself not sufficient to be a candidate however. Potential candidates must, aside from this certificate, also have a more extensive minimum experience in a legal profession (five, ten, or twelve years, depending on the specific type of profession), in order to be a candidate. This route is primarily aimed at more experienced legal professionals.
- Potential candidates who have at least twenty years of legal experience, of which at least fifteen years as bar attorney, can take part in a more limited examination (only oral) to demonstrate their professional competence. Participants who pass this examination, obtain a certificate with which they can be a candidate. This route is primarily aimed at experienced bar attorneys. The amount of judgeships that can be filled via this third route is limited by the law however.

The above examinations are administered by the High Council of Justice of Belgium; judicial training and support for judicial interns is provided by the Institute of Judicial Training of Belgium. The above three avenues only make one a candidate to be appointed as judge however. Once a vacancy arises, candidates can apply to be appointed. An opinion on each candidate will be provided to the federal minister of Justice of Belgium by at least the president of the tribunal to which the candidate would be appointed and the relevant bar association. The minister of Justice will then send all candidacies to the High Council of Justice, which will nominate one candidate. The Belgian federal government (officially "the King" as the personification of the executive) will then finally appoint or reject the nominated candidate. The appointment becomes official once the candidate takes the oath of office prescribed by the law. The oath is taken before the court of appeal under which the tribunal falls. The judges who were appointed through any of the other means than after a judicial internship, must follow additional judicial training at the Institute of Judicial Training after their appointment. Following additional training is also required before a judge can exercise some specific judicial functions in the tribunal of first instance, such as those of investigative judge or juvenile judge.

==== Alternate judges ====
Aside from the aforementioned permanent judges, there are also "alternate judges" (Dutch: plaatsvervangend rechter, French: juge suppléant, German: stellvertretender Richter) appointed to each tribunal of first instance. Alternate judges do not have a permanent position in the tribunal, but are only called upon when a permanent judge is absent or to address temporary shortages or backlogs. Most alternate judges have a main occupation as bar attorney, notary or legal scholar. Potential candidates for a position as alternate judge must meet the same statutory minimum requirements as potential candidates for a position as permanent judge, and must have at least five years of legal experience. To become a candidate alternate judge, one can follow any of the three routes that also make one a candidate permanent judge, or choose a fourth route. This fourth option is a specific examination accessible to all persons with a law degree, which is organised by the High Council of Justice. Those who pass this examination, obtain a certificate with which they can be a candidate alternate judge. Candidates are appointed as alternate judge according to the same appointment procedure as permanent judges. Those who have been alternate judge for a certain amount of time, can become a candidate for a position as permanent judge under certain adapted conditions.

Retired judges can also be appointed as alternate judge for a certain period of time after their retirement.

==== Lay judges ====
The chambers of the sentence enforcement section are normally presided over by a panel of three judges: one of the "ordinary" judges of the tribunal and two lay judges. The ordinary judge acts as the presiding judge, the two lay judges as assessor judges. The official title of these lay judges is "assessor in the sentence enforcement tribunal" (Dutch: assessor in de strafuitvoeringsrechtbank, French: assesseur au tribunal de l'application des peines, German: Beisitzer am Strafvollstreckungsgericht). There are three categories of these lay judges: specialists in penitentiary matters, specialists in social reintegration, and specialists in clinical psychology. In the chambers that handle cases related to the enforcement of criminal sentences, one of the lay judges is a specialist in penitentiary matters and the other one a specialist in social reintegration. In the chambers that handle cases related to the committal and treatment of the criminally insane, one of the lay judges is a specialist in social reintegration and the other one a specialist in clinical psychology. Just like is the case for the ordinary judges, there are permanent and alternate lay judges. To become a lay judge, one must meet certain statutory requirements, possess the necessary qualifications, and pass an examination organised by the Belgian federal government. The federal government will appoint the lay judges from among those who passed this examination. Unlike the ordinary judges, the lay judges do not have life tenure, but are appointed for a limited duration. Their appointment can be renewed, subject to a favourable evaluation by the president of the tribunal of first instance. These specialist lay judges only serve on the sentence enforcement chambers; they cannot sit in any of the other sections or chambers of the tribunal.

=== Court leadership and management ===
Each tribunal of first instance is headed by the president of the tribunal (Dutch: voorzitter van de rechtbank, French: président du tribunal, German: Gerichtspräsident). The president is charged with the overall leadership of the tribunal: (s)he is responsible for allocating all cases to a chamber of the tribunal and for determining which judges sit in which chambers, amongst other things. The president of the tribunal is complemented by a division president (Dutch: afdelingsvoorzitter, French: président de division, German: Abteilungspräsident) in each of the tribunal's geographical divisions. In most tribunals of first instance, there are also one or more vice presidents (Dutch: ondervoorzitter, French: vice-président, German: Vizepräsident) to assist the president in his or her duties. To be appointed to one of these aforementioned positions, candidates must meet certain statutory requirements. The president is appointed in a manner similar to the appointment as judge: the High Council of Justice will receive all candidacies and relevant opinions, will nominate one candidate, and the Belgian federal government will appoint or reject the nominated candidate. The presidents are only appointed for a term of five years, which can be renewed once. The candidates for the positions of division president and vice president are nominated by the president from amongst the judges of the tribunal of first instance, and appointed or rejected by the tribunal's general assembly. The division presidents and vice presidents are only appointed for a term of three years, which can be renewed.

== Divisions ==
=== Civil Court ===
The Civil Court consists of the civil chambers of the Court of First Instance. Each civil chamber consist of one or of three judges. The Civil Court deals in first instance with civil cases that exceed the competences of the justice of the peace, but it also hears appeals against decisions of justices of the peace in civil cases if the amount involved exceeds 1,240 euro. If the amount involved doesn't exceed this amount, no appeal against the decision of the justice of the peace is possible. The Civil Court also deals with divorces, cases regarding lineage, disputes regarding the execution of court decisions and rulings, the right of reply and tax returns. In addition, the Civil Court has jurisdiction over cases not explicitly assigned to another court. The Civil Court also has appellate jurisdiction with regard to decisions of the police tribunal regarding compensation claims arising from traffic accidents.

Decisions of the Civil Court, with the exception of decisions regarding appeals against decisions of the justice of the peace or the police tribunal, can be appealed against to the civil chambers of the Court of Appeal. Decisions of the Civil Court regarding appeals against decisions of the justice of the peace of the police tribunal can only be appealed against on points of law to the Court of Cassation.

=== Correctional Court ===
The Correctional Court consists of the correctional chambers of the Court of First Instance. Each correctional chamber consists of one or of three judges. The Correctional Court deals with misdemeanors and has appellate jurisdiction over decisions of the police tribunal. It also deals with correctionalised felonies. Felonies are normally dealt with by the Court of Assize, but the Chamber of Indictment can take into account mitigating circumstances and "correctionalise" the felony, i.e. refer the case to the Correctional Court instead.

The Correctional Court doesn't have jurisdiction with regard to offences related to traffic, which fall under the jurisdiction of the police tribunal. It doesn't have jurisdiction with regard to political crimes and press-related crimes either as those crimes fall under the jurisdiction of the Court of Assize, with the exception of press-related crimes that were inspired by racism or xenophobia. The latter do fall under its jurisdiction.

Decisions of the Correctional Court can be appealed against to the correctional chambers of the Court of Appeal, except in the case of appeals against decisions of the police tribunal heard by the Correctional Court. Decisions of the Correctional Court regarding appeals against decisions of the police tribunal can only be appealed against on points of law to the Court of Cassation.

=== Juvenile Court ===
The Juvenile Court has jurisdiction over most civil and criminal cases involving minors.

== List of tribunals of first instance ==
Map of the judicial arrondissements of Belgium (French names).

As of 2020, there is a seat of a tribunal of first instance in the following municipalities (per judicial arrondissement):

Arrondissement of West Flanders:

- Bruges
- Kortrijk
- Veurne
- Ypres

Arrondissement of East Flanders:

- Dendermonde
- Ghent
- Oudenaarde

Arrondissement of Antwerp:

- Antwerp
- Mechelen
- Turnhout

Arrondissement of Brussels:

- Brussels (Dutch-speaking)*
- Brussels (French-speaking)*

Arrondissement of Leuven:

- Leuven

Arrondissement of Limburg:

- Hasselt
- Tongeren

Arrondissement of Hainaut:

- Charleroi
- Mons
- Tournai

Arrondissement of Walloon Brabant:

- Nivelles

Arrondissement of Namur:

- Dinant
- Namur

Arrondissement of Luxembourg:

- Arlon
- Marche-en-Famenne
- Neufchâteau

Arrondissement of Liège:

- Huy
- Liège
- Verviers

Arrondissement of Eupen:

- Eupen

(*): Due to the sensitive linguistic situation in and around Brussels, there are two independent tribunals of first instance in the arrondissement of Brussels.

== See also ==
- Judiciary of Belgium
