= Commercial Tribunal (Belgium) =

The Business Court (Dutch: Ondernemingsrechtbank, French: Tribunal de l’entreprise, German: Unternehmensgericht) in Belgium is a court which deals with commercial litigation that exceeds the competence of the Justice of the Peace and hears appeals against the decisions of the Justice of the Peace in commercial cases. It is not a division of the Court of First Instance because commercial law is not a branch of civil law in Belgium. There is a Commercial Court in each judicial arrondissement of Belgium.

Before 1 November 2018, the court was named the Commercial Court (Dutch: Rechtbank van koophandel, French: Tribunal de commerce and German: Handelsgericht).
