= Court auction =

Court auction is an auction which takes place at a public location designated by the court.

If a property owner fails to pay the mortgage, the mortgage holder can foreclose on that property. If the owner is unable to make sufficient payments, the property can be sold at auction. The time and place of the auction is published in official records.

In case the value of the debt being foreclosed on is substantially less than the market value of the real property, this can finish the trouble for the debitor by paying all the credits.

== Germany ==
In Germany the court may suspend the auction for 6 months on the debtor's justified request. Justification may be hardship, e.g. if debtor has a physical disability and cannot find adequate housing. The creditor can object up to twice if the result of the auction is not sufficient to fulfil the claim. The bidder must deposit security in the amount of 10%. The highest bidder becomes the owner of the real property. If the claim is greater than the market value of the real property, debts are handled in an insolvency proceeding.

== Spain ==
Spanish mortgage holders are responsible for the full amount of the loan to the bank in addition to penalty interest charges, and court fees. A bidder must pay 5% of the valuation price to participate.

== United States ==
Historically, the vast majority of judicial foreclosures have been unopposed, since most defaulting borrowers have no money with which to hire counsel. The highest bidder at the auction becomes the owner of the real property, free and clear of interest of the former owner. In 2009 there was a growing consensus that the deepening collapse of the housing market was at the heart of the country's acute economic downturn. The rules for court auction differ in the states. Usually the auction takes place at the property location and online in other instances. In US auctions are free to participate without a broker.

== See also ==
- Public auction
- Compulsory purchase in England and Wales
