= Judicial panel =

Group of judges making judgments by vote

A judicial panel is a set of judges who sit together to hear a cause of action, most frequently an appeal from a ruling of a trial court judge. Panels are used in contrast to single-judge appeals, and en banc hearings, which involves all of the judges of that court. Most national supreme courts sit as panels. In addition, in many countries of the civil law tradition, trial courts are also constituted as judicial panels. Panels may vary in size depending on the jurisdiction and the importance or complexity of the case, with the general assumption that the larger the panel, the greater the authority and precedential weight of its decision.

== United States ==
=== Appellate cases ===
In the United States, most state and federal appellate cases are heard by three-judge panels. The governing statute for federal appellate courts, 28 U.S.C. § 46(c), provides:

Cases and controversies shall be heard and determined by a court or panel of not more than three judges (except that the United States Court of Appeals for the Federal Circuit may sit in panels of more than three judges if its rules so provide), unless a hearing or rehearing before the court en banc is ordered by a majority of the circuit judges of the circuit who are in regular active service.

This practice has been in place since as early as 1891.

=== In district courts ===
Most trials in the United States district courts are held before a single judge, but there are some circumstances where the trial itself is required to be held before a three-judge panel. For example, 28 U. S. C. § 2284(a) states:

A district court of three judges shall be convened when otherwise required by Act of Congress, or when an action is filed challenging the constitutionality of the apportionment of congressional districts or the apportionment of any statewide legislative body.

Until 1976, three-judge panels heard lawsuits challenging the constitutionality of state and federal statutes, but this practice has largely ended, the major exceptions being apportionment and redistricting cases.

The Prison Litigation Reform Act requires that any "prisoner release orders" requiring the reduction of prisoner population be issued by a panel of three district judges. This occurred for example in Brown v. Plata.

Typically, if the chief judge is a member of the panel, that person will chair the panel and call hearings to order; if the chief judge is not on the panel, this duty falls to the senior-most judge. Following oral arguments, the judges will meet briefly to confer and determine what the likely majority opinion in the case will be. If the judge who chairs the panel is in the majority at this time, that judge may assign the writing of the opinion for that case.

=== Panel selection ===
Selection of judicial panels is supposed to be random, or otherwise carried out in a way that avoids an appearance that the selection of the panel is intended to influence the outcome of a case. In the United States federal courts, the office of the courts states that "creation and scheduling of panels, and the assignment of specific cases to those panels, is handled by either the clerk of court's office or the circuit executive's office", with judges having "no role in panel assignments". In some cases, challenges have been raised against the randomness or neutrality of the selection process. In 1963, judge Benjamin Franklin Cameron of the United States Court of Appeals for the Fifth Circuit "threw [the court] into turmoil, charging Chief Judge Elbert P. Tuttle with manipulating the composition of panels in civil rights and desegregation cases so as to influence their outcome". Although on the surface it appears that certain judges appeared on the panels an unusual number of times, a deeper examination noted that some of these appearances were dictated by the preference of certain judges (including Cameron) not to sit with others, thus reducing the number of possible combinations, and counting multiple hearings of the same case as separate panels. A 2015 study suggested that "several of the circuit courts have panels that are nonrandom in ways that impact the ideological balance of panels".

== See also ==
- Judicial opinion
