= Judicial Arrondissement of Eupen =

Judicial district of Liege, Belgium

Coordinates: 50°37′40″N 6°2′10″E

Judicial Arrondissement of Eupen Arrondissement judiciaire d'Eupen
- Judicial Arrondissement
- Location of the judicial arrondissement in Liège
- Country: Belgium
- Region: Wallonia
- Province: Liège

Population (2016)
  - Total: 19,321

The Judicial Arrondissement of Eupen (German: Gerichtsbezirk Eupen; French: Arrondissement judiciaire d'Eupen; Dutch: Gerechtelijk arrondissement Eupen) is a judicial arrondissement located in the Walloon Province of Liège, in Belgium. It comprises the 9 municipalities of the German-speaking Community. It is not an administrative arrondissement. As of 2016, there are 19,321 under its jurisdiction.

== Subdivisions ==
Judicial Arrondissement of Eupen is divided into two judicial arrondissements. It includes the 9 German-speaking municipalities of the Arrondissement of Verviers.
