= Question of law =

Subject of court cases

In law, a question of law, also known as a point of law, is a question that must be answered by a judge and cannot be answered by a jury. Such a question is distinct from a question of fact, which must be answered by reference to facts and evidence as well as inferences arising from those facts. Answers to questions of law are generally expressed in terms of broad legal principles. They can be applied to many situations rather than particular circumstances or facts. An answer to a question of law as applied to the specific facts of a case is often referred to as a conclusion of law.

In several civil law jurisdictions, the highest courts deem questions of fact as settled by the lower courts and will only consider questions of law. They thus may refer a case back to a lower court to re-apply the law and answer any fact-based evaluations based on their answer on the application of the law. International courts such as the Benelux Court of Justice and the European Court of Justice will only answer questions of law asked by judges of national courts if they are uncertain about the interpretation of the law of multilateral organizations.

Questions of law are resolved by a judge or equivalent, while questions of fact are resolved by a trier of fact, which in the common law system is often a jury. Conclusions of law are more readily reconsidered by an appellate court, whereas findings of fact in a common law legal system are rarely overturned.

== Question of fact ==
In law, a question of fact, also known as a point of fact, is a question that must be answered by reference to facts and evidence as well as inferences arising from those facts. Such a question is distinct from a question of law, which must be answered by applying relevant legal principles. The answer to a question of fact (a "finding of fact") usually depends on particular circumstances or factual situations.

All questions of fact can be proved or disproved by reference to a certain standard of evidence. Depending on the nature of the matter, the standard of proof may require that a fact be proven to be "more likely than not" (there is barely more evidence for the fact than against, as established by a preponderance of the evidence) or true beyond reasonable doubt.

Answers to questions of fact are determined by a trier of fact such as a jury or a judge. In many jurisdictions, such as England and Wales, appellate courts generally do not consider appeals based on errors of fact (errors in answering a question of fact). Instead, the findings of fact of the first venue are usually given great deference by appellate courts.

The philosopher Alfred Lessing argues that the difference between questions of law and questions of fact is ill-defined, with frequent disagreement over whether a given statement was the former or the latter.

The distinction between "law" and "fact" has proved obscure wherever it is employed. For instance, the common law used to require that a plaintiff's complaint in a civil action only state the "facts" of his case, not any "legal conclusions." Unfortunately, no one has ever been able to tell whether the allegation that "on November 9, the defendant negligently ran over the plaintiff with his car at the intersection of State Street and Chestnut Street" is a statement of fact or a legal conclusion. In fact, the distinction between law and fact is just the legal version of the philosophical distinction between "empirical" and "analytical" statements, a distinction on whose existence philosophers have been unable to agree to this day. [...] we will see that many defendants charged with impossible attempts are not in fact attempting the crime they are charged with attempting. They merely think they are committing a crime. ...

Justice Felix Frankfurter wrote in Brown v. Allen that findings of fact were based on "recital[s] of external events and the credibility of their narrators".

== See also ==
- A priori and a posteriori
- Analytic–synthetic distinction
- Case brief
- Demarcation problem
- Epistemology
- Fact § In law
- Fact–value distinction
- Falsifiability
- Findings of facts
- Is–ought problem
- Judgment (law)
- Lord Advocate's Reference
- Problem of induction
- Test (law)
