= Examining magistrate =

Judge on pre-trial investigations

An examining magistrate is a judge in an inquisitorial system of law who carries out pre-trial investigations into allegations of crime and in some cases makes a recommendation for prosecution. Also known as an investigating magistrate, inquisitorial magistrate, or investigating judge, the exact role and standing of examining magistrates varies by jurisdiction. Common duties and powers of the examining magistrate include overseeing ongoing criminal investigations, issuing search warrants, authorizing wiretaps, making decisions on pretrial detention, interrogating the accused person, questioning witnesses, examining evidence, as well as compiling a dossier of evidence in preparation for trial.

Investigating judges in France have an important role in the French judiciary. They are also a feature of the Spanish, Dutch, Belgian and Greek criminal justice systems, although the extent of the examining magistrate's role has generally diminished over time. Since the late 20th and early 21st centuries, several countries, including Switzerland, Germany, Portugal, and Italy, have abolished the position of examining magistrate outright. In some cases, they have created new positions that take on some of these responsibilities.

== Role and description ==
John Henry Merryman and Rogelio Pérez-Perdomo have described the examining magistrate's role in civil-law systems as follows:

The typical criminal proceeding in the civil law world can be thought of as divided into three basic parts: the investigative phase, the examining phase (the instruction), and the trial. The investigative phase comes under the direction of the public prosecutor, who also participates actively in the examining phase, which is supervised by the examining judge. The examining phase is primarily written and is not public. The examining judge controls the nature and scope of this phase of the proceeding. The examining judge is expected to investigate the matter thoroughly and to prepare a complete written record so that by the time the examining stage is complete, all the relevant evidence is in the record. If the examining judge concludes that a crime was committed and that the accused is the perpetrator, the case then goes to trial. If the judge decides that no crime was committed or that the crime was not committed by the accused, the matter does not go to trial.

== Comparison to common-law systems ==
The role of the examining magistrate is important in civil-law jurisdictions such as France, which have an inquisitorial system. In contrast, common-law jurisdictions such as England and the United States have an adversarial system and lack a comparable official. Frequent close interaction with police and prosecutors "may well condition examining magistrates to favor the long-term interests of regular participants over those of the accused." This problem also affects common-law jurisdictions. It has been noted that "in the United States, the focus of concern has been the independence of counsel for the defense, while in France, concern focuses on the independence of the examining magistrate."

The examination phase has been described as "the most controversial aspect of criminal procedure" in civil-law jurisdictions because of "[t]he secrecy and length of the proceedings, the large powers enjoyed by examining magistrates" and "the possibility for abuse inherent in the power of the individual magistrate to work in secret and to keep people incarcerated for long periods."

Some commentators, however, have compared the examining magistrate's role favorably to that of the grand jury in common-law systems. Scholar George C. Thomas III finds that while the grand jury as it exists in U.S. law is an effective investigative function, it lacks the screening functions that the French system has. Thomas notes that under U.S. Supreme Court precedent, U.S. prosecutors are not obliged to present exculpatory evidence to grand juries, and as a result, grand jurors hear only evidence from the prosecution. By contrast, under the French system, the French examining magistrate operates as an investigator, and the indicting chamber acts as a screening body expressly responsible for seeking the truth.

== By country ==
The use of the examining magistrate has declined in Europe over time. Spain, France, Croatia, the Netherlands, Belgium and Greece are among the countries to retain the practice. However, in all of these nations, the examining magistrate's role has been diminished, with a general trend of restricting the examining magistrate's involvement to only "serious crimes or sensitive cases", or having the examining magistrate share responsibility with the public prosecutor. Switzerland, Germany, Portugal, and Italy have all abolished the examining-magistrate system.

=== France ===
In France, the investigating judge (juge d'instruction) has been a feature of the judicial system since the mid-19th century, and the preliminary investigative procedure has been a part of the judicial system since at least the 17th century. The sweeping powers traditionally entrusted to them were so broad that Honoré de Balzac called the investigating judge "the most powerful man in France" in the 19th century.

Later, however, the authority of the investigating judges in France was diminished by a series of reforms, initiated in 1985 by French justice minister Robert Badinter. and extending into the 2000s.

Today, investigating judges are one of four types of French magistrates, the others being trial judges (magistrats de siège), public prosecutors (magistrats debout), and policymaking and administrative magistrates at the Ministry of Justice. Each investigating judge is appointed by the president of France upon the recommendation of the Ministry of Justice and serves renewable three-year terms.

An investigating judge initiates an investigation upon an order of the Public Prosecutor (procureur) or upon the request of a private citizen. The investigating judge may issue letters rogatory, order the seizure of necessary evidence, compel witnesses to appear and give evidence, and request expert testimony at an investigative hearing; they may also may have witnesses confront each other and/or the accused.

=== Spain ===
In Spain, a juez de instrucción is an examining judge, and a juzgado de instrucción is the office of an examining judge. Each investigating judge is responsible for investigating "all kind of criminal cases committed in his district, except those cases that fall under the jurisdiction of the National Court (Audiencia Nacional) or where another court has jurisdiction ratione personae." In addition to investigating crimes of all sorts, "the investigating judges are competent to try petty offense cases."

Among the most famous Spanish investigating judges was Baltasar Garzón, a polarizing figure known for investigating high-profile corruption and human rights cases. Garzón was known for invoking the doctrine of universal jurisdiction to issue an international arrest warrant for Chilean dictator Augusto Pinochet, leading to his apprehension in London in 1998. Garzón also gained attention for overseeing an inquiry into atrocities committed during the Spanish Civil War (despite a 1977 amnesty act) and human rights abuses committed during the dictatorship of Francisco Franco. Garzón was convicted of illegal wiretapping in 2012 and was suspended from the bench for 11 years.

=== Andorra ===
The small European nation of Andorra has investigating magistrates; in 2018, for example, an investigating magistrate in the country issued indictments against 28 people, including former Venezuelan officials, on charges of money laundering.

=== Belgium and the Netherlands ===
Both Belgium and the Netherlands retain the examining judge in some cases; examining judges investigate in 5% of cases in Belgium and 2% of cases in the Netherlands.

In Belgium, criminal proceedings are usually initiated by the public prosecutor (Procureur des Konings or procureur du roi), who typically decides whether to issue a summons to a suspect ordering him or her to appear in court. However, in "more serious or complicated cases" the prosecutor can defer to matter to the examining magistrate (onderzoeksrechter or juge d'instruction), who is an independent judge and member of the tribunal of first instance (Rechtbank van eerste aanleg or Tribunal de première instance). The onderzoeksrechter has the power to question suspects, but not under oath, and may also question witnesses, issue search warrants, and issue detention orders. The onderzoeksrechter generates a report on the outcome of the investigation and then refers it to the raadkamer, an arm of the court, to decide whether to dismiss the case, allow it to proceed, or (in certain circumstances) to refer it to another court. The role is unusual, as the onderzoeksrechter simultaneously serves a judge and an officer of the police judiciaire.

In the Netherlands, the position of examining magistrate has existed since 1926, and the powers of the office were strengthened in 1999. Dutch public prosecutors are charged with supervising criminal investigations and ensuring the "legitimacy, fairness and overall integrity" of the investigation and pretrial proceedings. In addition to their investigative role, examining magistrate is also charged with making determinations as to the lawfulness of arrests and as to pretrial detention. The examining magistrate specifically reviews the public prosecutor's request to use some intrusive special investigative techniques when the prosecutor requests the magistrate to do so. For the most intrusive modes of investigation, such as wiretapping or other telecommunication intercepts, public prosecutors must secure the approval of the examining magistrate.

=== Latin America ===
In Latin America, the investigative (sumario or instrucción) phase of a criminal prosecution was historically overseen by an examining magistrate, preceding the trial (plenario) phase. In the first phase, an examining magistrate interviewed the witnesses, questioned the accused, examined evidence, and created a dossier before making a recommendation to the trial judge as to whether the defendant should be discharged or tried. Formerly, in Chile, Paraguay, Uruguay, and Venezuela, "no distinction was made between the examining magistrate, who is responsible for the investigation, and the judge, who issues the rulings. This distinction was considered very important in Europe, where these functions were separated to promote the impartiality of the court." In Chile, for example, examining magistrates formerly had the "triple role" of overseeing the investigation, rendering a verdict, and passing a sentence.

By the end of the 20th century, most Latin American countries followed Germany in eliminating the examination phase. In 1998, Venezuela enacted a legal reform that ended the secrecy of the sumario phase and bolstered the ability of accused persons to prepare a defense. Beginning in 2002, Chile began to incorporate more adversarial aspects into its inquisitorial system, and this reform was implemented fully by 2005. The transition to a separation of judicial and investigative roles meant that public prosecutors (fiscales) obtained many responsibilities that were historically performed by investigative magistrates. However, investigations in past human rights abuses in Chile have continued to use investigative magistrates at the first stage.

=== Greece ===
Greece, which follows a French-style legal system, has retained the investigative magistrate. In Greece, the investigative magistrate interviews witnesses, reviews the evidence, and refers cases to the public prosecutor, who makes the ultimate charging decision. Greek investigative magistrates can also issue arrest warrants.

=== Countries where the position was abolished ===
==== Italy ====
Italy abolished the examining magistrate in 1989, as part of a broader overhaul of the Italian Code of Criminal Procedure. The reform transferred the investigative functions of the examining magistrate to public prosecutors, who in Italy are also considered judges. The reform transferred the oversight functions of examining magistrates to newly created judges of the preliminary investigation with specified duties, including the issuance of search warrants, the authorization of wiretaps, and the decision on pretrial detention. The replacement of examining magistrates was not the only element of the 1989 reform that "marked a departure from the inquisitorial French tradition and partly subscribed to adversarial assumptions"; the code revision introduced cross-examination and negotiation between the parties, although it preserved some elements of the continental legal tradition.

==== Switzerland ====
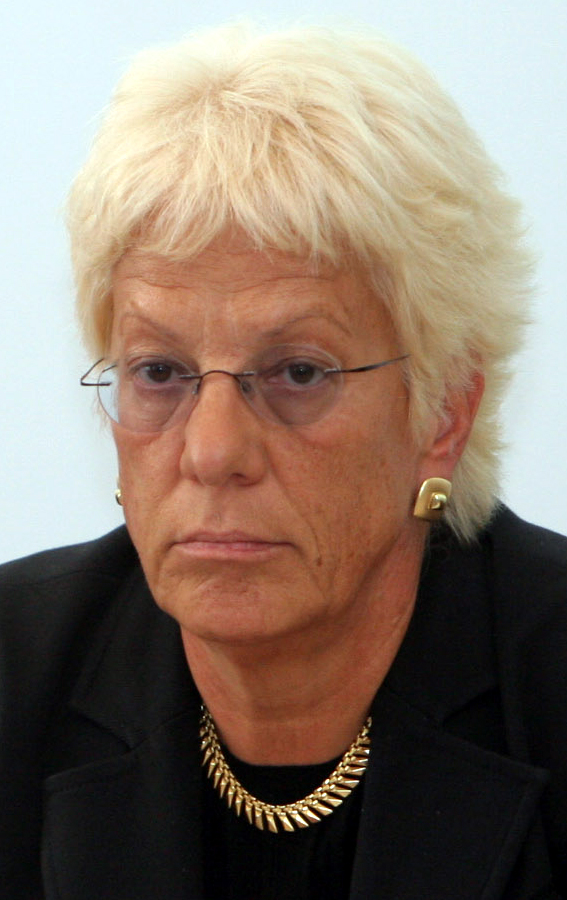
Carla Del Ponte, Swiss investigative magistrate

Before 2011 Switzerland had four different models of inquiry: examining magistrate models I and II (Untersuchungsrichtermodell) and public prosecutor models I and II (Staatsanwaltschaftsmodell). Different cantons of Switzerland used different models. Under "examining magistrate model I" an independent examining magistrate directed the police investigation directly, and the public prosecutor was only a party in the case. Under "examining magistrate model II" the examining magistrate and the public prosecutor jointly directed pre-trial proceedings; "the examining magistrate acted not independently, but was bound by the public prosecutor's instructions." The "public prosecutor model I" followed the multiple-stage French system, in which (1) the public prosecution first directed the investigation by judicial police before transferring the matter to the independent examining magistrate; (2) the examining magistrate conducted examination independent of the prosecutor; and (3) at the end of the examining magistrate's inquiry, the case was returned to the public prosecutor, who made the ultimate decision on "whether to charge or discontinue the case." Finally, under "public prosecutor model II" the examining magistrate was absent altogether and the public prosecutor being the "master of preliminary proceedings" responsible for conducting the investigation and examination, making the decision of whether or not to charge, and prosecuting the case.

When the Swiss Code of Criminal Procedure came into effect in 2011, Switzerland adopted the latter model nationwide, abolished the position of examining magistrate that had previously existed in some cantons.

One prominent Swiss investigative magistrate was Carla Del Ponte, who became prominent for her investigations into Sicilian Mafia crime in Switzerland. Del Ponte was later appointed public prosecutor and then federal attorney general of Switzerland, before becoming chief prosecutor of the International Criminal Tribunal for the former Yugoslavia and the International Criminal Tribunal for Rwanda.

==== Elsewhere ====
Poland historically had examining magistrates; Polish examining magistrate Jan Sehn investigated the Nazi atrocities at Auschwitz in preparation for the Auschwitz trials. However, in 1949, the Polish judiciary was restructured along Soviet lines, and the position of investigating magistrate was eliminated.

West Germany abolished the examining magistrate at the end of 1974. Portugal abolished the examining magistrate in 1987.

== In popular culture ==
The 1969 film Z stars an examining magistrate based on Christos Sartzetakis.

== See also ==
- Magistrate (England and Wales)
- United States magistrate judge
