= Belgian Judicial Code =

Code of law in Belgium

Belgian Federal Parliament
- Territorial extent: Belgium
- Passed by: Belgian Chamber of Rep.
- Passed: 22 June 1967
- Passed by: Belgian Senate
- Passed: 29 June 1967
- Royal assent: 10 October 1967
- Commenced: 1 November 1970

Summary
- This code governs the organisation of the courts and tribunals of Belgium, their jurisdiction and their procedure.
- Status: In force

The Belgian Judicial Code (Dutch: Gerechtelijk Wetboek, French: Code Judiciaire, German: Gerichtsgesetzbuch) is a code of law in the country of Belgium, formally adopted on 10 October 1967 and currently still in force. The Judicial Code governs the organisation of the courts and tribunals of the Belgian judiciary, their jurisdiction, as well as the applicable rules of civil procedure. As such, the Judicial Code is one of the important codes of law in the Belgian legal system.

In criminal proceedings however, the jurisdiction and rules of procedure of the courts and tribunals of Belgium are governed by the Belgian Code of Criminal Procedure.

== History ==
The proposed law containing the Judicial Code was passed by the Belgian Chamber of Representatives on 22 June 1967 and by the Belgian Senate on 29 June 1967.

The adopted law was subsequently promulgated by Baudouin, King of the Belgians on 10 October 1967, and entered into force on 1 November 1970. The Judicial Code has been amended many times since.

== Contents ==
=== Part I: General principles ===
This part of the code (articles 1–57) contains general provisions regarding the adjudication of cases and the value of judgments and rulings.

=== Part II: Judicial organization ===
This part of the code (articles 58–555/16) consists of six 'books':

- Book I: Bodies of the judiciary (articles 58–287novies) establishes the bodies that constitute the judiciary, and governs the appointment and career of judicial officers and court personnel;
- Book II: Judicial offices (articles 288–427quater) governs the duties, the remuneration and the retirement of judicial officers and court personnel, as well as disciplinary procedures regarding their offices and professions;
- Book III: Bar (articles 428–508) governs the practice of the profession of attorney, and establishes their professional bodies;
- Book IIIbis: First-line and second-line legal aid (articles 508/1–508/25) regulates the provision of first-line and second-line legal aid;
- Book IV: Court bailiffs (articles 509–555quinquies) governs the practice of the office of court bailiff, and establishes their professional bodies;
- Book V: Court experts and sworn translators, interpreters and translator-interpreters (articles 555/6–555/16) governs the practice of the professions of court expert, translator, interpreter and translator-interpreter.

=== Part III: Competence ===
This part of the code (articles 556–663) lays down the jurisdiction of each of the courts and tribunals, and the procedures to settle jurisdictional conflicts between them.

=== Part IV: Civil procedure ===
This part of the code (articles 664–1385octiesdecies) consists of four 'books':

- Book I: Legal aid (articles 664–699ter) regulates the provision of legal aid;
- Book II: Proceedings (articles 700–1041) governs the manner in which actions ought to be brought and adjudicated, and the applicable rules of evidence;
- Book III: Means of recourse (articles 1042–1147bis) establishes the legal remedies against judgments and rulings (including opposition, appeal, appeal in cassation, third-party opposition, retraction and judicial misconduct proceedings);
- Book IV: Particular procedures (articles 1148–1385octiesdecies) establishes a number of procedures for specific cases (including amongst other things: surveys, court auctions, probate proceedings, adoptions, deferral of payment, tenancy matters, ...).

=== Part V: Provisional seizures, means of execution and collective debt settlement ===
This part of the code (articles 1386–1675/27) governs the manner in which to conduct sequestrations, seizures and attachments of property, lays down the procedures for collective debt settlements, and establishes central registers for seizure and debt settlement records.

=== Part VI: Arbitration ===
This part of the code (articles 1676–1723/1) governs the practice and conduct of out-of-court arbitration proceedings, as well as the value of and means of recourse against arbitral awards.

=== Part VII: Mediation ===
This part of the code (articles 1724–1737) governs the practice and conduct of both court-ordered and out-of-court mediation, as well as the value of settlements.

=== Part VIII: Collaborative law ===
This part of the code (articles 1738–1747) governs the practice and conduct of collaborative law.

=== Annex: Territorial boundaries and seats of courts and tribunals ===
This annex to the code (articles 1–6) prescribes the territorial boundaries of the judicial cantons, arrondissements ("districts") and areas, as well as the seat of the courts and tribunals of these territories.
