= Schematic overview of Belgian institutions =

Brief description of Belgian government structure

The table below provides a schematic and hierarchic overview of the institutions of the Belgian federated state, according to the principle of the Trias Politica (the theoretical concept of the Separation of political powers) in law-making, executive and judicial powers (the horizontal separation of powers) and according to their territorial level or so called subsidiarity (the vertical separation of powers).

Geographic level	Legislative power	Executive power	Judicial power
Belgium: National level (federation)	Federal parliament : is a bicameral parliament like in Britain and consist of the Senate and the Chamber of Representatives	The King of the Belgians is the head of State (mainly ceremonial duties), the executive power is executed by the bilingual Belgian Federal government (Council of ministers)	Council of State, Constitutional Court of Belgium, and the Court of Cassation
Community level: the communities are competent in so called "personal matters" (except religious affairs) such as culture, sports and education			
Dutch-speaking community : covers the territory of all Flemish provinces and Brussels (*)	Flemish Parliament counts 124 directly elected members (118 from the Flemish provinces + 6 Brussels members)	Flemish government	Council of State
French-speaking community : all Walloon provinces (except the German-speaking communities ) and Brussels	Parliament of the French Community: 94 members (75 Wallon provinces + 19 Brussels members)	French Community Government	Council of State
German-speaking community: German speaking municipalities	Parliament of the German-speaking community	Government of the German-speaking community	Council of State
Regional level: Regions: The regional political institutions are competent for regional matters like urbanisation, economy, agriculture and fishery, public infrastructure & traffic, international trade, the law and decrees governing local administrations and monitoring of the municipalities and provinces.			
Flemish region : The legislative and executive competences of the Flemish region and Dutch-speaking community have been combined; All Flemish provinces except the 19 communities of the Brussels region	Flemish Parliament counts 118 directly elected members	Flemish government	Council of State
Walloon region : All Walloon provinces except the Brussels region	Parliament of Wallonia	Government of Wallonia	Council of State
Brussels Capital region	Brussels Capital parliament	Brussels Capital government	Council of State
Subregional levels			
Provincial level	Provincial council	Provincial Governor Deputies	5 courts of appeal, 11 court of assizes
Arrondissement		Arrondissemental commisar (formerly Prefect under French occupation)	Tribunal of first instance
Cities and local communities councils	Community councils	Mayor and Aldermen	Justice of the peace, police tribunal

(*) a part of the executive responsibilities in Brussels are executed by the Flemish Community council (for Brussels) (VGC). This is not a government but a subsidiary executive organ.
