= Beatrijs Deconinck =

Belgian lawyer and judge (born 1955)

President of the Court of Cassation of Belgium
- In office 26 April 2019 – 19 April 2024
- Preceded by: Jean de Codt
- Succeeded by: Eric de Formanoir de la Cazerie

Personal details
- Born: 5 July 1955 (age 71) Ypres, Belgium
- Education: Ghent University

Beatrijs Deconinck (born 5 July 1955) is a Belgian lawyer, academic and judge. She served as the first female president of the Court of Cassation of Belgium between 2019 and 2024.

== Career ==
Deconinck was born on 5 July 1955 in Ypres, Belgium. She got a degree in law and criminology from Ghent University in 1978.

She worked as lawyer in Ypres between 1978 and 1990. Her judicial career began in 1990 when she was appointed a judge at the Court of First Instance in Veurne; In 1995 she was appointed a judge at the Ghent Court of Appeal and was promoted to the Court of Cassation of Belgium in 2006, becoming a section president in 2014.

Deconinck has also worked as a civil and commercial judge for the European Judicial Network, as well as a professor at the Institute of Procedural Law at Ghent University soon after graduation. She is co-chair of the Inter-University Centre for Judicial Law and the author of numerous publications on civil procedural law, covering the efficient management of judicial proceedings, procedural economy and a responsible approach to procedural sanctions. Deconinck is also substitute judge at the Benelux Court of Justice.

In November 2018 the High Council of Justice appointed Deconinck as the new president of the Court of Cassation, to succeed Jean de Codt. Deconinck was sworn in before King Philippe on 3 April 2019 and was officially installed and began her term of office on 26 April as the first woman president of the Court. She was succeeded on 19 April 2024 by Eric de Formanoir de la Cazerie.
