= Constitution of Belgium =

Fundamental law of Belgium, most recently revised in 1993

Constitution of Kingdom of Belgium
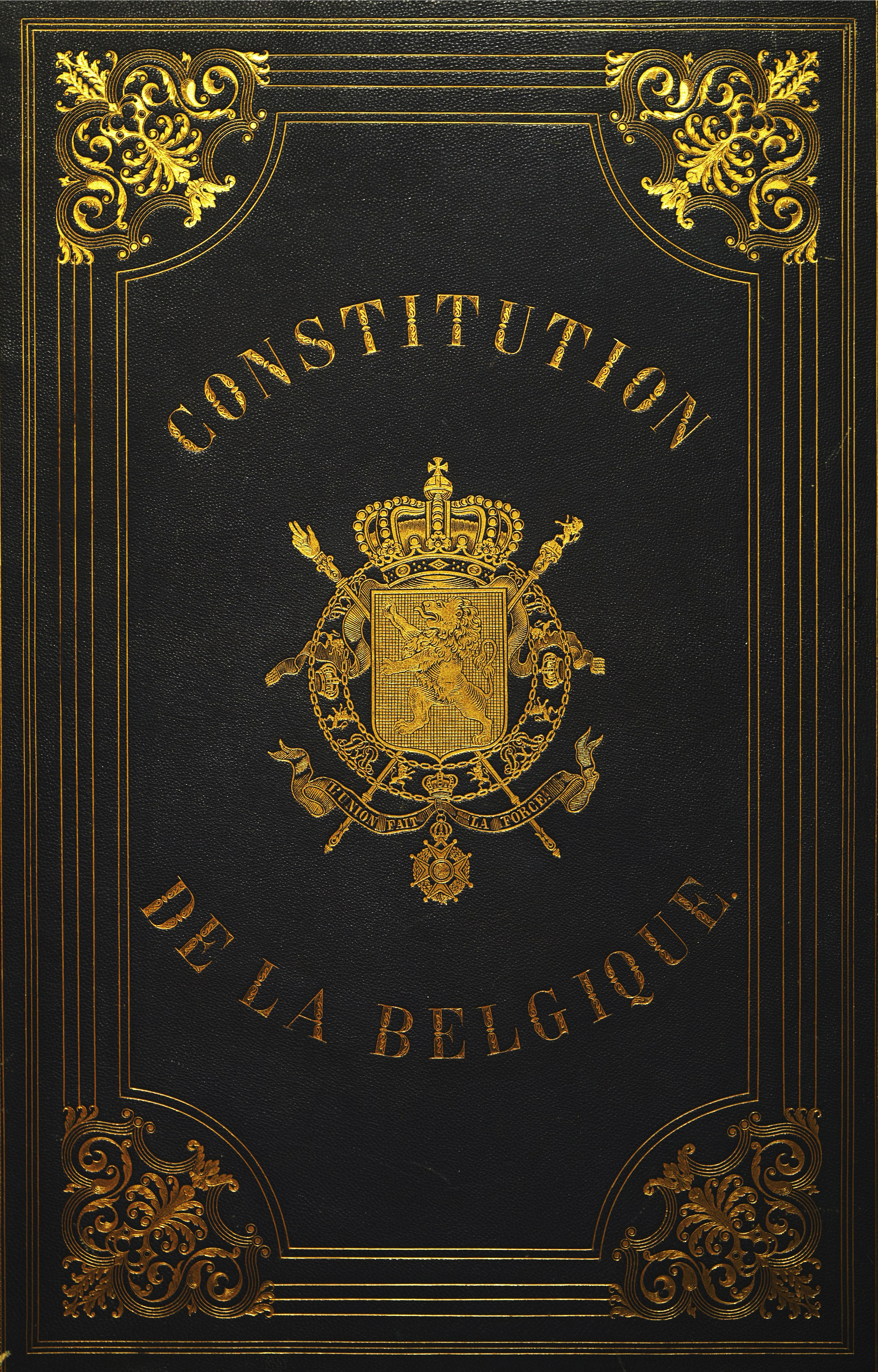
- Constitution of Belgium (1831)

Overview
- Original title: (in French) Constitution du 7 février 1831
- Jurisdiction: Belgium
- Ratified: 7 February 1831; 195 years ago
- Date effective: Before 21 February 1831; 195 years ago
- System: Parliamentary Monarchy

Government structure
- Branches: Three (executive, legislature and judiciary)
- Chambers: Two (Senate and Chamber of Representatives)
- Executive: King and their Government responsible to the Chamber of Representatives; Prime minister as head of government
- Judiciary: Court of Cassation
- Federalism: Federal, with 3 regions and 3 communities
- Last amended: 2017

Full text
- Constitution of Belgium at Wikisource

The Constitution of Belgium (Dutch: Belgische Grondwet; French: Constitution belge; German: Verfassung Belgiens) dates back to 1831. Since then Belgium has been a parliamentary monarchy that applies the principles of ministerial responsibility for the government policy and the separation of powers.

The most recent major change to the constitution was the introduction of the Court of Arbitration, whose competencies were expanded by a special law of 2003, to include Title II (Articles 8 to 32), and the Articles 170, 172 and 191 of the Constitution. The Court developed into a constitutional court; in May 2007 it was formally redesignated as the Constitutional Court. This court has the authority to examine whether a law or a decree is in compliance with Title II and Articles 170, 172 and 191.

== Historical aspects ==
=== Origins and adoption ===
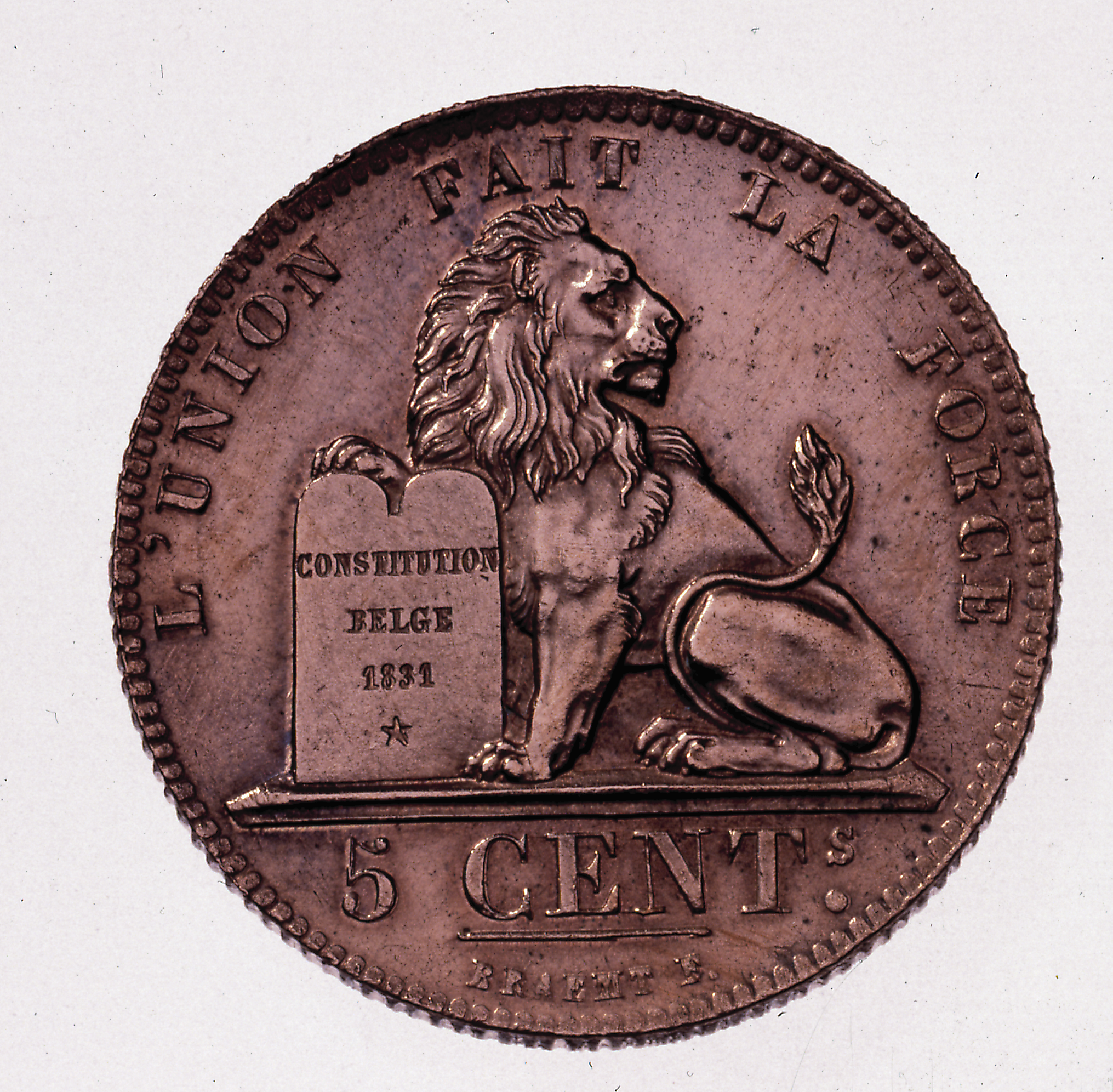
The Constitution depicted as the Tablets of Stone on a Belgian coin, guarded by the Belgian lion

The Belgian Constitution of 1831 was created in the aftermath of the secession of Belgium from the United Netherlands in the Belgian Revolution. After the revolution's initial success, an elected National Congress was convened in November 1830 to devise a political order for the new state. The members of the National Congress reflected a variety of political ideals, but the vast majority supported the "Union of Oppositions" which had emerged before the revolution. This brought together moderate liberals with liberally inclined Catholics. As three modern historians describe:

The 1831 constitution was [...] a compromise between the landowners and clergy on the one hand and the liberal middle class on the other. The conservative forces were willing to adapt to the inevitable changes in society but this willingness was aimed at retaining the organic link with the past and preventing radical change. The liberal middle class, in spite of their desire for systematic, radical reform with a view to its expansion, showed restraint, a typical reaction of early liberalism.

The result was a "carefully balanced compromise" that mixed some radical liberal aspects with a firmly conservative ethos. It was inspired by the precedents of the French constitutions of 1791, 1814 and 1830, the Dutch constitution of 1814 and English constitutional principles. Belgium was established as a constitutional monarchy with a bicameral legislature. Powers were separated between the executive, legislative, and judiciary. The Constitution guaranteed the freedoms of expression, education, religion and of the press, though the franchise was severely limited by a property tax qualification. Though liberal in many respects, the constitution also placed the Catholic Church in a privileged position. Despite mandating the separation of Church and State, the Church was given a favoured position while maintaining its independence. The draft document was completed on 7 February 1831.

=== Political significance ===
The Constitution of 1831 was a highly visible national symbol of Belgian nationalism throughout the 19th century. A.V. Dicey, a British legal theorist, concluded that the Belgian document codified a number of conventions long established in the United Kingdom, saying that it "indeed comes very near to a written reproduction of the English constitution". It also inspired contemporary liberal movements in other European countries, including Denmark which adopted its first constitution in 1849 based partly on the Belgian precedent. The historian J.A. Hawgood wrote:

The Belgian constitution of 1831 rapidly replaced the Spanish Constitution of 1812—except in the remoter backwoods of Latin Europe and Latin America—as the beacon-light for liberals and radicals who did not stand so far to the left [...] that they wanted to overthrow all monarchies and replace them by republics. Wherever a strictly limited constitutional monarchy was the ideal – there stood the Belgium of King Leopold as a shining example. Hers was the constitution that 'had everything' – the sovereignty of the people clearly recognised, a monarch and a dynasty owing their position to having taken an oath to honour the constitution, a bicameral legislature, both houses of which were completely elected by the people, an independent judiciary, a clergy paid by the state but independent of it, and a declaration of the rights of the citizen firmly based on the principles of 1776 and 1789, yet in a number of respects containing improvements upon these.

In the 19th century, a "constitutional cult" emerged in Belgium which extolled it as a popular symbol of national identity.

=== Subsequent development ===
The Constitution of 1831 originally established Belgium as a unitary state organised at three levels: national level, provinces and municipalities. State reform in Belgium reconfigured the Belgian political system into on a federal model which entailed significant amendments to the original document.

The official version of the Constitution of 1831 was written in French and was only comprehensible to part of the national population. An official version in Dutch was only adopted in 1967. Up to then, the Dutch text was only a translation without legal value. Since 1991 there is also an official German version of the Constitution.

The original constitutional document is currently in possession of the archives of the Belgian Federal Parliament. In 2020, two researchers claimed the document was being stored in subpar conditions in "a cupboard" in the Parliamentary Secretariat. However, this was disputed by the secretarial staff.

== Legal aspects ==
=== Federal Belgium, its composition and territory ===
Belgium is a federal State composed of Communities and Regions.

— Article 1 of the Belgian Constitution

Since 1993, the first article of the Constitution stipulates that Belgium is a federal state composed of Communities and Regions. This means that there are two types of devolved entities at the same level, with neither taking precedence over the other.

Article 2 divides Belgium into three communities: the Flemish Community, the French Community and the German-speaking Community, whereas Article 3 divides Belgium into three regions: the Flemish Region, the Walloon Region and the Brussels Region. Article 4 divides Belgium into four language areas: The Dutch language area, the French language area, the bilingual (French and Dutch) area of Brussels-Capital and the German language area. Each municipality of the Kingdom is part of one of these four language areas only. The borders of the language areas can be changed or corrected only by a law supported by specific majorities of each language group of each Chamber.

Article 5 divides the Flemish Region and the Walloon Region into five provinces each and foresees possible future provincial redivisions of the Belgian territory. Article 6 determines that the provinces can be subdivided only by Law. The borders of the State, provinces and municipalities can be changed or corrected only by Law (article 7).

==== General policy objectives ====
In 2007, a Title 1bis was inserted in the Belgian Constitution, titled "General policy objectives of the federal Belgium, the communities and the regions", which to date comprises only one article: Article 7bis. This article states the following: "In the exercise of their respective competences, the federal State, the communities and the regions shall strive for the objectives of a sustainable development in its social, economic and environmental dimensions, taking into account the solidarity between the generations." The act inserting this article was published in the Belgian Official Journal on 26 April 2007.

=== The Belgians and their rights ===
Title II of the Belgian Constitution is titled The Belgians and their rights. In this title a number of rights and freedoms are enumerated. Although the Constitution speaks of the rights of the Belgians, in principle they apply to all persons on Belgian soil. In addition to the rights enumerated in Title II of the Constitution, the Belgians also enjoy the rights enshrined in the European Convention on Human Rights.

Articles 8 and 9 determine how the Belgian nationality can be obtained. Article 8 also stipulates that the law can grant the right to vote in elections to citizens of the European Union who do not have the Belgian nationality, in accordance with Belgium's international and supranational obligations, and to non-EU citizens. Article 9 stipulates that naturalisation can only be granted by the federal legislative power, however, Article 74 of the Constitution stipulates that only the Chamber of Representatives, and not the Senate, can grant naturalisation.

There is no distinction of classes in the State.
All Belgians are equal before the law; they alone are admissible to
civil and military offices, save for the exceptions that can be
established by law for special cases.
Equality between men and women is guaranteed.

— Article 10 of the Belgian Constitution

Article 10 determines that all Belgians are equal before the law. Article 11 determines that all rights and freedoms must be guaranteed without discrimination. Article 12 guarantees the liberty of the person and stipulates that no one can be prosecuted except in the cases determined by the law and in accordance with the procedures established by law. Article 13 determines that everyone has the right to go to court. Article 14 guarantees the application of the principle of nulla poena sine lege (Latin: "no penalty without a law"). There is also an Article 14bis, which was inserted in the Belgian Constitution in 2005, that states as follows: "The death penalty is abolished".

Articles 15 of the Constitution guard against unreasonable searches. It determines that the domicile is inviolable and that searches can only take place in the cases and the manner the law prescribes. Article 16 stipulates that no one can be deprived of their property except when it's in the public interest, in the cases and the manner the law prescribes, and that fair and prior compensation must be made.

Article 17 of the Constitution stipulates that the penalty of forfeiture of (all) assets cannot be instituted. Article 18 further stipulates that the penalty of civil death is abolished, and that it cannot be brought back into force. Civil death was a penalty in Belgium in the Ancien Régime.

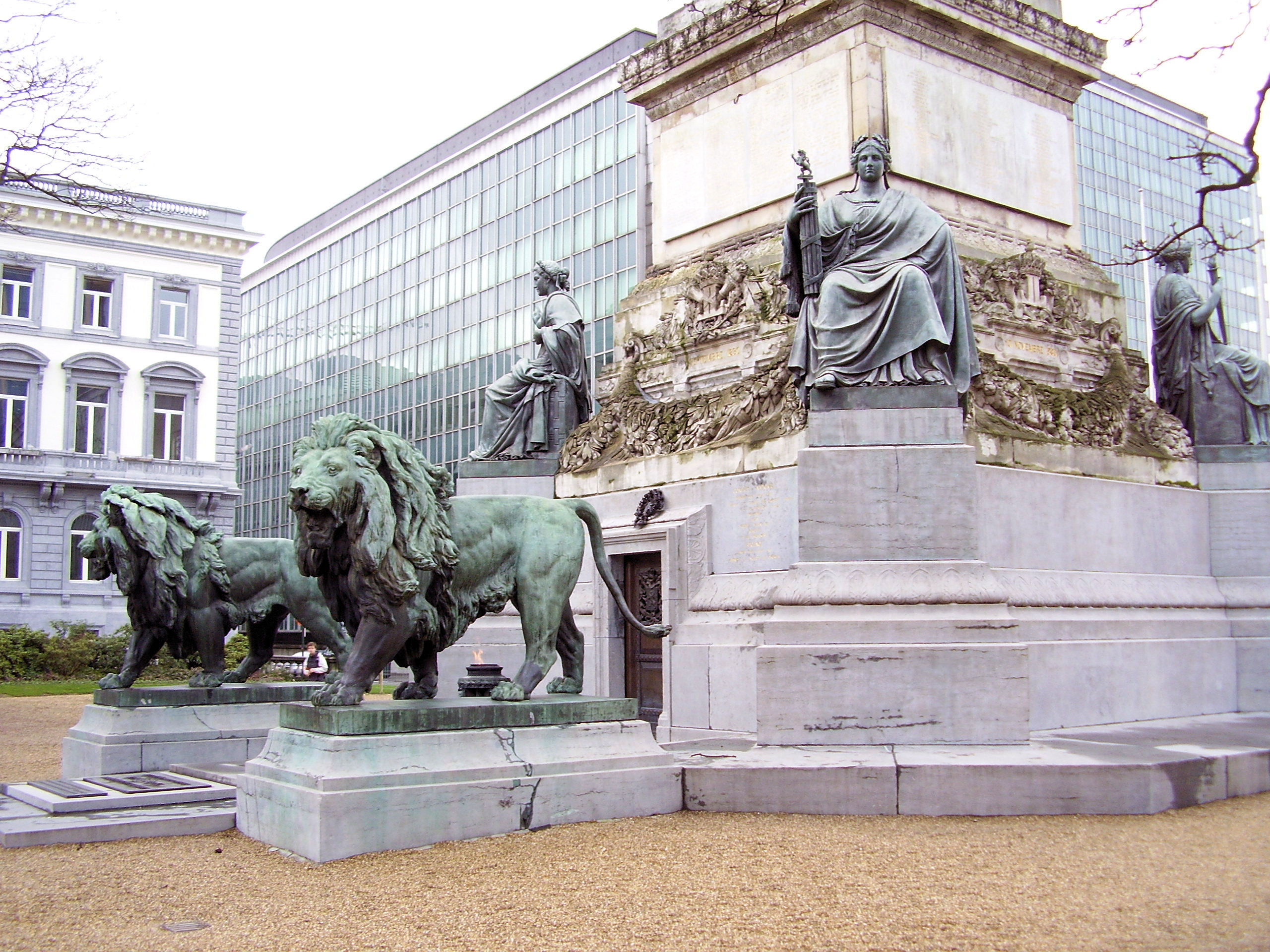
The four sitting statues on the pedestal of the Congress Column represent the four basic freedoms enshrined in the Belgian Constitution of 1831: the freedom of religion, association, education and the press.

Articles 19 to 21 guarantee the freedom of religion. Article 19 protects the freedom of religion and the right to exercise it publicly. It also guarantees the freedom of speech by stipulating that everyone has the right to express their opinion freely. However, Article 19 also determines that abuses of these freedoms can be punished, a principle which is controversially applied in the Belgian Holocaust denial law, which made it an offence to publicly "deny, minimise, justify or approve of the genocide committed by the German National Socialist regime during the Second World War".

Article 22 determines that everyone has the right to respect for their private life and for their family life. Exceptions can only be instituted by law. Article 22bis stipulates that every child has the right to respect for their "moral, physical, mental and sexual integrity".

Article 23 protects the right to lead a life in conformity with human dignity. This right specifically encompasses the following rights:

- the right to work and free choice of employment, within the framework of an employment policy aimed at ensuring a stable and high level of employment, to just conditions of work and fair remuneration, as well as the right to information, consultation and collective bargaining;
- The right to social security, to health care and to social, medical and legal assistance;
- The right to decent housing;
- The right to the protection of a healthy environment; and
- The right to cultural and social development.

Article 24 protects the freedom of education and the parents' right to choose. It also stipulates that the community must provide neutral education, and that this neutrality includes, among others, the respect for the philosophical, ideological and religious views of parents and pupils. The third paragraph of this article determines that everyone has the right to education, with respect for the fundamental rights and freedoms, and that education shall be free in its compulsory stages. (In Belgium, education is compulsory until the age of 18.)

Article 25 of the Constitution guarantees the freedom of the press and stipulates that censorship can never be established. Article 26 protects the freedom of assembly by determining that everyone has the right to gather peaceably and without arms. Article 27 guarantees the freedom of association. Article 28 ensures the right to petition the public authorities. Article 29 determines that the confidentiality of letters is inviolable.

Article 30 stipulates that the use of the languages spoken in Belgium is free. It further stipulates that the use of a specific language can only be imposed by law and only for the proceedings and acts of the public authorities and for legal proceedings. Article 31 of the Constitution determines that no prior authorisation is required to prosecute civil servants for acts of their administration. Article 32 stipulates that everyone has the right to consult any administrative document and to obtain a copy thereof, except as provided by law or decree.

Since 2003, the Belgian Court of Arbitration, which is known now as the Constitutional Court, can examine whether laws, decrees or ordinances are in compliance with Title II and with Articles 170, 172 and 191 (on the equality of Belgians and foreigners and the prohibition of tax discrimination) of the Constitution. When interpreting the rights enumerated in Title II of the Constitution, the Constitutional Court also applies the European Convention on Human Rights in order to prevent different interpretations of the same principles.

=== The Powers ===
All powers emanate from the Nation.
They are exercised in the manner established by the Constitution.

— Article 33 of the Belgian Constitution

Title III of the Belgian Constitution is titled The Powers. It consists of Articles 33 to 166 and is subdivided into eight chapters, four of which are further subdivided into several sections. It is by far the largest title of the Constitution. In this title, the Belgian system of government is outlined, in accordance with the principle of the separation of powers.

Article 34 of the Constitution expressly stipulates that the exercise of certain powers or responsibilities can be attributed to international public institutions by treaty or by law. This refers, among others, to Belgium's membership in the European Union.

Article 36 grants the federal legislative power to the King, the Chamber of Representatives and the Senate. Although it states that the federal legislative power must be exercised jointly by its three components, in practice only the Federal Parliament, which consists of the Chamber of Representatives and the Senate, exercises the federal legislative power. However, laws still require the King's signature.

Article 37 vests the federal executive power in the King, but in practice it is exercised by the Federal Government.

Article 38 and 39 define the competencies and responsibilities of the Communities and the Regions. Article 38 provides that each Community has the competencies that are granted to it by the Constitution or by the laws adopted pursuant to the Constitution. Article 39 provides that a law adopted with a qualified majority can assign competencies to the regional organs which it establishes.

Article 40 vests the judicial power in the courts and tribunals and provides that their rulings and decisions are carried out in the King's name.

==== Legislative branch ====
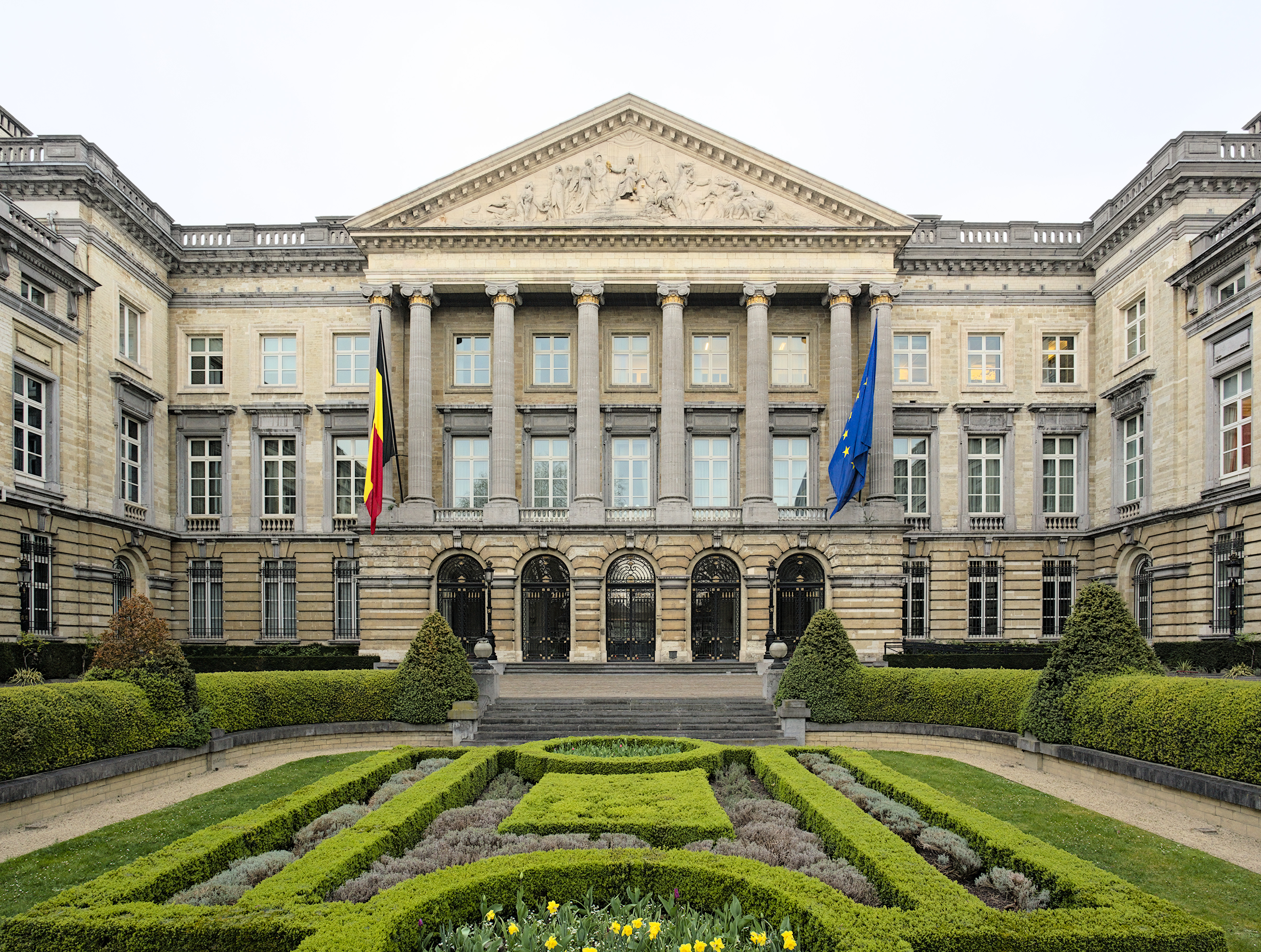
The Palace of the Nation in Brussels houses the Belgian Federal Parliament

Chapter I, which is titled The federal Chambers, establishes the composition, manner of election, qualifications of members and organisation of the bicameral Federal Parliament, which consists of the Chamber of Representatives and the Senate. It is divided into three parts: the first part contains the provisions that are common to both Chambers whereas the two other parts, Section I, titled The Chamber of Representatives, and Section II, titled The Senate, include provisions that only apply to one of the two Chambers.

The members of the Chamber of Representatives and the directly elected members of the Senate are elected by all Belgian citizens who are not less than 18 years old and who do not fall into any of the categories of exclusion determined by law. Article 61 further stipulates that each voter has only one vote. In principle, there is a federal election every 4 years, but it is possible that the Federal Parliament is dissolved early and that thus early elections are held. In order to be eligible for election one must have the Belgian nationality, have the full enjoyment of civil and political rights, be at least 21 years old and be resident in Belgium. No other condition of eligibility can be imposed.

Chapter II, which is titled The federal legislative power, describes the powers of the legislative branch. Article 74 determines the cases in which the federal legislative power is exercised only by the King and the Chamber of Representatives, and not by the Senate. Article 75 stipulates that each branch of the federal legislative power has the right of initiative. This means that both the members of the Chamber of Representatives or of the Senate and the King, in practice the Federal Government, have the right to propose bills. Article 77 determines the matters with respect to which the Chamber of Representatives and the Senate have equal competence. Articles 78 to 83 further outline parliamentary procedure and the relations between both parts of the Federal Parliament.

==== The Monarch ====
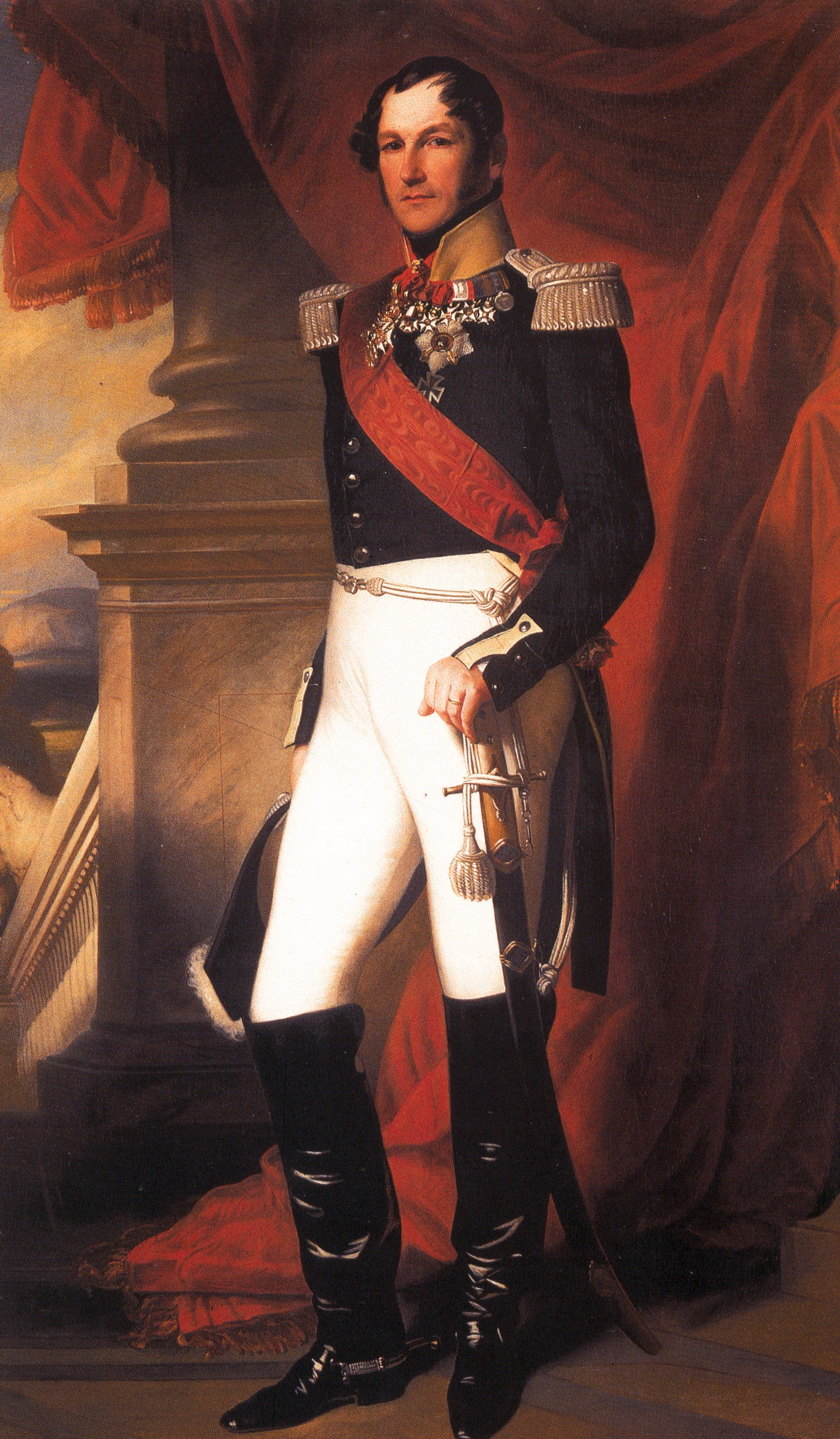
Article 85 of the Belgian Constitution vests the King's constitutional powers in the offspring of Leopold I.

Chapter III, which is titled The King and the Federal Government, consists of the Articles 85 to 114. It is divided into three sections. Section I, titled The King, establishes the monarchy, the method of succession and contains provisions regarding the regency. Section II, titled The Federal Government, establishes the Federal Government and the method of appointment of its members. Section III, titled The competences, defines the constitutional powers of the King, which are, in practice, exercised by the Federal Government.

Article 85 provides that the King's constitutional powers are hereditary through the direct, natural and legitimate descent from King Leopold I, by order of primogeniture. However, in Title IX, which contains certain transitional provisions, there is a clause that stipulates that Article 85 in its current shall be applicable for the first time on the descent of King Albert II, which means that the female offspring of King Albert II and later monarchs are in the line of succession to the Belgian throne, whereas the female offspring of all previous Belgian kings are excluded from the throne. This transitional clause was inserted to regulate the transition from the Salic law, which barred women and their descendants from the throne and was in effect until 1991.

Article 85 further provides that a descendant of Leopold I who marries without the King's consent, or the consent of those exercising the King's powers in the cases provided by the Constitution, is deprived of his rights to the crown. It also stipulates that those who lose their right to the crown in this manner, can be restored to the line of succession with the consent of both Chambers of the Federal Parliament. Again, a transitional provision was inserted in Title IX stipulating that the marriage of Princess Astrid of Belgium and Archduke Lorenz of Austria-Este, is deemed to have received such consent. This provision was inserted because, as their marriage took place in 1984, before women were included in the line of succession, their marriage did not require the King's consent at the time.

Article 86 provides that, if there are no descendants of King Leopold I, then the King can name a successor with the consent of both Chambers of the Federal Parliament. This consent cannot be given unless a quorum of at least two-thirds of its members is present and at least two-thirds of the votes cast are in the affirmative. In case no successor has been appointed in this manner, the throne is vacant. Article 95 stipulates that, if the throne is vacant, then the United Chambers meet to provisionally provide for the regency. Subsequently, a federal election must take place and the newly elected Federal Parliament must meet within two months to permanently fill the vacancy.

The United Chambers also have to provide for the regency in two other cases, in accordance with Articles 92 and 93: if the successor to the throne is a minor or if the King is unable to reign. In both cases, the United Chambers also have to make provisions regarding the guardianship. Article 94 stipulates that the regency can only be conferred on one person and that the Regent can only enter into office after taking the same constitutional oath that the King must take before he can accede to the throne. Article 93 also stipulates that the ministers must establish the inability to reign and subsequently convene the Chambers of the Federal Parliament.

Article 90 provides that, upon the death of the monarch, the Federal Parliament must convene without convocation no later than ten days following the monarch's death. If the Chambers had been dissolved and the act of dissolution provided for the convocation of the new Chambers at a date later than the tenth day following the monarch's demise, then the old Chambers enter into function again until the new Chambers convene. It also provides that, between the monarch's demise and the taking of the oath of his successor or the Regent, the constitutional powers of the King are exercised by the Council of Ministers, in the name of the Belgian people.

Article 90 and Article 93, regarding the inability to reign, were controversially applied in 1990 during the so-called Abortion Question, which arose when King Baudouin I refused to sign a bill liberalising Belgium's abortion laws into law, citing religious convictions. The Belgian Government subsequently declared him unable to reign on 4 April 1990 and the ministers signed and promulgated the bill instead. The following day, King Baudouin I was restored to royal power by the United Chambers.

In accordance with Article 87 of the Constitution, the King cannot simultaneously be the head of state of another country without the consent of both Chambers of the Federal Parliament. A personal union is only possible with the approval of two-thirds of the votes cast in both Chambers, and a quorum of two-thirds of the members of the Chamber must be present in order for the approval to be valid. This article was used only once, in 1885, when King Leopold II of Belgium also became the sovereign ruler of the Congo Free State.

==== Executive branch ====
The second section of Chapter III deals with the composition and the functioning of the Federal Government. Article 96 provides that the King appoints and dismisses his ministers. It further provides that the Federal Government must tender its resignation to the King when the Chamber of Representatives, by an absolute majority of its members, adopts a constructive motion of no confidence which presents a successor to the Prime Minister to the King for appointment, or presents a successor to the Prime Minister to the King for appointment within three days following the rejection of a motion of confidence. The King then appoints the proposed successor to Prime Minister. In this case, the new Prime Minister enters into office on the moment that the new Federal Government takes the oath.

Articles 97 to 99 contain provisions regarding the membership of the Federal Government. Article 97 stipulates that only Belgian nationals can be ministers and Article 98 provides that no member of the Belgian royal family can be a minister. Article 99 provides that the Council of Ministers cannot have more than 15 members and that the Council of Ministers must comprise as many Dutch-speaking as French-speaking members, with the possible exception of the Prime Minister.

The King has no powers other than those expressly
attributed to him by the Constitution and by specific laws
adopted pursuant to the Constitution itself.

— Article 105 of the Belgian Constitution

Section III deals with the competences and the powers of the King, which are, in practice, exercised by the Federal Government. Article 105 expressly determines that the King has no powers other than those expressly attributed to him by the Constitution and the laws adopted pursuant thereof. This article establishes the principle that the federal executive power has no powers or competences other than those attributed to it by the federal legislative power.

Article 106 stipulates that the King's acts are not valid unless countersigned by a minister. This means while the King is vested with executive power, he is not politically responsible for exercising it. Rather, he must exercise it through the ministers; the countersigning minister assumes political responsibility for the act. This is the direct result of the inviolability of the King's person, which is established by Article 88, and the principle of ministerial responsibility, which is established by Article 101. For example, when a new government takes office, the outgoing Prime Minister countersigns the Act of Appointment of the new Prime Minister, who then countersigns his predecessor's Act of Resignation.

==== Communities and Regions ====
Chapter IV, which is titled The Communities and the Regions, contains the Articles 115 to 140. It is divided into two sections, which are in turn subdivided into subsections. Section I is titled The organs and establishes the organs of the Communities and the Regions and their functioning. It is subdivided into two subsections on, respectively, the Community and Regional Parliaments and the Community and Regional Governments. Section II is titled The competences and further defines the competences and responsibilities of the Communities and the Regions. It is subdivided into three subsections on, respectively, the competences of the Communities, the competences of the Regions and one containing special provisions relative to these competences.

Article 115 of section I establishes the Parliament of the Flemish Community, known as the Flemish Parliament, the Parliament of the French Community and the Parliament of the German-speaking Community. It further provides that there shall be a parliament for each Region, this resulted in the Walloon Parliament and the Brussels Parliament. The Flemish Parliament exercises both the competences of the Parliament of the Flemish Community and the Parliament of the Flemish Region. Article 116 stipulates that the community and regional parliaments are composed of elected members. The members of a community parliament must be directly elected to that community parliament or to a regional parliament, which is the case for the Parliament of the French Community, and the same applies to the regional parliaments.

The members of the community and regional parliaments are elected for a term of office of 5 years and, in accordance with Article 117 of the Constitution, these elections must coincide with the elections to the European Parliament, except when provided otherwise by special law. Article 119 provides that a member of the parliament of a community or region cannot be a member of the Federal Parliament at the same time, the only exception are the Community Senators who represent the parliament of their Community or Region in the Senate, and Article 120 grants the members of community and regional parliaments the same parliamentary immunity as members of the Federal Parliament.

Article 121 establishes the Flemish Government, the Government of the French Community and the Government of the German-speaking Community and provides that each region shall also have a government. The Flemish Government is the government of both the Flemish Community and the Flemish Region. The members of each community or regional government are elected by their respective parliament.

Section II determines the competences and the responsibilities of the Communities and Regions. Article 127 of subsection I provides that the Flemish Parliament and the Parliament of the French Community are responsible for cultural matters and education, however, the Communities are, with regard to education, not responsible for determining the age at which compulsory education begins and ends, the minimum conditions for awarding degrees and pensions. Article 128 stipulates that the Flemish Parliament and the Parliament of the French Community are responsible for the matters related to the individual. In addition, the Flemish Parliament and the Parliament of the French Community are also responsible for the cooperation between the communities and have the power to make treaties with regard to their competences.

In accordance with Article 129, the Flemish Parliament and the Parliament of the French Community are also responsible for legislation regarding the use of languages in administration and the conduct of official business, in education and in the relations between employers and their personnel, within certain limits. They can not pass legislation regarding the use of languages with regard to cases where the Federal Parliament is responsible, municipalities with linguistic facilities, certain services and federal and international institutions.

Article 130 establishes the competences of the Parliament of the German-speaking Community. It stipulates that the Parliament of the German-speaking Community is responsible for cultural matters, the matters related to the individual, education, within the same limits as the other community parliaments, the cooperation between the communities and international cooperation, including the power to make treaties with regard to its competences, and the use of languages in education. Unlike for the other communities, the laws regarding the competences of the German-speaking Community do not require a special majority in the Federal Parliament.

==== Judicial branch ====
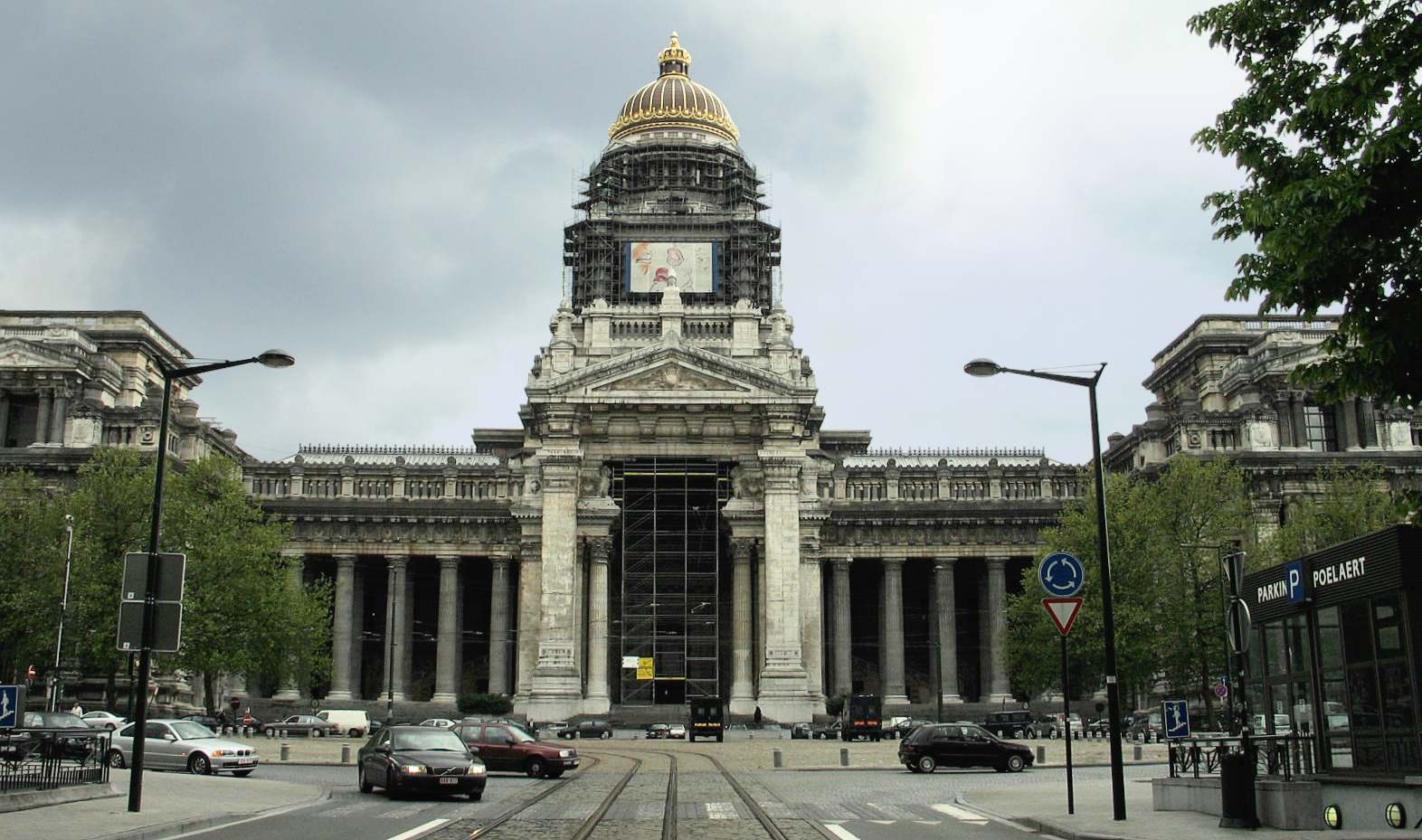
The Law Courts of Brussels

Chapter V, which is titled The Constitutional Court, conflict prevention and resolution, contains the Articles 141 to 143. It is divided into three sections, each of which contains only one article: Section I on the prevention of competency conflicts, Section II on the Constitutional Court and Section III on the prevention and resolution of conflicts of interest. Article 143 determines that the federal State, the Communities, the Regions and the Common Community Commission, in the exercise of their respective competences, must observe the federal loyalty.

Chapter VI, which is titled The judicial power, describes the organisation of the Belgian court system. It contains the Articles 144 to 159. Article 147 establishes the Court of Cassation. Article 150 establishes the jury for all felonies and for political offences and press-related offences. In 1999, this article was amended to include a provision that "press-related offences inspired by racism or xenophobia" are not tried by a jury. Article 151 establishes the High Council of Justice and the manner in which judges are appointed. Article 156 establishes five courts of appeal: one in Brussels, Ghent, Antwerp, Liège and Mons. Article 157 stipulates that military courts can be created in wartime. It also stipulates that there are Commercial Courts, Labour Courts and so-called Penalty Application Tribunals.

Chapter VII, which is titled The Council of State and the administrative jurisdictions, contains the Articles 160 and 161 and establishes the Council of State. It also provides that no administrative jurisdiction can be established except by law.

==== Local government ====
Chapter VIII, the last chapter of Title III of the Constitution, is titled The provincial and municipal institutions. As its title suggests, this chapter describes the organisation of the institutions of the provinces and the municipalities of Belgium. It contains the Articles 162 to 166. Article 162 establishes the principles of the organisation of the provincial and municipal institutions, such as the direct election of the members of the provincial and the municipal councils. Article 163 stipulates that the functions of the provincial organs are exercised in the extraprovincial Brussels-Capital Region by the institutions of the Flemish Community, the French Community, the Common Community Commission and the Region. Article 165 provides that the law can create agglomerations and federations of municipalities. It also describes the functioning of these agglomerations and federations. Article 166 describes how the preceding article applies to the municipalities of the Brussels Region.

== Constitutional amendments ==
The Belgian Constitution can be amended by the federal legislative power, which consists of the King (in practice, the Federal Government) and the Federal Parliament. The amendment process is governed by the provisions of Title VIII of the Constitution, which is titled The revision of the Constitution. In order to amend the Constitution, the federal legislative power must declare that there are reasons to revise the Constitution, in accordance with Article 195 of the Constitution. This is done by means of two so-called Declarations of Revision of the Constitution, one adopted by the Chamber of Representatives and the Senate, and one signed by the King and the Federal Government.

Following this declaration, the Federal Parliament is automatically dissolved and a new federal election must take place. This makes it impossible to amend the Constitution unless an election has intervened. Following the election, the new Federal Parliament can amend those articles that have been declared revisable. Neither Chamber can consider amendments to the Constitution unless at least two-thirds of its members are present and the Constitution can only be amended if at least two-thirds of the votes cast are in favour of the amendment.

There are further restrictions on the power of the Federal Parliament to amend the Constitution. Article 196 of the Constitution provides that the process to amend the Constitution cannot be initiated or continued in times of war or when the Federal Parliament is unable to freely meet in Belgium. Article 197 also provides that the provisions relating to the King's constitutional powers cannot be amended during a regency.

The federal legislative power also has the power to modify the numbers and the subdivisions of the articles of the Constitution, the subdivision of the Constitution into titles, chapters and sections, and the terminology of articles that have not been declared revisable, in order to bring it in agreement with the terminology used in new provisions and to harmonise the Dutch, French and German texts of the Constitution, in accordance with Article 198. Neither Chamber can debate on such modifications unless at least two-thirds of its members are present and the Constitution can only be modified in this manner if at least two-thirds of the votes cast are in the affirmative.

The procedure to change and consolidate the structure of the Belgian Constitution and its subdivisions and articles is called coordination. It has only been used once in Belgian history, in 1993, when it was decided to publish a consolidated version of the entire Constitution in the Belgian Official Journal. A coordinated version was proposed to the Federal Parliament by the Federal Government on 25 June 1993, it was adopted by the Chamber of Representatives on 20 January 1994, and by the Senate on 3 February 1994. This coordinated text of the Belgian Constitution was published in the Belgian Official Journal on 17 February 1994.

The Belgian Constitution has been amended 29 times since the coordinated text of 17 February 1994 was published in the Belgian Official Journal: once in 1996, three times in 1997, four times in 1998, twice in 1999 and in 2000, once in 2001, twice in 2002 and in 2004, and three times in 2005 and in 2007, once in 2008 and five times in 2012. The most recent change to the Constitution took place by revision of article 12 on 24 October 2017.

== See also ==
- Joyous Entry of 1356
- Constitutional law
- Constitutional Court of Belgium
- Constitutional economics
- Constitutionalism
- Rule according to higher law
