= Court of Cassation (Belgium) =

Supreme court of the Belgian judiciary

Court of Cassation of Belgium
- Dutch: Hof van Cassatie van België; French: Cour de Cassation de Belgique; German: Kassationshof von Belgien
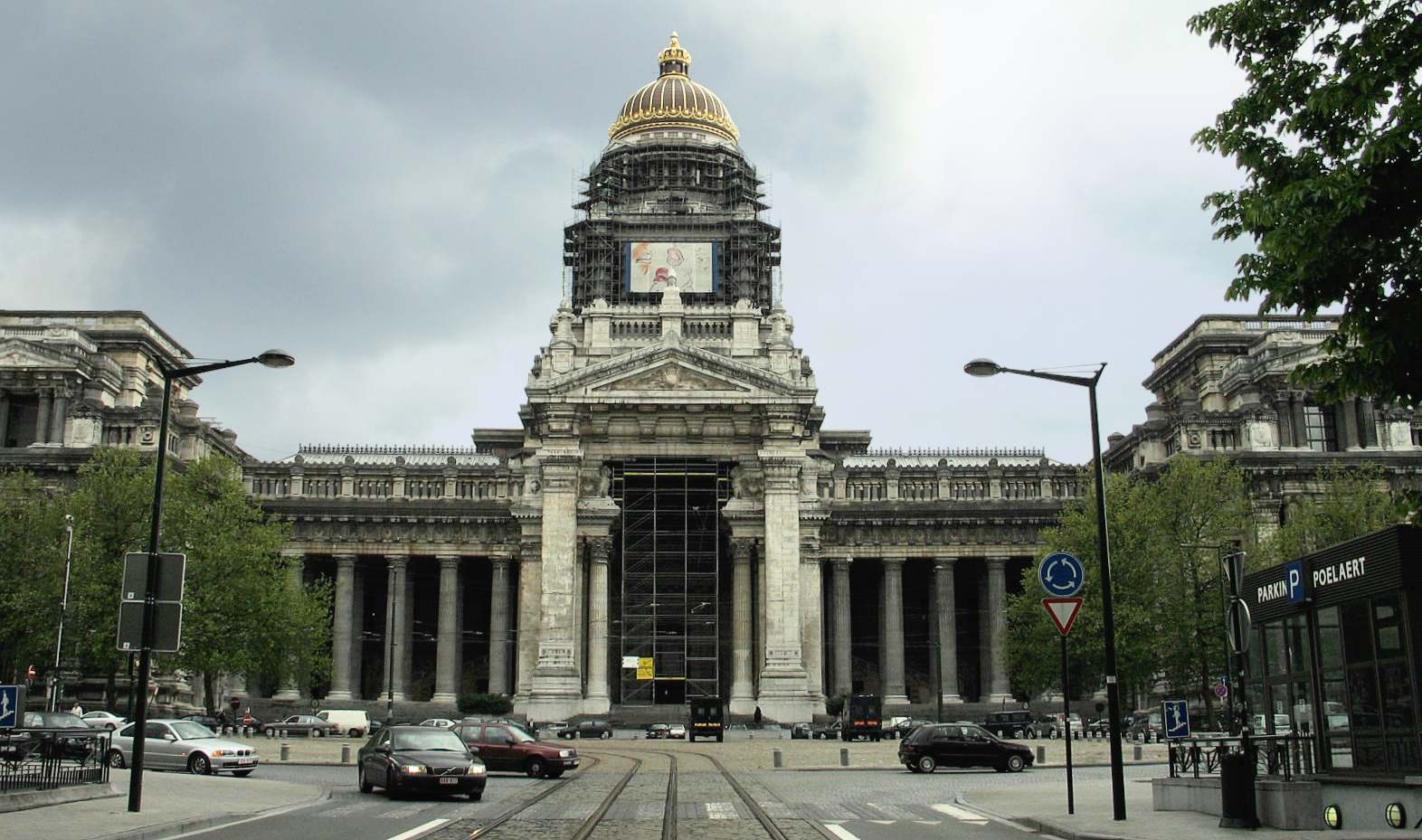
- The Brussels Palace of Justice is the seat of the Court of Cassation
- Interactive map of Court of Cassation of Belgium
- 50°50′12″N 4°21′06″E
- Jurisdiction: Belgium
- Location: Palace of Justice, Brussels
- Coordinates: 50°50′12″N 4°21′06″E
- Authorised by: Constitution of Belgium; Belgian Judicial Code
- Judge term length: Life tenure
- Number of positions: 30
- Website: justitie.belgium.be

First President of the Court of Cassation
- Currently: Beatrijs Deconinck
- Since: 2019
- Lead position ends: 2024

President of the Court of Cassation
- Currently: Ridder Jean De Codt
- Since: 2019
- Lead position ends: 2024

The Court of Cassation (Dutch: Hof van Cassatie [ˌɦɔ(f) fɑn kɑˈsaː(t)si]; French: Cour de cassation [kuʁ də kasɑsjɔ̃]; German: Kassationshof [kasaˈtsi̯oːnsˌhoːf]) of Belgium is the supreme court of the Belgian judiciary. The court is composed of thirty judges with life tenure who are nominated by the High Council of Justice of Belgium and appointed by the Belgian federal government. The court handles cases in the two main languages of Belgium, Dutch and French, and provides certain facilities for cases in German. The court is assisted in its work by a public prosecutor's office and a bar association, which both function separately from other structures. The duty of the public prosecutor's office is to provide advisory opinions to the court on how the law ought to be interpreted and applied. The attorneys of the court's bar association assist litigants in proceedings before the court; in certain cases, their assistance is mandatory.

The Belgian Court of Cassation was originally modelled after its French namesake, and its jurisdiction and powers are still very similar to those of its French counterpart. The court is a court of cassation; meaning that it only hears appeals in last resort against decisions of lower courts and tribunals, and only on points of law. This means the Court of Cassation will not review or reconsider the findings of fact established by the lower court or tribunal. The jurisdiction of the court is limited to either upholding a decision that is contested, or annulling (quashing) it because it violated or misinterpreted the law. The latter is referred to as "cassation". By these means, the court is in effect the supreme interpreter of Belgian law, and as such ensures the nationwide uniform interpretation and application of the law by all other courts and tribunals of the Belgian judiciary.

Generally speaking, the Court of Cassation only exercises supreme jurisdiction over judicial decisions, and thus does not hear appeals against administrative decisions (which is the realm of the Council of State of Belgium). The Court of Cassation also does not rule on the constitutionality of laws, which is the jurisdiction of the Constitutional Court of Belgium. However, some decisions of certain non-judicial bodies are within the purview of the Court of Cassation nonetheless. The court also settles jurisdictional conflicts which may or may not involve an administrative court. Furthermore, the court rules on certain prejudicial questions from other courts and on certain requests to review old criminal cases. Lastly, the court handles certain proceedings against judicial officers (magistrates; which encompasses judges and prosecutors in Belgian legal terminology), including recusal requests against a particular judge or prosecutor, requests to disqualify a judge or entire court, and requests to hold judges or prosecutors civilly liable for respectively judicial misconduct or prosecutorial misconduct. A ruling or judgment of the Court of Cassation is officially called an "arrest" (Dutch: arrest, French: arrêt, German: Entscheid).

An important aspect of the Court of Cassation is that it has no discretionary power to select the cases it hears, which means it must consider all cases correctly brought before it. The only filter that exists is the mandatory intervention of an attorney in certain cases. For this reason, the court handles a fairly large number of cases each year compared to some other supreme courts. For example, the court received about 2,500 petitions to initiate proceedings in 2019. A second aspect is that the court does not make public any individual opinions of its judges; it always issues one single ruling in each case. Lastly, the rulings of the court are only binding for the case at hand, and do not have the value of stare decisis. Lower courts are thus not officially required to adhere to the rulings of the Court of Cassation in earlier cases. However, the Court's rulings still have an important persuasive value for lower courts nonetheless; especially any so-called jurisprudence constante following from the court's case law.

== Court structure ==
=== Judges ===
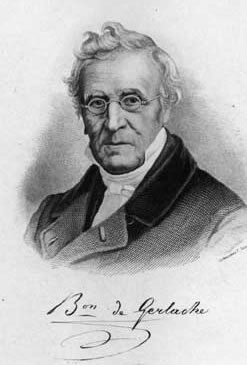
Étienne Constantin, Baron de Gerlache (1785-1871) was appointed as the first-ever first president after the creation of the court.

The Court of Cassation is composed of thirty judges with life tenure (notwithstanding their retirement), who are officially called "counsellors" (Dutch: raadsheren, French: conseillers, German: Gerichtsräte). For the sake of clarity, the term 'judge' will be used in this article. The thirty judges are divided into three chambers with each ten judges. The three chambers are each further divided into two sections, a Dutch one and a French one, each composed of five judges. This means that in principle, half of the court's judges are Dutch-speaking and the other half French-speaking. However, some of the judges are required to master both Dutch and French, so as to facilitate joint hearings and sessions of the court. Each of the judges can serve in any of the chambers and sections given they speak the relevant language. Whilst the court counts thirty positions for judges, temporary vacancies can exist when for example one of the court's judges retires. The judges retire when they reach the statutory retirement age of 70.

To be appointed as judge to the court, candidates must hold the Belgian nationality, must hold a law degree, must have been active in the legal sphere for at least fifteen years, and must have been a judge or prosecutor for at least ten years. Candidates must also meet the language requirements and have a clean criminal record. An opinion on each candidate will be provided to the federal Minister of Justice by the general assembly of the Court of Cassation (see further below), by the head of the court or prosecutor's office where the candidate is currently active, and by the relevant bar association. The minister of Justice will then send all candidacies to the High Council of Justice of Belgium, who will nominate one candidate. The Belgian federal government (officially "the King" as the personification of the executive) will then finally appoint or reject the nominated candidate. (Note: "De werving, selectie, initiële opleiding en loopbaan van magistraten in België en in enkele andere lidstaten van de Europese Unie – diversiteit troef" [The recruitment, selection, initial training and career of magistrates in Belgium and in some other member states of the European Union – diversity all around] (PDF). www.hrj.be (in Dutch). High Council of Justice of Belgium. 27 April 2005. pp. 28–32.)

In each of the six sections, a judge is appointed as "section president" (Dutch: sectievoorzitter, French: président de section, German: Sektionspräsident). Out of the thirty judges, one is also appointed as "first president" (Dutch: eerste voorzitter, French: premier président, German: erster Präsident) and one as "president" (Dutch: voorzitter, French: président, German: Präsident) for the whole Court of Cassation. The overall leadership over the court lies with the first president (the "chief justice"); the president has a deputy position regarding the first president. If the first president belongs to the French-speaking half of the court, the president will be chosen from the Dutch-speaking half and vice versa, so as to preserve the linguistic balance on the court.

As of 2020, the first president of the Court of Cassation is Beatrijs Deconinck (Dutch-speaking) and the president is ridder Jean De Codt (French-speaking). In 2019, Mrs Deconinck became the first female first president in the Court of Cassation's history.

=== Prosecutor's office ===
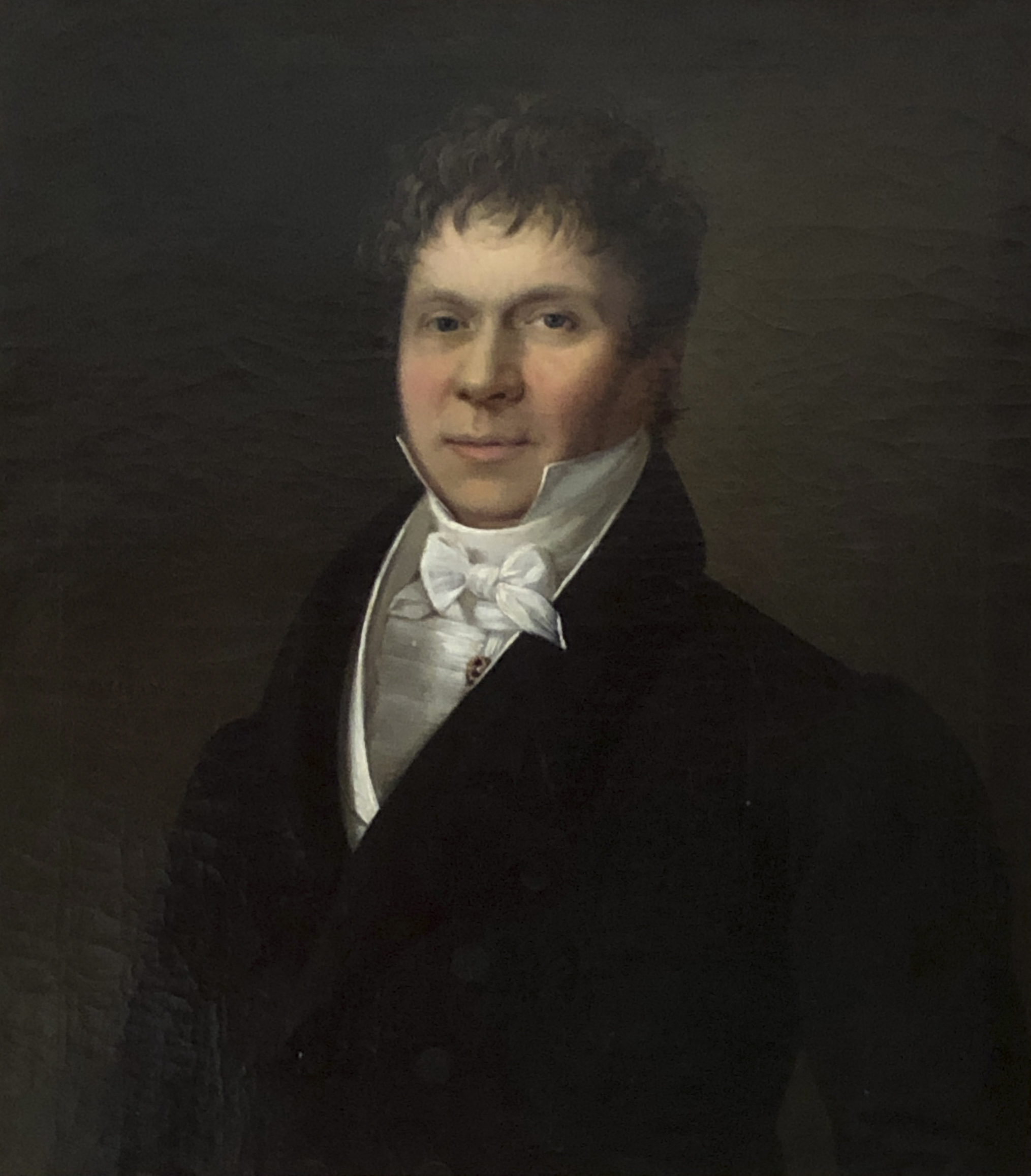
Jean-Louis van Dievoet (1777-1854) was the first secretary to the court's prosecutor's office, after the Kingdom's independence.

There is a public prosecutor's office attached to the Court of Cassation, which is referred to as the prosecutor-general's office (Dutch: parket-generaal, French: parquet général, German: Generalstaatsanwaltschaft). The prosecutor-general's office is led by the prosecutor-general at the Court of Cassation (Dutch: procureur-generaal bij het Hof van Cassatie, French: procureur général près la Cour de Cassation, German: Generalprokurator beim Kassationshof). The prosecutor-general's office furthermore consists of one first advocate-general (Dutch: eerste advocaat-generaal, French: premier avocat général, German: Erster Generalanwalt), who has a deputy position regarding the prosecutor-general, and eleven advocates-general (Dutch: advocaat-generaal, French: avocat général, German: Generalanwalt). The thirteen members of the prosecutor-general's office exercise the duties of the office in all cases brought before the court (see further below). Just like with the first president and president of the court, if the prosecutor-general belongs to the French-speaking members of the office, the first advocate-general will be chosen from the Dutch-speaking members and vice versa, so as to preserve the linguistic balance on the office.

As of 2020, the prosecutor-general at the Court of Cassation is André Henkes (French-speaking) and the first advocate-general is Ria Mortier (Dutch-speaking).

=== Bar ===
The Court of Cassation has its own bar association, consisting of a number of "attorneys at the Court of Cassation" (Dutch: advocaat bij het Hof van Cassatie, French: avocat à la Cour de cassation, German: Rechtsanwalt beim Kassationshof). The number of attorneys at the Court of Cassation is set by the Belgian federal government (currently twenty attorneys). These attorneys, whilst not employed by or part of the court, play an important role in the proceedings before the court nonetheless (see further below). Attorneys wishing to be admitted to the bar at the Court of Cassation, must have been part of another bar association for at least ten years and must pass a specific bar examination. When one of the twenty positions at the bar becomes vacant, the Belgian federal government will appoint a new attorney meeting these criteria to the bar.

The bar association is headed by the president of the bar (Dutch: stafhouder van de balie, French: bâtonnier du barreau, German: Präsident der Rechtsanwaltschaft). As of 2020, Jacqueline Oosterbosch is president of the bar.

=== Auxiliary services ===
Administrative matters related to the judicial duties of the Court of Cassation are handled by the court clerks (Dutch: griffier, French: greffier, German: Greffier) of the clerk's office (Dutch: griffie, French: greffe, German: Kanzlei) of the court. In this capacity, the clerk's office receives petitions and pleadings related to proceedings before the court, keeps the records and notes of the court, and provides the court's rulings to the parties involved.

The Court of Cassation and its prosecutor-general's office also dispose over a number of law clerks called "referendaries" (Dutch: referendaris, French: référendaire, German: Referent). The referendaries assist the judges and the members of the prosecutor's office in preparing their rulings and advisory opinions, maintain documentation related to the court's duties, and work on the translation and publication of the court's rulings.

Lastly, the court also employs a number of attachés, as well as magistrates from other courts or tribunals with a temporary assignment. They work on the translation of the court's rulings, on maintaining documentation, and on certain studies and legal research in the interest of the court.

== Jurisdiction ==
=== Appeals in cassation ===
==== Annulment of court decisions ====
An appeal in cassation (Dutch: voorziening in cassatie, French: pourvoi en cassation, German: Kassationsbeschwerde) to the Court of Cassation is only possible against decisions (judgments, rulings and court orders) from other (lower) courts in the judiciary, against which all ordinary appeal procedures have been exhausted. This usually concerns the judgments and rulings rendered by the courts of appeal and the courts of labour, as well as some judgments and rulings rendered by lower courts in specific or petty cases. The Court of Cassation does not re-examine any findings of fact; it will only rule on questions of law concerning the contested decision. Neither can the court change the content of any contested decision. Its jurisdiction is limited to either upholding a contested decision, rendering it final and irrevocable; or either annulling it ("cassation", from the French verb casser, "to break" or "to quash") if the court finds the decision to violate the law. This is the case if the court finds that the decision misjudged or misinterpreted the law, breached essential procedural requirements or ignored formalities prescribed under penalty of nullity. The court can annul the entire decision or only part of it, which is known as "partial cassation" (Dutch: gedeeltelijke cassatie, French: cassation partielle, German: teilweise Kassation).

If the court annuls (part of) a decision, it will generally remit the case to a different court of the same rank as the one whose decision was annulled. In specific cases, the case will be remitted to the same court though, which will then rehear the case in a different composition however (meaning by different judges as the first time). After annulment by the Court of Cassation, the (annulled part of the) case is always tried de novo, both on questions of fact and on questions of law, by the court to which it has been referred. Any such court is thus not bound by any findings of fact preceding the cassation proceedings. In some specific instances though, the court will not remit the case to any court for a retrial after cassation, namely when there is nothing left to judge on by virtue of the court's ruling. This is known as "cassation without referral" (Dutch: cassatie zonder verwijzing, French: cassation sans renvoi, German: Kassation ohne Verweisung). A cassation without referral can for example occur when the court annuls an arrest warrant because it was issued outside of the statutory time limit.

The principle that the Court of Cassation does not rule on questions of fact, is laid down in Article 147 of the Belgian Constitution.

==== Only judicial decisions ====
Like many other European countries, Belgium has a system of administrative courts which oversee the lawfulness of acts of administrative authorities. The system of administrative courts is distinct from the judiciary, and as such, the jurisdiction of the Court of Cassation regarding annulment does not extend to judgments and rulings rendered by those courts. The jurisdiction of the Court of Cassation is limited to judgments and rulings rendered by judicial courts. However, the exceptions are any jurisdictional conflict between the judicial and administrative courts, as well as rulings from the Belgian Court of Audit and some disciplinary bodies, as explained below.

==== Rulings of the Court of Audit ====
Administrative rulings from the Belgian Court of Audit however do fall under the jurisdiction of the Court of Cassation. The Court of Audit decides by administrative ruling whether the accounts of public accounting officers answerable to the Treasury are in balance or not, and if not whether the balance is in their favour or in the State's favour. If the Court of Audit determines that the account of an accounting officer shows a deficit, the Court of Audit will hold a public hearing with the officer in question. The Court of Audit will subsequently either grant discharge to the accounting officer, or either find the officer at fault and sentence him to fully or partially indemnify the State from his own means. The Court of Cassation hears appeals in cassation against such rulings of the Court of Audit. If the Court of Cassation finds that the ruling violates the law, the court will annul it, and refer the case to a committee formed ad hoc from members of the legislative assembly concerned (for the federal government: the Belgian Chamber of Representatives). This ad hoc committee will then rule on the case without the possibility of any subsequent appeal.

==== Rulings of disciplinary bodies ====
The second kind of non-judicial rulings that nevertheless fall under the jurisdiction of the Court of Cassation are disciplinary rulings by some professional bodies for liberal professions. This concerns rulings in disciplinary cases issued by, amongst others, the Belgian Order of Physicians, the Belgian Order of Pharmacists, the Belgian Order of Veterinarians, the Belgian Order of Architects, the bar associations, the Belgian Institute of Company Auditors, and the Belgian Institute of Accountants and Tax Advisors. This also concerns rulings in disciplinary cases issued by the tribunals of first instance against notaries or court bailiffs. The Court of Cassation hears appeals in cassation against such disciplinary rulings. If the Court of Cassation finds that the ruling violates the law, the court will annul it, and refer the case back to the professional body concerned. If possible, however, the professional body concerned must rehear the case in a different composition (meaning by different members as the first time). The professional body concerned is obliged to adhere to the ruling of the Court of Cassation with regard to the points of law on which it ruled.

=== Jurisdictional conflicts ===
==== Between judicial and administrative courts ====
The Court of Cassation has generally speaking no jurisdiction over judgments and rulings rendered by administrative courts. The Council of State is the supreme court within the Belgian system of administrative courts, which as such handles cassation proceedings against administrative judgments or rulings from lower authorities. However, article 158 of the Belgian Constitution lays down that the Court of Cassation rules on any so-called "conflict of attribution" (Dutch: conflict van attributie, French: conflit d'attribution, German: Kompetenzkonflikt) between administrative and judicial courts. These conflicts of attribution can arise in the following forms:

- Any party to administrative proceedings who believes the Council of State overstepped its administrative jurisdiction in a case, or vice versa believes the Council of State unduly declared it had no jurisdiction because it deemed a case as not administrative in nature, can seek the annulment of any such ruling by the council before the Court of Cassation. If the Court of Cassation annuls the ruling of the Council based on the ground that the Council does have jurisdiction (and unduly declared it did not), the case will referred back to the council. The council will then hear the case again in a different composition (meaning by different judges as the first time) and is required to adhere to the Court of Cassation's ruling regarding its proper jurisdiction.
- A particular case arises when a judicial court and an administrative court both declare they have jurisdiction in a particular case ("positive conflicts"), or vice versa when they both declare themselves incompetent to hear a particular case ("negative conflicts"). The Court of Cassation is competent to settle these matters as well.

By these procedures, the Court of Cassation has the final say over the jurisdictional division between the judicial and administrative courts.

==== Between different judicial courts ====
The Court of Cassation also rules on certain jurisdictional conflicts between different courts or tribunals within the judiciary. Although the particularities differ between criminal and non-criminal cases, these procedures are jointly referred to as "regulation of jurisdiction" (Dutch: regeling van rechtsgebied, French: règlement de juges, German: Bestimmung des zuständigen Gerichts).

In criminal cases, jurisdictional conflicts can arise when two distinct cases concerning the same crime are brought before two different courts ("positive conflicts"). A jurisdictional conflict can also arise when one court or judge (usually in an investigative capacity) refers a criminal case to another court or judge (usually a trial court), but the latter declares itself incompetent to hear the case ("negative conflicts"). If both courts involved in such positive or negative conflicts do not belong to the same territorial jurisdiction, and the matter thus cannot be settled by an appellate court, the Court of Cassation will settle the matter and refer the case to the appropriate court. The applicable procedures for settling such conflicts in criminal cases are laid down in the Belgian Code of Criminal Procedure.

In non-criminal (civil, commercial, ...) cases, jurisdictional conflicts can arise when multiple conflicting judgments have been rendered by multiple courts or judges concerning the same or interrelated lawsuits, on the condition that all ordinary appeal procedures have been exhausted against these judgments. If such is the case, any party to the proceedings may request the Court of Cassation to resolve the conflict. The Court will do so by annulling either judgment and, if there is cause, refer the case to the appropriate court for a retrial. The applicable procedures for settling these conflicts are laid down in the Belgian Judicial Code.

=== Prejudicial questions ===
Under Book IV, Title II, Chapter II (articles IV.86–IV.89) of the Belgian Code of Economic Law, the Court of Cassation must answer any prejudicial question (Dutch: prejudiciële vraag, French: question préjudicielle, German: Vorabentscheidungsfrage) asked by another court concerning a case pending before it. The question must concern the interpretation of any provision of Book IV of the aforementioned code of law (on the topic of competition law). These questions will mostly arise in cases before the Market Court involving a decision of the Belgian Competition Authority (BCA). The federal minister of the Economy of Belgium, the European Commission and the BCA may provide an advisory opinion to the Court as amicus curiae. The Court of Cassation will then issue a preliminary ruling on the question asked, and the requesting court must adhere to the ruling of the Court of Cassation with regard to the points of law on which it ruled.

=== Review of old criminal cases ===
Belgian law provides for two extraordinary procedures through the Court of Cassation to review old criminal cases, in which a final and (in principle) irrevocable conviction has already been rendered, to correct miscarriages of justice. The first procedure is referred to as the "reopening of the procedure" (Dutch: heropening van de rechtspleging, French: réouverture de la procédure, German: Wiederaufnahme des Verfahrens). A request to "reopen the procedure" can be initiated in a particular criminal case when the European Court of Human Rights has ruled that the prosecution undertaken or judgment rendered in that case violated the European Convention on Human Rights. If the alleged violation concerns a judgment from a lower court, the Court of Cassation will annul that judgment if there is cause and either remit the case to a different court of the same rank for a retrial, or otherwise pronounce a cassation without referral. If the alleged violation concerns a ruling of the Court of Cassation itself, the court will examine the request in a different composition (meaning by different judges) as that in which the contested ruling was rendered. If the request is honoured, the court will revoke its earlier ruling and issue a new one, taking into account the decision of the European Court of Human Rights.

The second procedure is referred to as "request for revision" (Dutch: aanvraag tot herziening, French: demande en révision, German: Revisionsantrag). A request for revision can be submitted (notwithstanding some exceptions) when the accused has been sentenced for the same charges by multiple conflicting judgments and the innocence of the accused can be deduced from the conflicting judgments, when one of the witnesses in the case has been convicted for perjury, or when new evidence has come to light that could have led to the accused either being acquitted or being sentenced to a lesser penalty. When the court grants the request in a case of conflicting judgments or perjury, it will annul the contested lower court judgment and remit the case to a different court of the same rank for a retrial. When new evidence has come to light and the court finds that the request is admissible and there is a potential cause for revision, it will refer the case to the 'Commission for revision in penal cases'. This is a commission consisting of five members who are appointed by the federal minister of Justice of Belgium. This commission will further examine the request and provide a non-binding opinion to the Court of Cassation. The court will then either reject the request or grant it; if the request is granted, the contested conviction will be annulled and the case will be referred to the appropriate court for a retrial.

=== Proceedings against judicial officers ===
==== Recusal ====
In any judicial proceedings, any party may request a magistrate (judge or prosecutor) to recuse themself (Dutch: wraking, French: récusation, German: Ablehnung) for a number of causes, such as for an appearance of bias, family ties with any party involved, prior involvement in the case, or a conflict of interest. If a magistrate refuses to recuse themself upon such a request, the court immediately higher in the Belgian judicial hierarchy will decide on the matter. As such, the Court of Cassation will decide on any requests to oblige a magistrate from a court of appeal or a court of labour to recuse themself from a case. Since there is no higher court in the Belgian judicial hierarchy, the Court of Cassation itself will also decide on any request to oblige any of its own magistrates to recuse themselves. The applicable procedures are provided for in the Belgian Judicial Code.

==== Judicial disqualification ====
Belgian law also provides for an extraordinary procedure for judicial disqualification (Dutch: onttrekking aan de rechter, French: dessaisissement du juge, German: Entbindung des Richters), i.e. to remove a case from a judge or entire court, and refer it to another judge or court, through the Court of Cassation. For criminal cases, the applicable procedures are laid down in the Belgian Code of Criminal Procedure; for non-criminal (civil, commercial, ...) cases, these are laid down in the Belgian Judicial Code. A judge or entire court can only be disqualified for a select number of causes, such as for an appearance of bias, or in case a final judgment has not been rendered yet from six months since the proceedings were concluded. The prosecutor-general at the Court of Cassation may also request a judicial disqualification for public security reasons. If the Court of Cassation grants the request, it will indicate the judge or court to which the case will be referred.

==== Liability in case of misconduct ====
Belgian law provides for an extraordinary procedure known as "redress from the judge" (Dutch: verhaal op de rechter, French: prise à partie, German: Richterhaftungsklage) as well. This procedure through the Court of Cassation is meant to hold magistrates (judges or prosecutors) civilly liable in cases of judicial misconduct or prosecutorial misconduct, as established by the law. The applicable procedures to hold magistrates liable are laid down in the Belgian Judicial Code. A judge or prosecutor may be held liable for deceitful acts during an investigation or adjudication, or for other acts for which the law explicitly holds them liable. A judge may also be held liable for "denial of justice" (Dutch: rechtsweigering, French: déni de justice, German: Rechtsverweigerung), when they refuse to adjudicate a case that is correctly brought before them. Prosecutors cannot be held liable for denial of justice because they have the power to exercise prosecutorial discretion. If the court grants a request to hold a magistrate liable, the court will order the magistrate to pay damages to the claimant, and may annul any fraudulent act if there is cause. If the court rejects the request, it may order the claimant to pay damages to the magistrate involved.

==== Disciplinary proceedings ====
Lastly, the Court of Cassation has the power to initiate disciplinary proceedings against its own members and certain members of lower courts. For instance, the first president of the court is responsible for initiating disciplinary proceedings against the other judges of the court, or against the first presidents of the courts of appeal and the courts of labour. The general assembly of the court (see further below) in turn is responsible for initiating disciplinary proceedings against the court's first president. The prosecutor-general at the court can also initiate disciplinary proceedings against all judges of the court, or against the other members of the prosecutor-general's office. The federal minister of Justice of Belgium in turn is responsible for initiating disciplinary proceedings against the prosecutor-general at the court. All the aforementioned only serves to initiate proceedings however, because disciplinary proceedings against magistrates are decided on by non-permanent disciplinary tribunals for the judiciary. These disciplinary tribunals are only assembled once disciplinary proceedings are initiated. They are composed of judges appointed to them for a five-year term. The disciplinary tribunals can decide to apply disciplinary sanctions up to removal from office.

A sole disciplinary power exercised by the Court of Cassation itself is that against members of the Council of State, the Belgian supreme administrative court. The Court of Cassation decides in general assembly (see further below) on disciplinary proceedings, concerning suspension or removal from office, against members of the Council of State.

== Court procedure ==
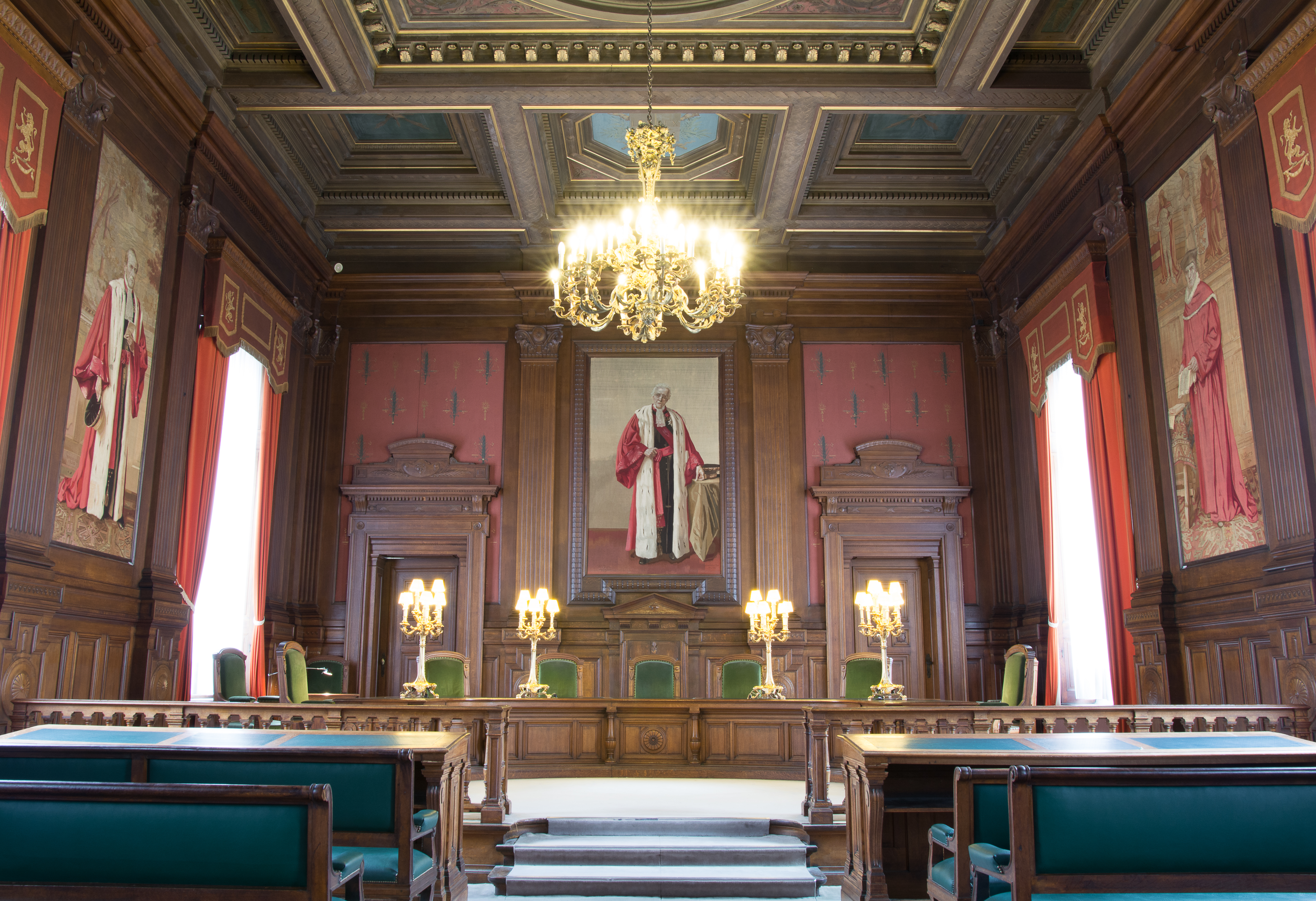
Standard courtroom of the Court of Cassation in the Palace of Justice, Brussels.

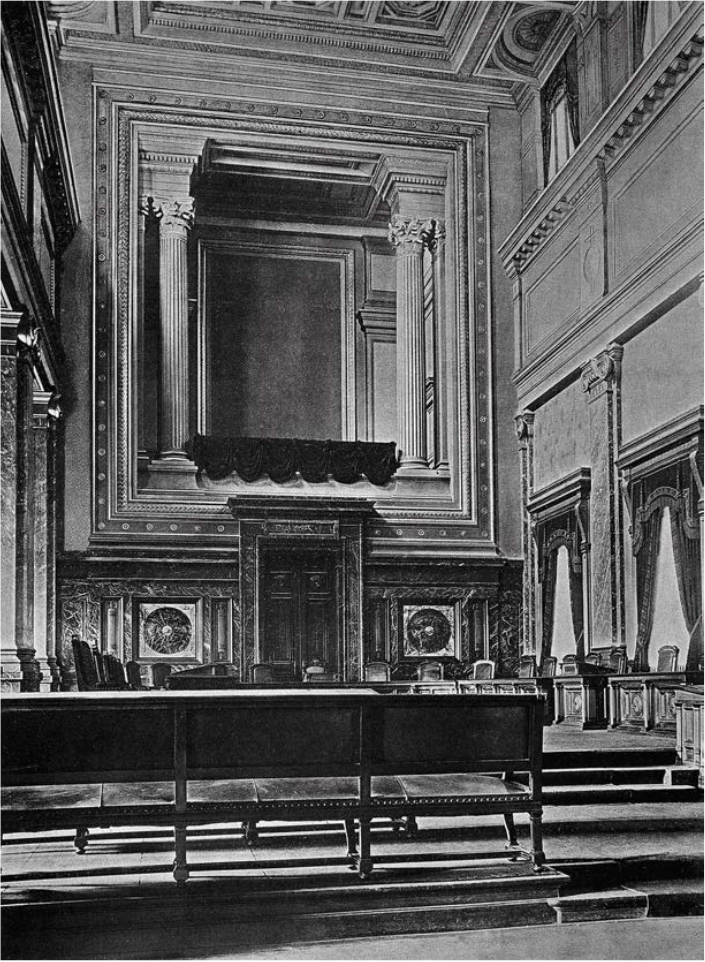
Old image of the court's grand courtroom in the Palace of Justice, Brussels. This stately courtroom is used for sessions too large for the standard courtroom, as well as for certain judicial ceremonies.

=== Role of the prosecutor's office ===
Unlike the public prosecutor's offices attached to other courts, the prosecutor-general's office attached to the Court of Cassation does not engage in any criminal investigations or prosecutions. The prosecutor-general's office functions independently and separately from the rest of the Public Prosecution Service of Belgium. Its function is to provide an advisory opinion to the court regarding the legality and regularity of any contested judgment or ruling, and the manner in which to interpret and apply the law to any case. In this capacity, the prosecutor-general's office intervenes in all cases brought before the court. It is for example possible for the prosecutor-general's office to request the annulment of a criminal conviction, secured by a lower prosecutor's office before a lower court, if it finds the conviction to be based on a misinterpretation of the law or in breach of essential procedural requirements. In some cases, the prosecutor-general's office may initiate cassation proceedings itself "in the name of the law" against certain decisions it finds to violate the law.

=== Role of the bar ===
In all cases, except criminal and fiscal cases, the intervention of an attorney at the Court of Cassation (one of the twenty members of the court's bar association) is mandatory. Any petition to start cassation proceedings in these cases must be signed by an attorney at the court. Other attorneys are therefore required to involve an attorney at the court if they wish to start cassation proceedings. This way, the attorneys at the court fulfill a certain filter function; they are meant to discourage claimants from starting proceedings that will likely be unsuccessful. It is possible though for attorneys at the court to sign a petition "on request" when they think it has little chances of success, to allow a claimant to start proceedings regardless. Attorneys at the court may only draw up and sign a petition, or they may be requested by a claimant to also handle the rest of the cassation proceedings before the court.

In criminal cases, the intervention of an attorney at the court is not mandatory, but since 2015 any petition to start cassation proceedings in criminal cases must be signed by an attorney with a special certificate. This special certificate can be obtained by any attorney who has followed a specific training. In fiscal cases (cases concerning tax law), the intervention of an attorney is required as well, but this attorney does not have to meet any specific requirements. Any attorney may thus initiate cassation proceedings in fiscal cases.

=== Judicial assistance ===
Any party who cannot afford the costs and fees related to cassation proceedings, can submit a request for judicial assistance to the bureau for judicial assistance (Dutch: bureau voor rechtsbijstand, French: bureau d'assistance judiciaire, German: Büro für Gerichtskostenhilfe) of the Court of Cassation. The bureau for judicial assistance is headed by one of the judges of the court, assisted by a clerk. The judge of the bureau will ask the opinion of an advocate-general on all requests. If the request is deemed to be admissible, the judge will also ask the opinion of one of the attorneys at the court regarding the chances of success of any proceedings. Judicial assistance will only be granted if the requester is sufficiently indigent, and if the proceedings have a reasonable chance of success. Judicial assistance consists of the total or partial waiving of court fees and bailiff fees, as well as of attorney's fees for the interventions of an attorney at the court that are mandatory by law.

Judicial assistance is different from legal aid. Legal aid (Dutch: juridische bijstand, French: aide juridique, German: Rechtshilfe) relates to aid and representation by an attorney, at a reduced fee or free of charge, for indigent persons in general. Legal aid can be obtained from sources outside of the Court of Cassation.

=== Kind of hearing ===
==== Three chambers ====
Most cases and matters brought before the Court of Cassation are heard by one of the court's three chambers. The Belgian Judicial Code lays down by which of the three chambers a case ought to be heard, depending on its nature:

- The first chamber hears appeals in cassation against judgments and rulings in civil and commercial cases;
- The second chamber hears appeals in cassation against judgments and rulings in criminal cases;
- The third chamber hears appeals in cassation against judgments and rulings in social (labour and social protection) cases.

Other cases (cases involving fiscal law, administrative law, or disciplinary rulings by some professional bodies) are divided over the chambers by the first president of the court. In practice, most of these cases are heard by the first chamber. The first president may also at any time, whenever the needs of the court require so, refer cases to another chamber than the one before which they normally ought to be heard. Cases are heard by either the Dutch or French section of each chamber depending on the language of the proceedings.

==== Specific hearings and assemblies ====
However, the first president may require cases to be heard in "full bench" or "plenary hearing" (Dutch: voltallige zitting, French: audience plénière, German: Plenarsitzung), upon the opinion of the prosecutor-general's office and the judge-rapporteur. This means that the Dutch and French sections of the chamber will hold a joint session to hear the case. This usually pertains to cases where different interpretations of the law may exist between the two sections of a chamber. In this manner, hearing cases in full bench is meant to promote the uniform interpretation of the law by both sections.

The law also prescribes that some cases must be heard by the court in "joint chambers" or "full court" (Dutch: verenigde kamers, French: chambres réunies, German: vereinigte Kammern). This means that the judges of multiple chambers will hold a joint session to hear the case. The instances for which the law requires such a hearing in joint chambers are fairly uncommon. Cases required to be heard in this manner include jurisdictional conflicts between administrative and judicial courts, and appeals in cassation against a judgment handed down in a criminal case against a minister of the federal government or one of the regional governments of Belgium.

The broadest manner in which the court can convene, is in "general assembly" (Dutch: algemene vergadering, French: assemblée générale, German: Generalversammlung). The court does not convene in general assembly to adjudicate cases; the general assembly only handles certain matters of an internal nature. The prerogatives of the general assembly of the court include, amongst other things: initiating disciplinary proceedings against the first president of the court, appointing the president and section presidents of the court, providing an opinion on candidates for the office of judge at the court to the federal minister of Justice of Belgium, and drawing up the annual report of the court. A sole exception are any disciplinary proceedings against members of the Council of State, on which the Court of Cassation must decide in general assembly.

==== Number of judges ====
The number of judges which must hear cases in the different configurations of the court, is laid down in the Belgian Judicial Code. To prevent deadlocks, cases are always heard by an uneven number of judges. By default, a case is heard by one of the two sections of a chamber, which sits with five judges. If a case is heard in full bench (by both sections of a chamber), the chamber will sit with nine judges. In principle, all judges of the court can sit in hearings in joint chambers, but the number of judges hearing cases in joint chambers must be at least eleven. If the court convenes in general assembly, an absolute majority of its thirty judges must be present to be able to take any decision. If this quorum for a general assembly is not met, the assembly will be adjourned to a later date. If at a later date the quorum is still not met for an adjourned general assembly, the assembly may take decisions without the quorum being met.

However, the first president or the section president may, upon the opinion of the prosecutor-general's office and the judge-rapporteur, order a case to be heard by only three judges of a section of a chamber. Before 2014, this was only permitted if the outcome of the case appeared to be obvious. After a 2014 amendment, the scope of such hearings with a limited number of judges was broadened to all cases where it appeared an answer to important questions of law, in the interest of the uniform interpretation or the evolution of the law, was not needed. This limited panel of judges must decide on the case unanimously. If the three judges cannot reach a unanimous decision, or if one of them requests it, the case must be referred to the full section of the chamber to be heard by five judges.

=== Process of an appeal in cassation ===
==== Petition ====
In criminal cases, a petition to initiate cassation proceedings needs to be submitted to the clerk's office of the court or tribunal that rendered the contested decision. Prison inmates or people who have been institutionalized in a psychiatric facility may also submit their petition to the director of the establishment. The petition will then be transmitted to the clerk's office of the Court of Cassation. In criminal cases, the petition needs to submitted within fifteen days after the contested decision was rendered, save for some exceptions. The petition needs to be signed by an attorney with a special certificate (as explained above). If the petition (also) targets a decision on civil damages to a civil party involved in the criminal proceedings, a writ of the petition also needs to be served to the civil party by a court bailiff. It is a feature of the Belgian judicial system in general, that the courts and tribunals which have jurisdiction over criminal cases, will also decide on any civil damages sought by a victim who is a civil party to the case.

In non-criminal (civil, commercial, ...) cases, the petition needs to be submitted directly to the clerk's office of the Court of Cassation. In these cases, the petition needs to be submitted within three months after the contested decision was rendered, save for some exceptions. The petition also needs to be signed by an attorney at the court except in fiscal cases (as explained above). A writ of the petition needs to be served to the defendant by a court bailiff. (Note: Voet, Stefaan; Gillaerts, Pieter (31 August 2018). Cross border Enforcement of Monetary Claims - Interplay of Brussels I A Regulation and National Rules. National report: Belgium (1st ed.). Maribor: University of Maribor Press. pp. 47–51. doi:10.18690/978-961-286-182-7 (inactive 11 July 2025). ISBN 978-961-286-182-7.)

The petition must be drawn up in the language of the contested decision, which will determine by which section of a chamber the case will be heard. If the contested decision is in German, the claimant can choose to draw up the petition in any of the three languages of Belgium (either Dutch, French or German).

==== Written pleadings ====
In criminal cases, the claimant can submit written pleadings (Dutch: memorie, French: mémoire, German: Schriftsatz) to elaborate on the initial petition. These pleadings must be submitted to the clerk's office at least fifteen days before the hearing is scheduled, and at least two months after the initial petition was submitted. They must also be served to the civil party (if applicable). The civil party can submit written pleadings as a response at least eight days before the hearing is scheduled, and must serve these to the claimant. All of the aforementioned pleadings need to be signed by an attorney with a special certificate (as explained above).

In non-criminal cases, the claimant can submit written pleadings to elaborate on the initial petition, which must be submitted to the clerk's office within fifteen days after the petition was submitted. These pleadings must also be served to the defendant. The defendant can submit written pleadings as a response within three months after the initial petition or pleadings of the claimant have been served to them. If the defendant raises a cause for non-admissibility, the defendant's pleadings also need to be served to the claimant. In that case, the claimant may submit additional pleadings as a reaction within one month, and needs to serve these to the defendant as well. All of the aforementioned pleadings need to be signed by an attorney at the court, except for fiscal cases (as explained above). In exceptional cases, the aforementioned terms may also be shortened by the first president of the court.

==== Preliminary examination ====
After the petition and written pleadings have been submitted, the first president of the court designates one of the judges who will hear the case as judge-rapporteur (Dutch: raadsheer-verslaggever, French: conseiller rapporteur, German: Gerichtsrat-Berichterstatter). The judge-rapporteur will examine the case and prepare a preliminary report. The case will also be presented to the prosecutor-general's office, to be examined by the prosecutor-general or one of the advocates-general. The prosecutor-general or advocate-general will prepare an advisory opinion on the case. If they intend to ex officio raise a cause of non-admissibility in non-criminal cases, they must inform the parties of such before the hearing.

In criminal cases, the section president of the section that would hear the case, can since 2014 summarily rule to reject the appeal in cassation if the prosecutor-general's office also advises as such. This can only be the case if the appeal in cassation is non-admissible; for example if the term limit to submit a petition has been exceeded, if the petition has not been signed by a proper attorney, or if the claimant does not stipulate any irregularity or cause for nullity that could lead to cassation. The section president will issue such a ruling of non-admissibility without a public hearing and without considering any arguments from the claimant. The claimant involved will be informed of such a ruling and be provided with brief reasons for the rejection. There is no recourse against such a ruling.

==== Hearing and ruling ====
After the preliminary examination and if the case was not ruled inadmissible (only criminal cases), the court will hold a public hearing on the scheduled day where all the required judges are present. The parties involved are not required to be present but can be if they wish so. First, the preliminary report will be presented by the judge-rapporteur; then the prosecutor-general or advocate-general may give his advisory opinion orally. This advisory opinion may also be given in writing in addition. In general, the parties involved do not present any oral arguments at the hearing, as their arguments already have been submitted in writing prior to the hearing. If present, however, the attorneys at the court are permitted to bring oral arguments forward in response to the opinion of the prosecutor-general or advocate-general. After these pleas, the judges will retreat and deliberate. During the hearing, the judges are assisted by a clerk.

If the Court of Cassation deems it necessary, it will request a preliminary ruling from the European Court of Justice or the Benelux Court of Justice regarding the interpretation of respectively European Union law or Benelux law. The Court of Cassation may also request the Belgian Constitutional Court to rule on the constitutionality of a law or legal provision with regard to the Belgian Constitution, if such is questioned in a case before it. The Court of Cassation will stay the case before it until the European Court of Justice, the Benelux Court of Justice or the Constitutional Court has issued the requested ruling.

The judges usually decide on their ruling the same day or shortly after the hearing. The rulings decided on by the judges are pronounced in open court by the section president, in the presence of the prosecutor-general or advocate-general. The parties involved are not required to be present but can be if they wish so. In its ruling, the court will only answer to the arguments brought forward or questions of law raised by the parties involved. If no arguments are brought forward as to why the contested decision needs to be annulled, the court will declare the case to be non-admissible and dismiss it. In criminal cases however, the court will also verify ex officio whether the contested decision was issued in a regular manner and respected the formalities prescribed under penalty of nullity. The court will thus either rule the case to be non-admissible and dismiss it; either reject the appeal in cassation; or either annul the contested decision partially or wholly (cassation), in which case it will either remit the case to the appropriate court for a retrial or either pronounce a cassation without referral (as explained above).

== Aspects of the rulings of the Court of Cassation ==
=== No case selection ===
The Court of Cassation does not have discretionary power to select the cases it hears. There is no writ of certiorari or other prior approval required to initiate a case before the court. As such, the Court of Cassation is required to hear all appeals in cassation that are correctly brought before it. However, the mandatory intervention of an attorney at the court in all non-criminal and non-fiscal cases, and the mandatory intervention of an attorney with a special certificate in criminal cases, is meant to discourage people from initiating frivolous and ill-considered proceedings nonetheless. The aforementioned attorneys form a kind of extrajudicial filter to help reduce the court's caseload.

As described in other parts of this article, additional measures to reduce the caseload of the court have been introduced over the last years as well. This for example concerns:

- The possibility to have simple cases heard by a limited panel of only three judges (since 2014);
- The possibility for the section president to summarily dismiss non-admissible criminal cases (since 2014);
- The abolishment of "double cassation", where a ruling of the court was only binding for a lower court after a second cassation on the same grounds, in favour of the court's rulings being immediately binding for a lower court (since 2017).

=== No individual opinions ===
The court always issues one single ruling on a case before it, which represents the (majority) opinion of the court. The Court does not have a tradition of dissenting opinions or concurring opinions since the deliberations of the judges are in principle secret. The individual opinions of the judges regarding the Court's rulings are thus not publicly known. Moreover, the Court of Cassation has ruled that any violation of the secrecy of deliberations of judges can be punished under article 458 of the Belgian Penal Code, which penalizes violations of professional secrecy requirements.

=== No binding case law ===
By virtue of Article 6 of the Belgian Judicial Code, no Belgian court may issue a ruling that amounts to a generally binding rule, as that is considered the purview of the legislative power. As a consequence, the rulings of the Court of Cassation only ever apply to the case at hand, and do not have the value of stare decisis. This means that the court's rulings are not formally binding for lower courts in a general sense, and thus do not create case law in an official sense. However, the court's rulings have an important persuasive value for lower courts, since the court is likely to annul any lower court judgment conflicting with one of its earlier rulings. The most persuasive form of precedent by the court is the jurisprudence constante, which follows from a series of rulings in which a particular principle or rule was applied in a likewise manner by the court. Although the court itself aims to adhere to its own precedents, peculiar and extraordinary circumstances may nonetheless compel the court to depart from its prior precedents. This way, the court ensures the evolution of the law in conjunction with the evolution of the rest of society.

This principle does not apply to a court to which the Court of Cassation has referred a case for retrial after a judgment was annulled. After a 2017 amendment, Article 1110 of the Belgian Judicial Code and Article 435 of the Belgian Code of Criminal Procedure oblige any such court to adhere to the ruling of the Court of Cassation with regard to the points of law on which it ruled. Before 2017, any court retrying a case referred to it by the Court of Cassation was not formally bound by the court's ruling. This could result in the judgment following the retrial being appealed to the court again. In this event, the case was to be heard by the court in joint chambers. If the court would then annul the judgment again on the same grounds as the first time, the case would again be remitted to a different court for a retrial. Only this time, the court in question would be bound by the ruling of the Court of Cassation with regard to the points of law on which it ruled.

=== No constitutional review ===
The Belgian Constitution, at its adoption in 1831, did not contain any provision either allowing or either prohibiting the Belgian judiciary to engage in the constitutional review of legislative acts. In a ruling rendered on 23 July 1849, the Court of Cassation ruled for the first time on the topic that the Belgian judiciary, including the court itself, cannot review the constitutionality of legislative acts. The court considered that reviewing or considering the constitutionality of legislative acts is the sovereign purview of the legislature. The court has since not deviated from this point of view, and has reaffirmed it in a number of subsequent rulings. The court has however tested the limits of this legal doctrine in for example its "Waleffe" ruling (see further below).

In the 1980s, the Constitutional Court of Belgium (originally named as "Court of Arbitration") was founded as a result of the federalisation of Belgium. This court has since been awarded the power to review the constitutionality of legislative acts with regard to the division of powers over the federal and regional levels of government, and with regard to constitutional rights. Since then, all courts and tribunals of the Belgian judiciary (including the Court of Cassation), whilst still not reviewing the constitutionality of legislative acts themselves, can ask prejudicial questions to the Constitutional Court. If as a result the Constitutional Court nullifies an unconstitutional legislative act or legislative provision, the requesting court will leave aside the nullified act or provision.

== Notable rulings of the Court of Cassation ==
- "Flandria" ruling: In this ruling rendered on 5 November 1920, the court stated that the Belgian State could be held liable for a tort like any other private individual, based on article 1382 of the Belgian Civil Code. The ruling was rendered in a case concerning a badly constructed public road that had caused damage to an adjacent property. The ruling ended the previously presumed sovereign immunity from civil liability of the Belgian State.
- "Waleffe" ruling: In this ruling rendered on 20 April 1950, the court established the presumption of constitutionality. According to this legal doctrine laid down by the court, whenever confronted with an ambiguous legislative act that could be interpreted in both a manner that would violate the Belgian Constitution and in a manner that would be in conformity with the Belgian Constitution, Belgian judges must assume the legislature did not intend to violate the Constitution and must thus choose the interpretation that is in conformity with the Constitution.
- "Franco-Suisse Le Ski" ruling: In this ruling rendered on 27 May 1971, the court confirmed the primacy of self-executing international treaties over domestic laws in case of conflicts between both; and more specifically the primacy of European Union law over any domestic law. This principle, espousing a monistic approach, even stands when the conflicting domestic law was adopted after the treaty entered into force. The cause for the ruling was a tax dispute involving the Belgian cheese company Franco-Suisse Le Ski, which stemmed from import tariffs on dairy products that had been recently approved by Belgian authorities but were later found to be in violation of the EEC Treaty.
- "Spaghetti" ruling: In this ruling rendered on 14 October 1996, the court disqualified the investigative judge Jean-Marc Connerotte from the Dutroux case for allegations of bias, because he had attended fundraising dinner for the victims in the case where he also received a small gift. The disqualification and subsequent replacement of the investigative judge in the extremely sensitive Dutroux case caused national outcry, and was one of the main factors leading up to the so-called "White March". This was a demonstration in Brussels of about 300,000 people who demanded better protection for children and a better functioning justice system.
- "Antigone" ruling: In this ruling rendered on 14 October 2003, the court reduced the scope of the exclusionary principle regarding unlawfully obtained evidence in criminal cases. Until then, the Belgian judiciary had generally adhered to the principle that unlawfully obtained evidence is inadmissible and must be excluded from the criminal proceedings and the consideration of the judge(s), even though such a remedy was not explicitly provided for in Belgian law. The Court of Cassation ruled that unlawfully obtained evidence must only be excluded if its reliability was affected, if the use of the evidence would be an explicit cause of nullity as provided for by law, or if the use of the evidence would be in violation of the right to a fair trial. The cause for the ruling was the conviction of a man for illegally possessing a firearm, which was discovered during a police search later held to be unlawful. The police search was part of a coordinated police operation in the city of Antwerp under the code name "Antigone". This important case law was later codified as such into the "Preliminary title" of the Belgian Code of Criminal Procedure.

== Applicable legislation ==
Most of the legal provisions that establish the structure, jurisdiction and procedure of the Court of Cassation, can be found in the Belgian Judicial Code:

- Part II, Book I, Title I, Chapter V of the Code defines the structure and subdivisions of the court;
- Part III, Title I, Chapter V of the Code defines the jurisdiction of the court;
- Part IV, Book III, Title IV of the Code defines the procedural rules for cassation proceedings in non-criminal (civil, commercial, ...) cases.
- Part IV, Book III, Title IVbis of the Code defines some specific rules for cassation proceedings in disciplinary cases.

However, the Belgian Code of Criminal Procedure defines the procedural rules for cassation proceedings in criminal cases.

The provisions regarding prejudicial questions to the Court of Cassation on the topic of competition law, are laid down in the Belgian Code of Economic Law.

== Statistics ==
=== Caseload ===
According to its annual report, a total of 2,522 new cases were brought before the Court of Cassation in 2019, of which 1,386 were cases in the Dutch language and 1,136 were in the French language. The number of cases still pending at the end of 2019 stood at 2,008. In 2019, the court also issued 2,420 final decisions in cases pending before it, which were therefore closed (as far as concerns the Court of Cassation at least). When looking at the preceding years, one can observe that the number of new cases in 2019 has risen slightly compared to 2018, but is still significantly lower than in 2011 (3,583 new cases). The number of rulings issued in 2019 however stands at the lowest in recent years. In its report, the court itself attributes this to shortages in support personnel, the resignation of seven magistrates (judges and members of the prosecutor's office) from the court, and the burdensome appointment procedure to replace them.

Caseload of the Court of Cassation of Belgium

=== Nature of the cases ===
The court's 2019 annual report also contains statistics about the nature of the cases brought before it. Of the 2,522 new cases brought before the court in 2019, 1,348 were criminal cases, 658 were civil and commercial cases, 170 were fiscal cases, 92 were social cases (involving labour or social protection law), 16 were disciplinary cases (concerning decisions taken by some professional bodies), and 238 cases were requests for judicial assistance in proceedings before the court. Of the aforementioned cases:

- 12 concerned requests to disqualify a judge or court in a lower court case, and refer the case to a different judge or court, that were granted by the court;
- 2 concerned matters that were heard and ruled upon by a chamber of the court in full bench;
- 2 concerned matters that were heard and ruled upon by the court in joint chambers.

In 2019, no prejudicial questions had been asked to the Court of Cassation.

Nature of the cases brought before the Court of Cassation of Belgium (2019)

=== Outcome of the cases ===
The court's 2019 annual reports provides (rounded-up) statistics on the outcome of adjudicated cases as well. Of all the cases the court ruled on in 2019, 54% resulted in the rejection of the appeal in cassation and 22% resulted in a cassation (meaning an entire or partial annulment of the contested judgment or ruling). In addition, 11% of the cases resulted in a summary ruling of non-admissibility (only criminal cases), 6% of the cases concerned the rejection of a request for judicial assistance, 3% concerned the granting of judicial assistance, 3% of the cases were abandoned by the claimant before a final decision, and 1% concerned the disqualification of a judge in a lower court case. There exists a non-negligible difference between criminal and non-criminal cases regarding the chances of success of an appeal in cassation: whilst 41% of the non-criminal cases resulted in a cassation, only 14% of the criminal cases resulted in a cassation as well.

Outcome of the cases ruled upon by the Court of Cassation of Belgium (2019)

== Trivia ==
- At the beginning of each "judicial year" (Dutch: gerechtelijk jaar, French: année judiciaire, German: Gerichtsjahr) on the 1st of September, the Court of Cassation holds a ceremonial session with all of the magistrates (judges and prosecutors) of the court, where the prosecutor-general will hold an oration, usually on a legal topic. This oration is known as a "mercurial" (Dutch: openingsrede, French: mercuriale, German: Eröffnungsrede). During the ceremony, the magistrates wear their ceremonial attire.
- The ceremonial attire of the magistrates of the Court consists of a red court dress and white jabot. In addition, the ceremonial dresses of the first president of the Court and of the prosecutor-general are lined with ermine. The magistrates may wear any decorations or medals awarded to them on their court dresses. These dresses are only worn on ceremonial occasions; during normal hearings the judges and prosecutors wear a simple black court dress with white jabot and red girdle. Both their ceremonial and usual court attire are prescribed by the law.
- Each year in October, the prosecutor-general at the court must submit a report to the Belgian Federal Parliament, listing all of the laws or legal provisions that caused problems during the last judicial year. This concerns laws and legal provisions that turned out to be difficult to interpret or apply by the courts and tribunals of Belgium. This report is meant to allow legislators to correct or improve defective, ambiguous or otherwise problematic legislation.
- Most rulings of the Court of Cassation, as well as some of the advisory opinions given by the prosecutor-general's office, are bundled and published yearly as a reference work. The Dutch-language rulings are published in the Arresten van het Hof van Cassatie, the French-language rulings in the Pasicrisie belge.
- The Court of Cassation of Belgium is a member of the Association des hautes juridictions de cassation des pays ayant en partage l'usage du français (abbreviated as AHJUCAF), which is an organisation founded in 2001 that encompasses around fifty supreme courts from primarily or partially French-speaking nations. The organisation aims to promote the cooperation and the exchange of ideas between the participating supreme courts.

== See also ==
- Court of cassation (general article)
- Council of State (Belgium)
- Constitutional Court (Belgium)

== Literature ==
- Van Eeckhoutte, Willy; Ghysels, Jan (2014). Cassatie in strafzaken [Cassation in penal cases] (in Dutch). Mortsel: Intersentia. ISBN 978-94-000-0462-7.
- Maes, Bruno & Wouters, Paul (eds.); De Codt, Jean (2016). Procederen voor het Hof van Cassatie – Procéder devant la Cour de cassation [Litigating before the Court of Cassation] (in Dutch and French). Antwerp: Knopspublishing. ISBN 978-94-603-5453-3.
- Parmentier, Claude (2018). Comprendre la technique de cassation [Understanding the technique of cassation] (in French) (2nd ed.). Brussels: Larcier. ISBN 978-28-079-0043-1.
- Baudoncq, Frederiek (2018). Voorziening in cassatie [Appeal in cassation] (in Dutch). Mechelen: Wolters Kluwer. ISBN 978-90-465-9599-2.
