= Senate (Belgium) =

Upper house of the Belgian Federal Parliament

Coordinates: 50°50′48″N 4°21′53″E

(in official languages)
German	der Senat
French	le Sénat
Dutch	de Senaat

Type
- Type: Upper house

Leadership
- President: Vincent Blondel, LE since 3 February 2025

Structure
- Seats: 60 (10 of which are co-opted senators)
- Political groups: Government (34): N-VA (10); MR (9); MR (8); ProDG (1) (Note: Liesa Scholzen (of ProDG) is a senator appointed by the German-speaking Community. The party forms a technical group with MR in the senate, and is included within it for the graphic.); LE (5); CD&V (5); Vooruit (5); Opposition (26): VB (8); PS (6); PVDA-PTB (6); Anders (3); Ecolo-Groen (3); Groen (2); Ecolo (1)
- Length of term: 5 years

Elections
- Voting system: Indirect election
- Last election: 9 June 2024
- Next election: On or before 2029

Meeting place
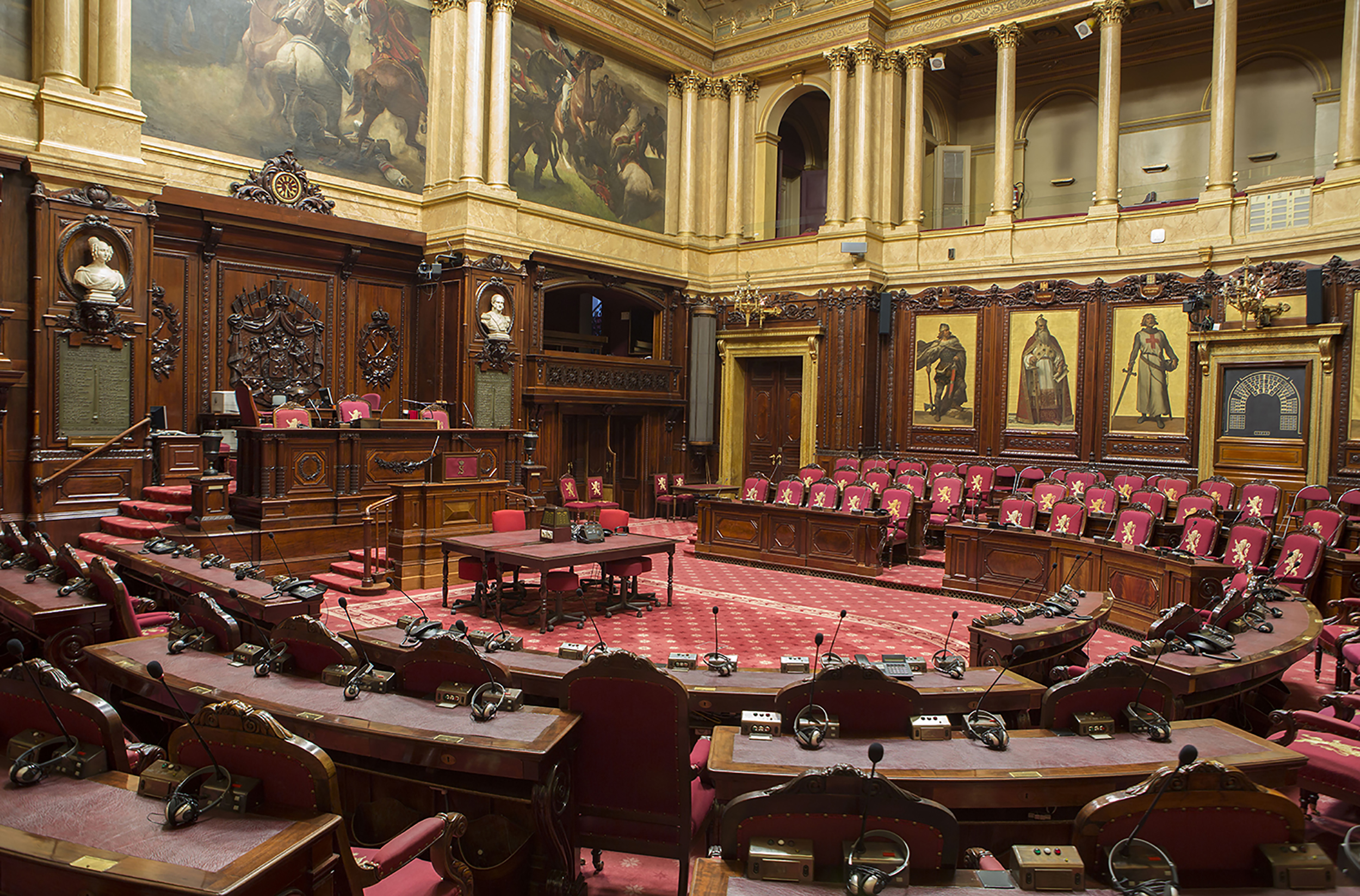
- senate of belgium

Website
- senate.be

The Senate (Dutch: Senaat [səˈnaːt]; French: Sénat [sena]; German: Senat [zeˈnaːt]) is one of the two chambers of the bicameral Federal Parliament of Belgium, the other being the Chamber of Representatives. It is considered to be the "upper house" of the Federal Parliament.

Created in 1831 as a chamber fully equal to the Chamber of Representatives, the Senate has undergone several reforms in the past, most notably in 1993 and 2014. The 2014 elections were the first without a direct election of senators. Instead, the new Senate is composed of members of community and regional parliaments and co-opted members. It is a chamber of the communities and regions and serves as a platform for discussion and reflection about matters between these federated entities. The Senate today plays a minor role in the federal legislative process. However, the Senate, together with the Chamber, has full competence for the Constitution and legislation on the organization and functioning of the federal state and the federated entities. Since the reform of 2014, it holds about ten plenary sessions a year.

== History ==
After the Belgian Revolution of 1830, the National Congress decided on the Belgian Constitution and the state structure. Belgium would become a unitary state. A bicameral Parliament was chosen over a unicameral one. The Senate was seen as a more conservative and elite body that served as a counterweight to the more progressive Chamber of representatives. Senators were directly elected, but only those who paid ground taxes were eligible. Only men who paid taxes were allowed to vote. There was also the possibility for the heir to the throne to become senator by right.

In 1893 the principal of universal multiple voting right was introduced for men. This was combined with the principle of compulsory voting and the principle of proportional representation. For the Senate, candidates still needed to pay ground taxes, but the threshold was lowered. Moreover, a new category of provincial senators was introduced.

After World War I, the single vote system - "one man, one vote" - was introduced. This principle of universal suffrage was only applicable to men, women had no right to vote. They however could be a candidate in elections.

1921 saw a new reform for the Senate. The prerequisite of taxes was abolished and 4 categories of senators were created: directly elected senators, provincial senators, co-opted senators and senators by right.

In 1936, Maria Baers and Odile Maréchal became the first women senators. After World War II, women received the same rights as men as far as voting was concerned.

The post-World War era saw a series of six Belgian state reforms from 1970 until 2014. In 1993, the competences of the Senate were redefined during the fourth State Reform. In 2014, during the sixth State Reform, the Senate transformed in the assembly it is today, with important reforms concerning composition and competences.

== Composition ==
=== Overview ===
	1831–1892	1894–1898	1900–1919	1921–1991	1995–2010	since 2014
Senators directly elected by the voters	51 (1831) – 101 (1946) – 106 (from 1949 to 1991) (half the number of members of the Chamber of representatives, which number was determined by the population figure until 1949)				40 (25 NL + 15 FR)	—
Electoral districts	38 electoral arrondissements (two-round majority system)		21 electoral arrondissements (proportional representation)		1 Dutch + 1 French electoral college (proportional representation)	—
Senators elected by the provincial councils	—	26 (1894) – 27 (1919) (depending on provinces' populations)		40 (1921) – 52 (1991) (depending on provinces' populations)	—	
Senators co-opted by the other senators	—			20 (1921) – 26 (1991) (half the number of provincial senators)	10 (6 NL + 4 FR)	
Senators elected by the community/regional parliaments	—				21 (10 NL + 10 FR + 1 DE)	50 (29 NL + 20 FR + 1 DE)
Total number of senators * plus senators by right, if any	51–76 *	102–120 *		153–184 *	71 *	60

=== Current categories of senators ===
Since the sixth state reform of 2014, the Senate consists of 60 members. 50 are elected by the parliaments of the federated entities, and 10 are co-opted members.

==== Senators of the federated entities ====
Starting with the elections of 25 May 2014, 50 senators are appointed by and from the parliaments of the federated entities:

- 29 senators appointed by the Flemish Parliament from the Flemish Parliament or from the Dutch language group of the Parliament of the Brussels-Capital Region
- 10 senators appointed by and from the Parliament of the French Community (which itself is composed of all members of the Parliament of Wallonia and several members of the French language group of the Parliament of the Brussels-Capital Region)
- 8 senators appointed by and from the Parliament of Wallonia
- 2 senators appointed by and from the French-language group of the Parliament of the Brussels-Capital Region
- 1 senator appointed by and from the Parliament of the German-speaking Community

Whereas the German-speaking senator is chosen by plurality of votes in the Parliament of the German-speaking community, the seats of the senators of the federated entities are distributed proportionally between parties based on the results for the latest election for the federated entities, i.e. the Flemish Parliament, the Parliament of Wallonia and the Parliament of the Brussels-Capital Region (regional level).

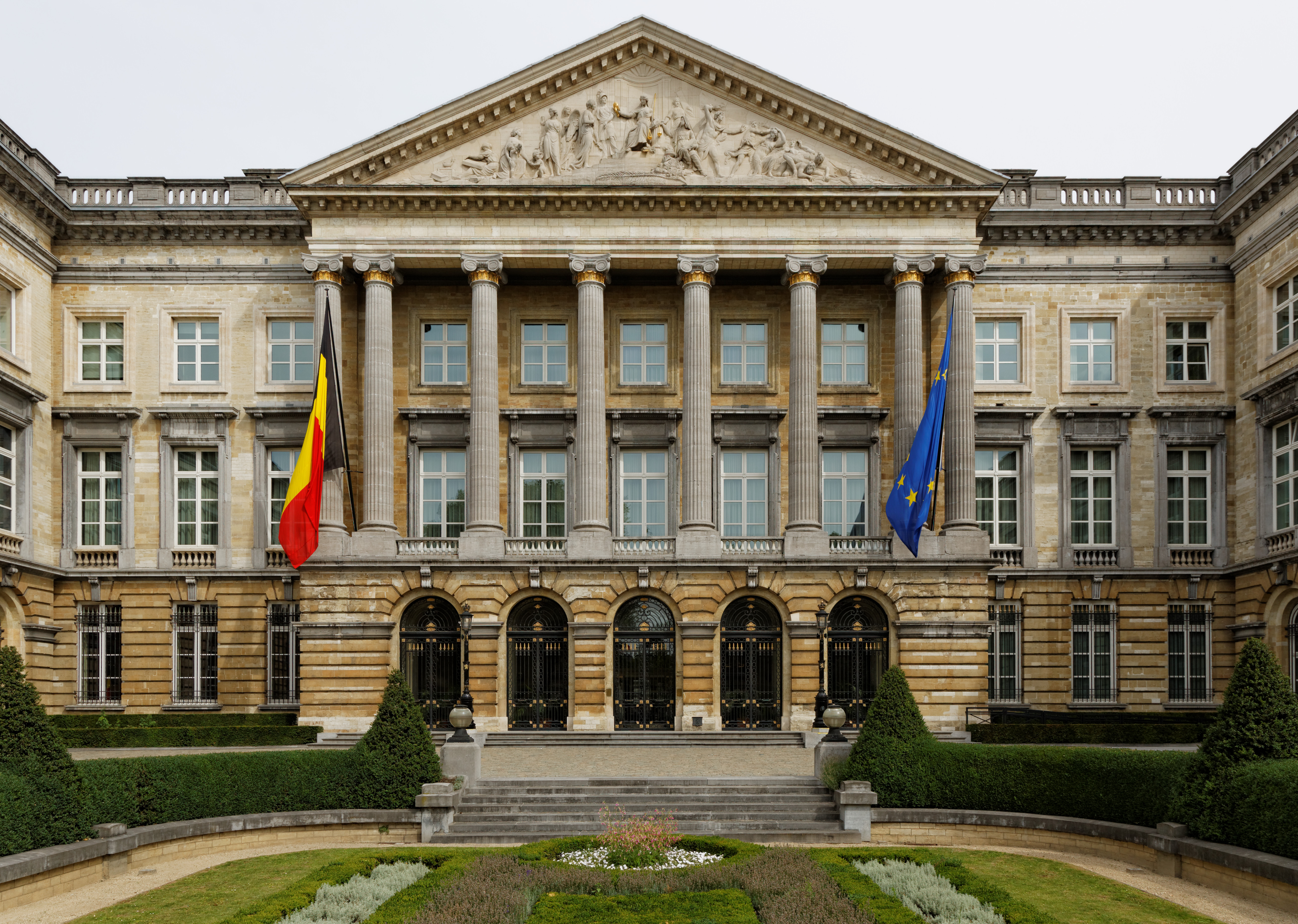
The Palace of the Nation in Brussels, home to both Chambers of the Federal Parliament of Belgium

==== Co-opted senators ====
Ten senators are co-opted, meaning they are elected by their peers: six by the Dutch-language group of the Senate and four by the French-language group of the Senate. These seats are distributed proportionally between parties based on the results of the latest direct election of the Chamber of Representatives (federal level).

In 1921, the co-opted members were included in the Constitution as a new category of senators. It was intended to allow the senators to elect a number of experts or members of representative organizations to join them to enhance the quality of debate and legislation; however, political parties sometimes use it as a means of rewarding loyal members that were not elected.

=== Former categories of senators ===
Prior to the Belgian federal election of May 21, 1995, there were 184 senators, the largest part of which were directly elected, some appointed by the Provincial Councils and others co-opted.

The fourth state reform, which took place in 1993, revised the Belgian Constitution, reduced the number of senators to 71. The change took effect following the May 21, 1995, federal election.

==== Directly elected senators ====
Until the elections of 25 May 2014, the Senate contained 40 directly elected members. To elect these members, the electorate was divided into two electoral colleges: a Dutch and a French electoral college. Unlike for European Parliament elections, there was no German-speaking electoral college. Instead, the members of the German-speaking Community were a part of the French electoral college. Even though there were two electoral colleges, there were three constituencies for Senate elections: a Flemish constituency, a Walloon constituency and the constituency of Brussels-Halle-Vilvoorde, which comprised the Brussels-Capital Region and the surrounding part of the Flemish Region. The constituency of Brussels-Halle-Vilvoorde ceased to exist following the 2014 sixth State Reform.

The voters in the Flemish constituency belonged to the Dutch electoral college and the voters in the Walloon constituency (which also includes the people living in the German-speaking Community) belonged to the French electoral college, whereas the voters in Brussels-Halle-Vilvoorde could choose for which electoral college they wanted to vote: they had the lists of both electoral colleges on one ballot. In each electoral college, the seats were divided by proportional representation, using the D'Hondt method.

Of the total of 40 directly elected senators, 25 were elected by the Dutch electoral college and 15 by the French electoral college. These numbers were in the Belgian Constitution and roughly reflect the ratio of Dutch-speakers to French-speakers by population. The directly elected senators were always elected on the same day as the members of the Chamber of Representatives, for a term of 4 years, except if the Chambers were dissolved earlier. The last federal election that had directly elected senators took place on Sunday June 13, 2010.

==== Provincial senators ====
Between 1894 and 1991, a number of senators were elected by each provincial council of the nine provinces. The number was dependent on a province's population, and increased along with the increase in a province's population.

==== Senators by right ====
Before the sixth state reform, the children of the King, older than 18, or if there were none, the Belgian descendants of the main branch of the royal house, were entitled to be senators by right by taking the oath of office. Senators by right over the age of 21 were in theory entitled to vote, but in practice they did not cast their vote. They were not taken into account for the required quorum for voting.

Until Prince Philippe became King in July 2013, there were three senators by right (Prince Philippe, Princess Astrid and Prince Laurent). When the function of senators by right was abolished in 2014 as part of the sixth state reform, there were no senators by right, as King Philippe's children were all under the age of 18.

== Qualifications ==
Article 69 of the Belgian Constitution sets forth four qualifications for senators: each senator must be at least 18 years old, must possess the Belgian nationality, must have the full enjoyment of civil and political rights, and must be resident in Belgium. Originally, the minimum age to be elected senator was 40; this was reduced to 21 in 1993 and eventually to 18 in 2014. A senator can only enter into office after having taken the constitutional oath, in either of the three official languages in Belgium: Dutch, French or German. They may also choose to take the oath in more than one language. The oath is as follows: "I swear to observe the Constitution". (Dutch: Ik zweer de Grondwet na te leven, French: Je jure d'observer la Constitution, German: Ich schwöre, die Verfassung zu befolgen)

Certain offices are incompatible with the office of senator. A member of the Senate may not be a member of the Chamber of Representatives at the same time and representatives must give up their seats in the Chamber of Representatives in order to join the Senate.

Another important incompatibility is based on the separation of powers. A senator who is appointed as a minister ceases to sit in the Senate and is replaced for as long as he is a minister. However, if he resigns as a minister, he may return to the Senate, in accordance with Article 50 of the Belgian Constitution. A senator cannot also be a civil servant or a member of the judiciary at the same time. However, a civil servant who is elected to the Senate is entitled to political leave and does not have to resign as a civil servant. It is also not possible to be a member of the Federal Parliament and a Member of the European Parliament at the same time.

== Language groups ==
With the exception of the senator appointed by the Parliament of the German-speaking Community, all senators are divided into two language groups: a Dutch language group and a French language group. The Dutch language group consists of members appointed by the Flemish Parliament, members appointed by the Dutch language group of the Parliament of the Brussels-Capital Region, and the members co-opted by the two aforementioned groups. The French language group consists of members appointed by the Parliament of the French Community, members appointed by the Parliament of Wallonia, members appointed by the French language group of the Parliament of the Brussels-Capital Region, and the members co-opted by the three aforementioned groups. There are 35 senators in the Dutch language group, 24 in the French language group, and one in the German language group.

== Brussels ==
Article 67 of the Belgian Constitution determines that at least one of the senators in the Dutch language group must be resident in the Brussels-Capital Region on the date of their election, as well as six of the senators in the French language group.

== Officers ==
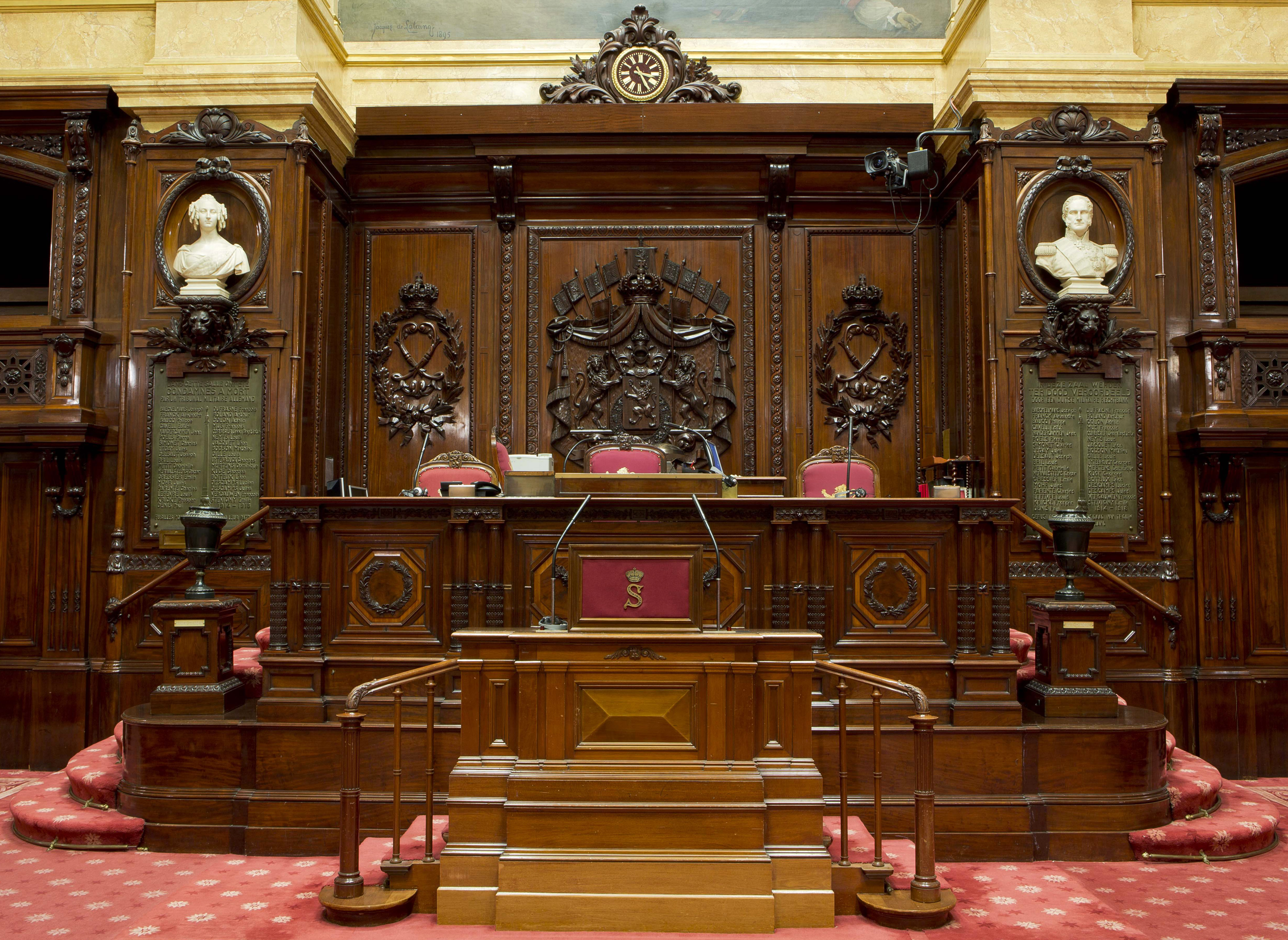
Seat of the president of the Senate

The president of the Senate is elected by the Senate at the beginning of each parliamentary term. The president is assisted by two vice presidents, who are also elected at the beginning of each parliamentary term. The president of the Senate is usually a member of a party of the majority with a great deal of political experience, while the first vice president is a member of the other language group.

The current president is Valérie De Bue of the Reformist Movement.

The president of the Senate presides over the plenary assembly of the Senate, manages and controls debates in the assembly, is responsible for ensuring the democratic functioning of the Senate, maintains order and security in the assembly and enforces the rules of the Senate. The president represents the Senate at both the national (to the other institutions) and the international level. Additionally, the president chairs the Bureau, which determines the order of business, supervises the administrative services of the Senate, and leads the Senate's activities.

The president of the Senate, together with the president of the Chamber of Representatives, ranks immediately behind the King in the order of precedence. The elder of the two takes the second place in the order of precedence.

The Bureau of the Senate is composed of the president, the two vice presidents, and the leaders of the political groups that are represented in the standing committees. The Bureau leads the day-to-day activities of the Senate and convenes every two weeks in order to manage the work of the Senate. The Bureau determines the legislative agenda and the order of business in the plenary assembly and the committees, and manages the internal affairs of the Senate. A member of the Federal Government is usually invited to attend the discussions about the legislative agenda. The Bureau also assists the président in the conduct of parliamentary business. In addition, the Bureau also appoints, promotes, and dismisses the staff of the Senate.

The Senate is served by a number of civil servants. The Senate's chief administrative officer is the secretary-general of the Senate, who is appointed by the assembly and heads the Senate's legislative services. He is assisted by the director-general who heads the administrative services and replaces the secretary-general in his absence.

== Competences ==
The Senate mainly has the following tasks:

Legislation: The Senate, together with the Chamber, has full competence for the Constitution and legislation on the organization and functioning of the federal state and the federated entities. Depending on the type of law, different procedures are possible that require, among others, special majorities (i.e. a two-thirds majority in the Senate, combined with a majority in each language group).

Information reports: The Senate may draw up information reports, in particular concerning topics that are governed by rules and regulations of different state levels.

Conflicts of interest: Within the logic of federalism, the Senate mediates in possible conflicts of interest between the different parliaments of the country.

International parliamentary organizations: The Senate sends parliamentary delegations to different interparliamentary conferences and organizations. Through their representatives in the Senate, the federated entities have access to this interparliamentary cooperation.

Subsidiarity: Following the EU Treaties, the Senate has the right as chamber of the federal parliament to ensure that the European Union does not take an initiative on an issue that is better dealt with at another level. This is the so-called early warning mechanism concerning subsidiarity.

Appointments to courts: The Senate participates in a number of appointments to high courts (Constitutional Court, Council of State, High Council of Justice).

== Committees ==
Before a dossier or topic for debate is dealt with in plenary, it is prepared in one of the committees of the Senate. In addition to the standing committees, the Senate can set up special committees, working groups, advisory committees or joint committees (together with the Chamber). A standing committee consists of 20 senators. The political strength of the committees reflects the strength of the political groups in the plenary session.

The Senate had three standing committees:

- Institutional Affairs Committee: deals mainly with issues related to the Constitution and the legislation on the organization and functioning of the federal state and the federated entities.
- Transversal Affairs Committee: deals mainly with issues that are governed by rules and regulations of different state levels.
- Committee for Democratic Renewal and Citizenship.

The Senate also has an Equal Opportunities Advisory Committee that focuses on equality between women and men.

The Senate and the Chamber of Representatives have established three joint committees:

- Federal Advisory Committee on EU Affairs
- Parliamentary Committee for Law Evaluation
- Parliamentary Concertation Committee: this committee deals with all issues relating to the legislative processes where both the Senate and the Chamber are involved in.

== Non-permanent body ==
Given its limited legislative power, since the reform of 2014, the Senate holds about ten plenary sessions a year. The standing committees of the Senate, however, determine their own meeting schedule.

== Current composition ==
This is the composition of the Senate following the federal and regional elections of June 9, 2024.

Senate of Belgium - current composition (2024-)

Affiliation	Language group	Community & Regional	Co-opted	Total
N-VA	Dutch	8	2	10
MR	French	8*	1	9
Vlaams Belang	Dutch	7	1	8
PVDA-PTB	Dutch/French	5	1	6
PS	French	5	1	6
LE	French	4	1	5
CD&V	Dutch	4	1	5
Vooruit	Dutch	4	1	5
Ecolo-Groen	French/Dutch	3	0	3
Anders	Dutch	2	1	3
Total		50	10	60

* Including the senator of the German-speaking community

== See also ==
- Belgian Chamber of Representatives
- Belgian Federal Parliament
- List of presidents of the Belgian Senate
- Politics of Belgium
