= Council of State (Belgium) =

Supreme administrative court of Belgium

Coordinates: 50.8433°N 4.3719°E

The Council of State (Dutch: Raad van State; French: Conseil d'État; German: Staatsrat) is the supreme administrative court of Belgium. Its functions include assisting the executive with legal advice and being the supreme court for administrative justice. Its members are (for the most part) high level jurists.

The Council meets and has offices in the Palace of the Marquess of Assche (Hôtel van der Noot d'Assche), built by Alphonse Balat.

== History ==
After Belgium gained its independence from the Netherlands, the Belgian government hesitated to create a Council of State, given the perceived abuse of the Dutch Council of State. Thus one was not created in Belgium.

After World War II, the need arose for a Supreme Administrative Court, and such an organ was created by the law of 23 December 1946 as a body that administers justice. It does not officially belong to the judiciary; rather, it falls under the jurisdiction of the minister of the interior.

Since then, the Belgian Constitution has been amended to include the existence of the Council of State. Article 160 of the Belgian Constitution provides that there is, for all of Belgium, one Council of State, the composition, competence and functioning of which are regulated by law. The organisation and functioning of the Council of State are presently provided for by the organic laws on the Council of State, coordinated by the Royal Decree of 12 January 1973.

== Organisation and competence ==
=== Organisation ===
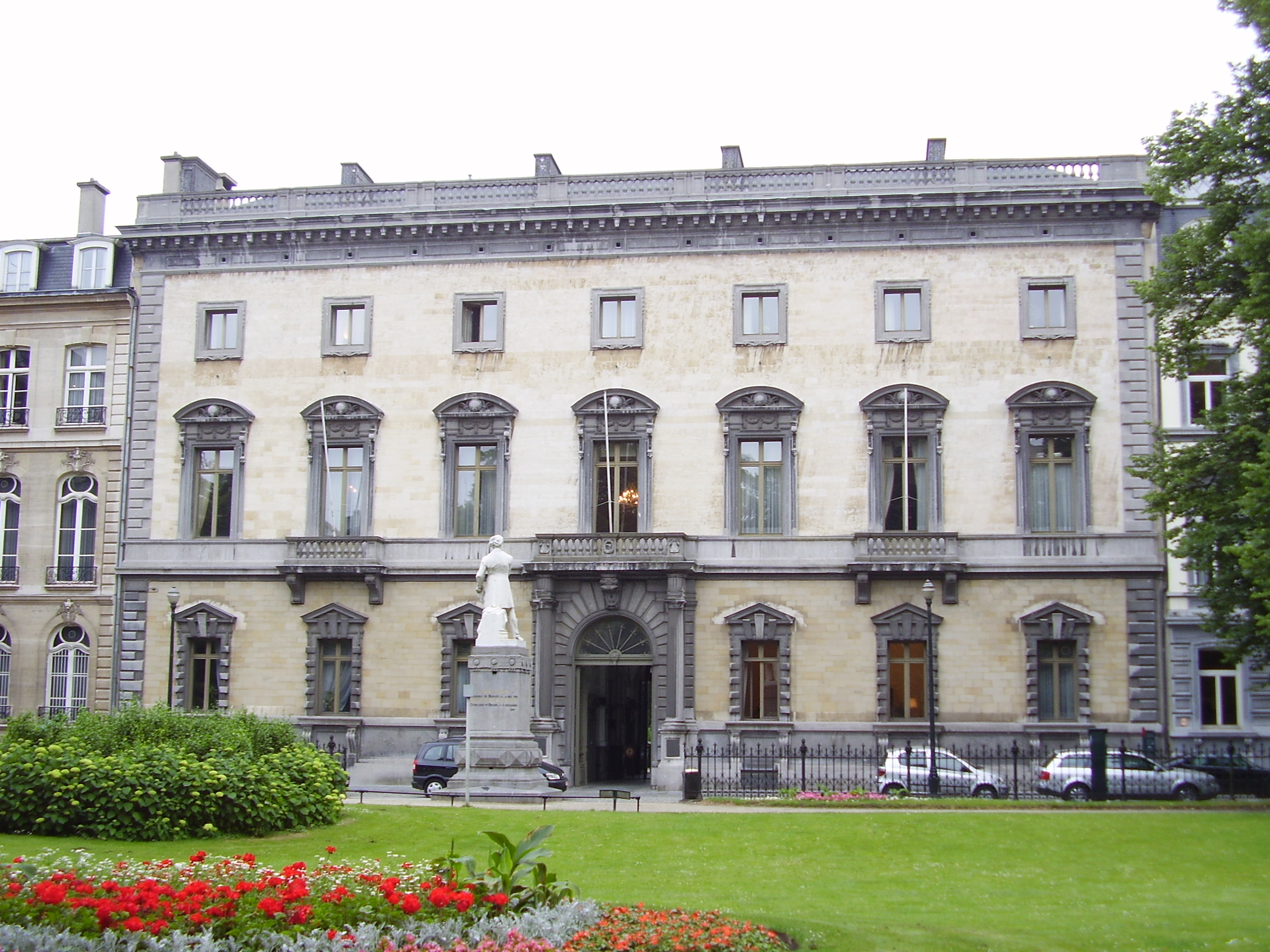
View of the Hôtel van der Noot d'Assche in Brussels which accommodates the Council of State

The Council of State comprises the council, the auditeurs' office, the coordination office, the registry and the administrative staff. The Council is further divided into a Legislative section and an Administrative litigation section.

The Council has 44 judges:

- a First President
- a President
- 14 Presidents of Chambers
- 28 Councillors

The judges themselves elect their Presidents. Chamber Presidents are elected from those judges who are at least three years on the bench, Presidents and the First President are elected from judges at least eleven years with the Council of State of which at least five years as a judge.

The aforementioned judges are appointed for life by the King out of a list containing three names nominated by the Council of State itself. If the nominating list was made unanimous by the Council of State, the person topping the list will be appointed unless the minister of the interior vetoes the appointment because the conditions of the law are not met. If the minister accepts these nominations then he/she proceeds to notify the Belgian Senate and the Belgian Chamber of People's Representatives, which can refuse the nominations if they consider the number of former auditeurs to have grown too large. In this case the Council of State drafts a new list. If the list with nominations by the Council was not unanimous then the Chamber or Senate can draft a new list containing three names; the King will proceed to appoint one of the candidates from these two lists.

In order to become a judge on the Council of State the following conditions must be met:

- at least 37 years of age
- legal degree
- at least ten years of legal experience
- one of the following conditions:
  - succeeded in a government exam for auditeur or referendary
  - administrative function of rank 15 in a Belgian civil service
  - holder of a doctorate in law
  - Belgian magistrate
  - professor of law at a Belgian university.

The Council has its seat at the following address: Wetenschapsstraat/rue de la Science 33 in Brussels. The building is a hôtel particulierknown as Palais du marquis d'Assche

=== Jurisdiction ===
The Belgian Council of State was modelled after her French namesake with greatly similar powers.

==== Litigation ====
The Council hears cases against decisions of the federal government (royal decrees, regulations issued by ministers, decisions by committees with a national competency) and decisions of the regional governments and the governments of the communities (executive orders, regulations issued by ministers,...) as well as against decisions of the provincial and municipal governments and decisions of various state organs.

The Council of State examines the conformance of these regulations and administrative decisions with respect to the Constitution, (higher) administrative decisions, the general principles of Law, statute law, international treaties and conventions. The general principles of Law are principles that are not found in any statute, yet derive from the spirit of the body of law; they are discovered by the Council and thus made into case law.

The Council is the cassation jurisdiction for decisions by administrative courts of appeal, meaning that it hears cases in which the plaintiff argues that the court of appeal ignored or misinterpreted law.

The procedure is inquisitorial: the litigant writes a letter to the Council, stating precisely what happened and why he feels that the defendant acted illegally; the Council then starts an inquiry, asking the other party (generally, a government or government agency) for precisions, and so on until the Council has a clear picture of the case. The litigant does not have the burden of proof: the Council may well decide that the litigant was right and the government was wrong if the information supplied by the litigant was sufficient to enable it to find the missing proofs. Of course, both parties may supply supplemental information until the case is ready for final judgment. A litigant has to make his claim within 60 days after the publication of the regulation in the Belgisch Staatsblad/Moniteur Belge, or if it is a decision which affects only a limited number of people, within 60 days after he gets notified of it.

In some cases, it is unclear whether a case should be heard before administrative courts or judiciary courts. In this case, Court of Cassation decides who has jurisdiction.

==== Advisory capacity ====
Whenever federal Acts or Decrees are drawn up by the federal parliaments (federation, communities or regions) or Decrees by the federal government (Royal or Ministerial Decrees) or by a regional government, these must first before being adopted and published in the Belgisch Staatsblad/Moniteur Belge be sent to the Legislative Section for its advice. Normative texts coming from the executive power must be submitted for advice in draft form whereas for normative texts originating from a member of parliament, the advice is optional. The Council of State's advice will contain arguments with regards to the competence of the organ proposing the act or regulation, the legality vis-a-vis hierarchical rules as well as linguistic arguments.

== See also ==
- Constitutional Court of Belgium
- Court of Cassation
