= High Council of Justice (Belgium) =

National council of the judiciary of Belgium

The High Council of Justice (Dutch: Hoge Raad voor de Justitie, French: Conseil supérieur de la Justice, German: Hoher Justizrat) is the national council of the judiciary of Belgium. It was established in 1999 by Article 151 of the Belgian Constitution and is responsible for exercising external oversight over the operation of the judicial system, handling complaints, submitting advice and opinions to policymakers, nominating candidates for appointments to the judiciary and preparing guidelines for the training of the members of the magistracy.

== See also ==
- List of Belgian Judges
