= List of grand cordons of the Order of Leopold =

The grand cordon of the Order of Leopold is the highest and oldest rank of chivalry and a formal diplomatic gift of the Kingdom of Belgium. This honour is bestowed very rarely in name of the grand-master, the king of the Belgians. This list is chronological by official authorisation of the Royal Decree.

== 19th century ==
=== Leopold I, 1832-1865 ===
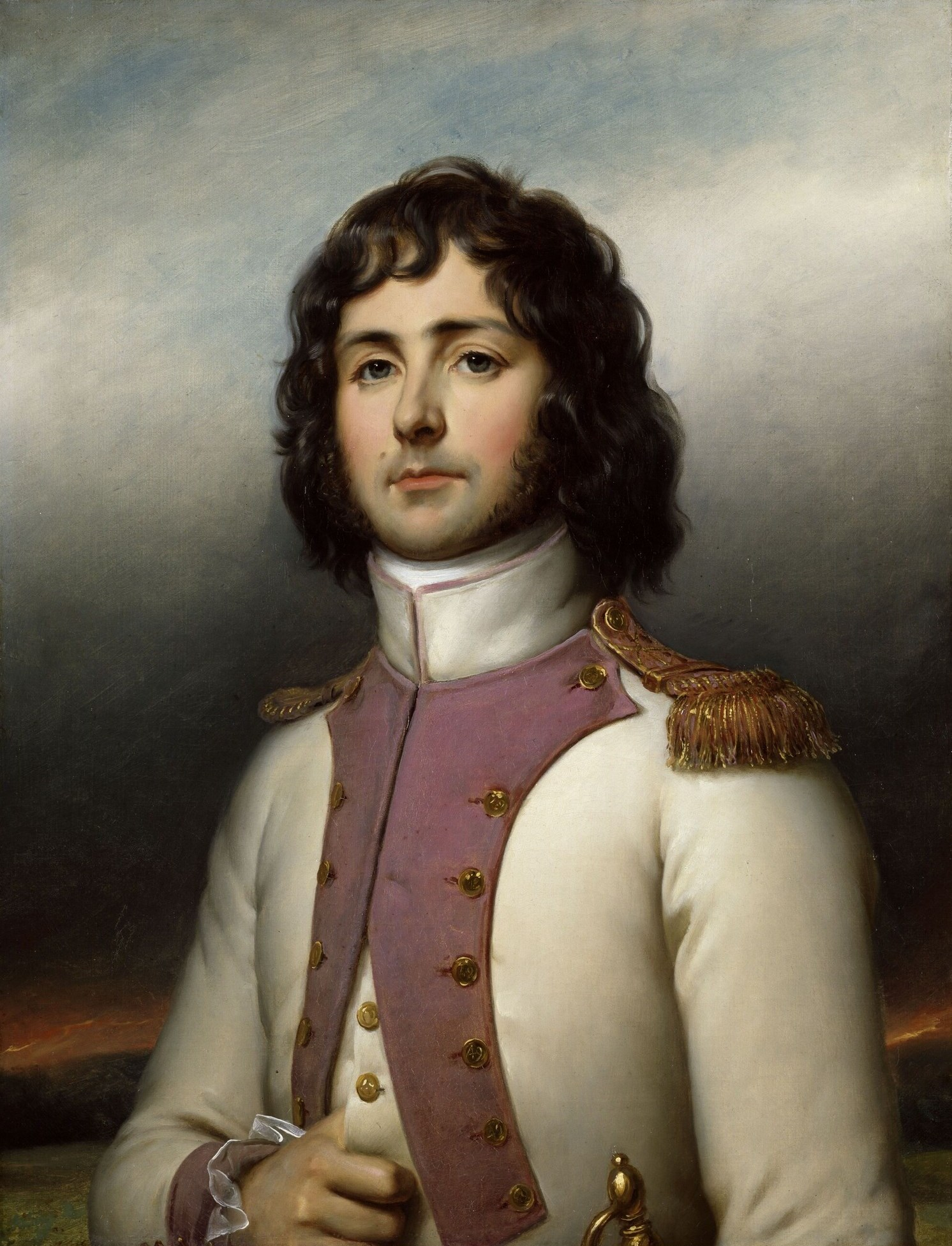
Horace François Sébastiani

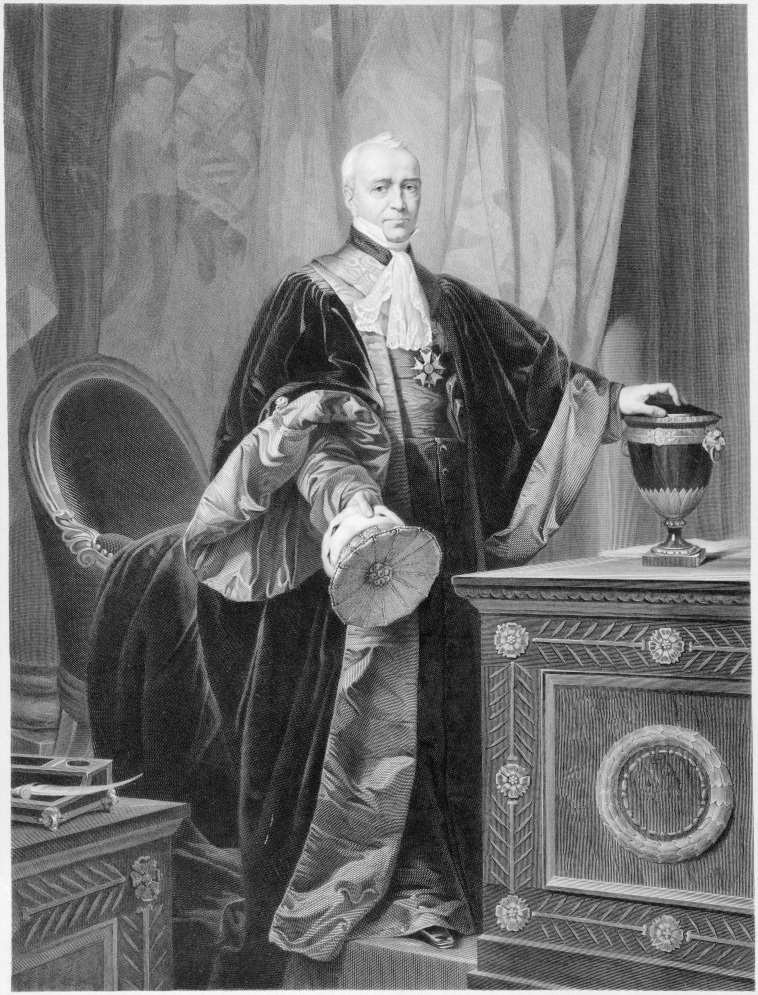
Etienne-Denis Pasquier (1767–1852)

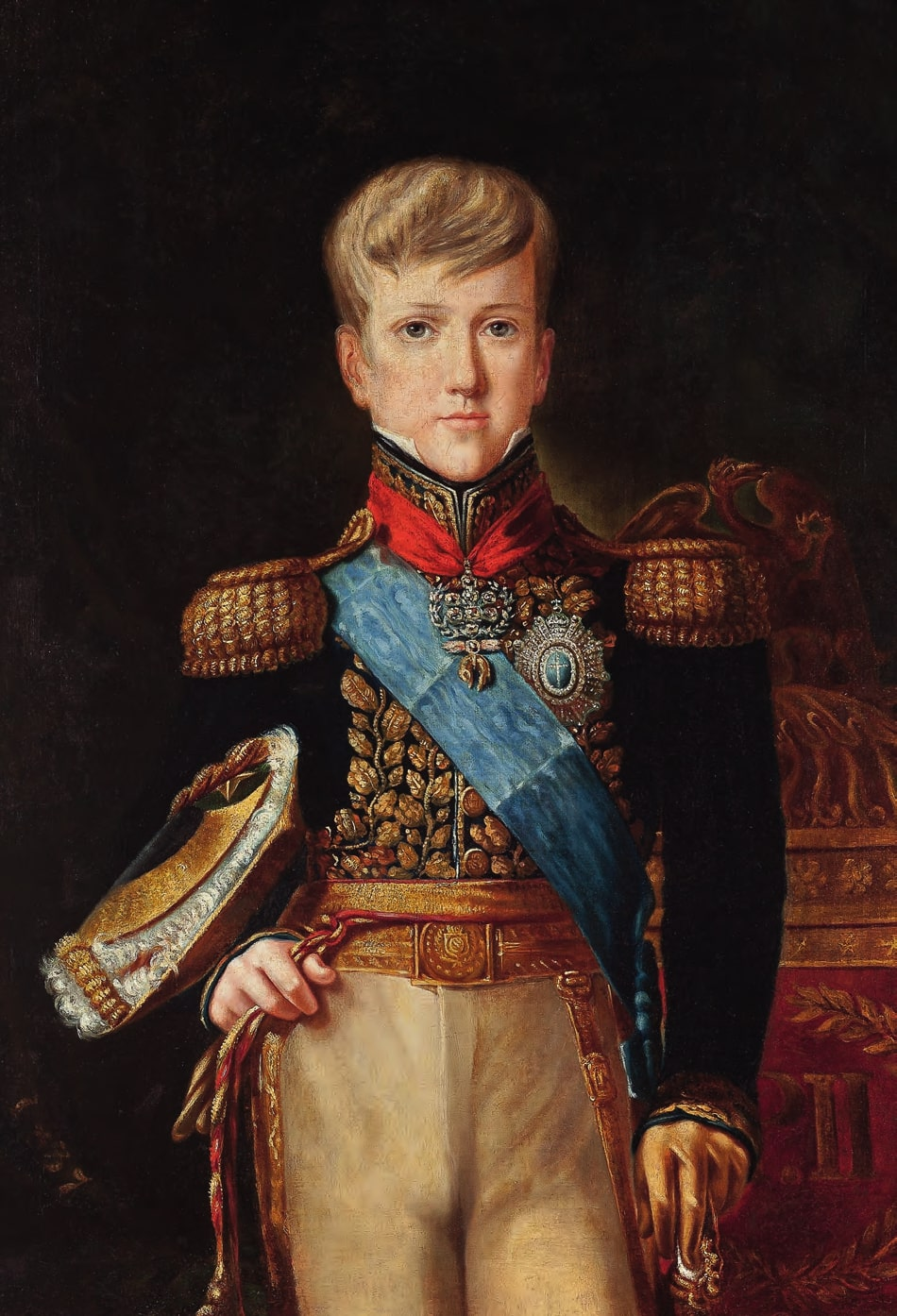
Pedro II of Brazil was the youngest grand Cordon in Belgian History, only ten years old

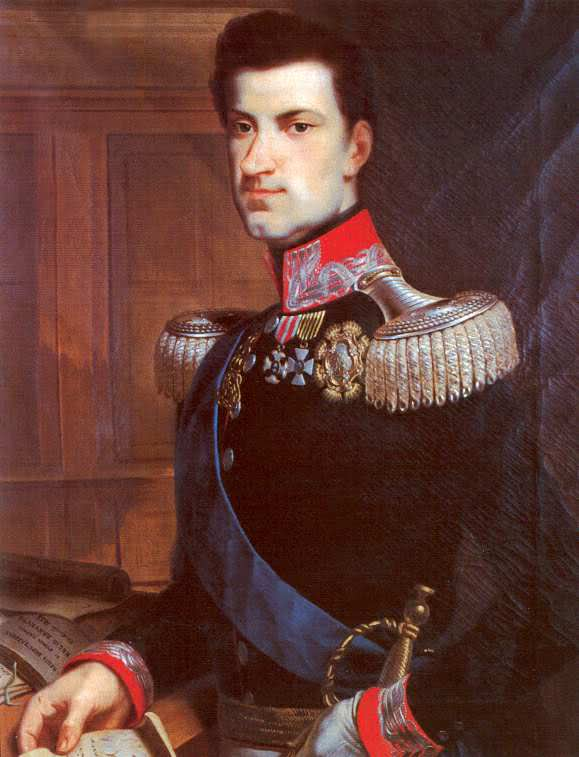
King of Sardinia

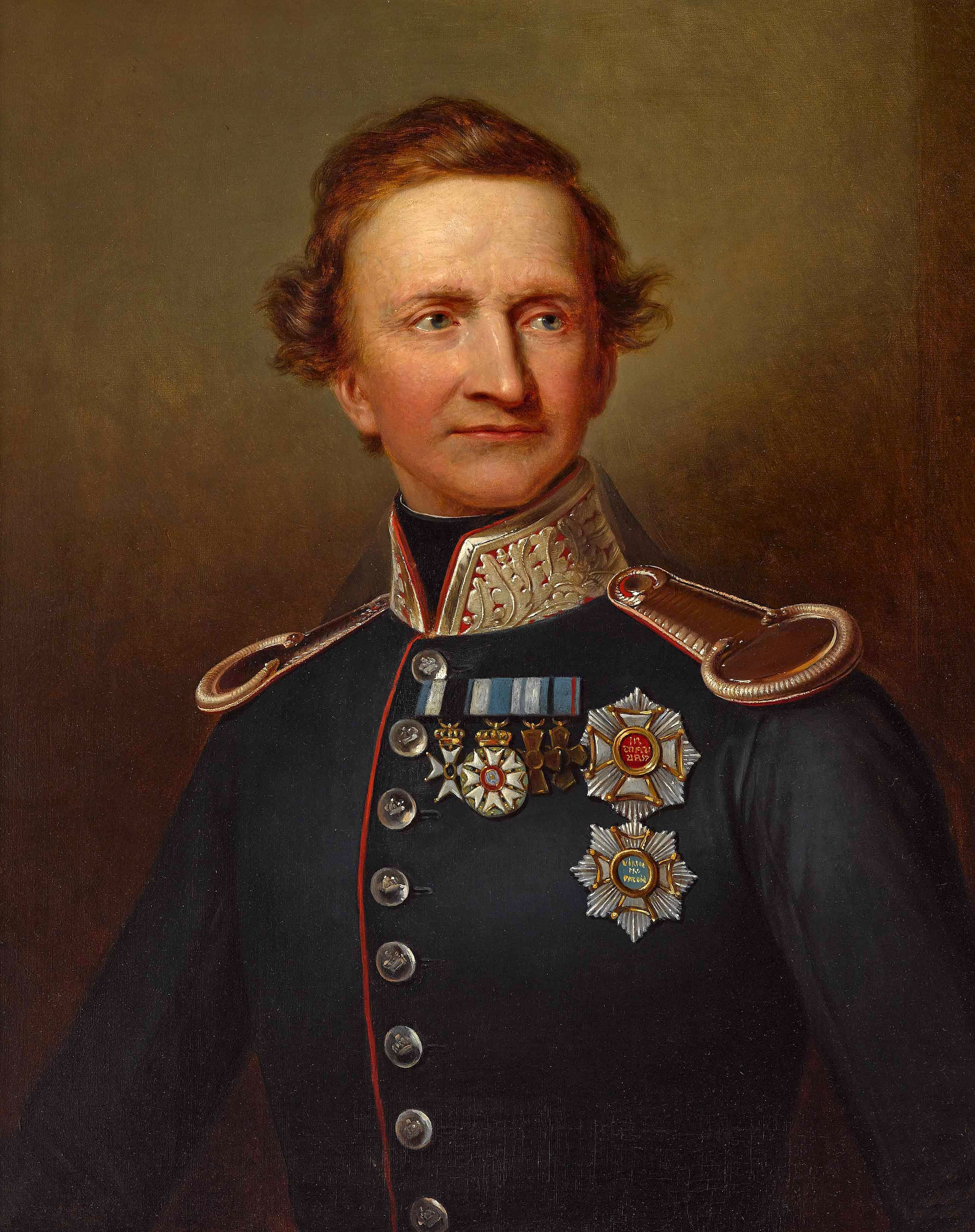
King of Bavaria

| Name | Date | Function |
|---|---|---|
| King Leopold I of Belgium | 1832 | Grand-Master and Founder |
| King Louis Philippe I | 1833 | Wedding gift to his Father-in-law |
| Ferdinand Philippe, Duke of Orléans | 1833 | Wedding gift to his Brother-in-law |
| Prince Louis, Duke of Nemours | 1833 | Wedding gift to his Brother-in-law |
| Charles Joseph, Comte de Flahaut | 1833 | Ambassador to the Court of St James's |
| Horace-François de La Porta | 1833 | French Minister of Foreign Affairs |
| Jean-de-Dieu Soult, 1st Duke of Dalmatia | 1833 | 10th Prime Minister of France |
| Georges Mouton, Count of Lobau | 1833 | Marshal of France |
| Étienne, 1st Count Gérard | 1833 | 11th Prime Minister of France |
| Gabriel Neigre | 1833 | French General |
| Étienne-Denis, Duke of Pasquier | 1833 | President of the Chamber of Peers |
| Baron Saint-Cyr Nugues | 1833 | French General |
| John Lambton, 1st Earl of Durham | 1833 | Lord Privy Seal |
| François-Nicolas-Benoît Haxo | 1833 | French Army General |
| Duke of Choiseul-Stainville | 1833 | Governor of the Louvre Palace |
| Victor, 3rd Duke of Broglie | 1833 | Pair of France |
| Pedro II of Brazil | 1835 | Emperor of Brazil |
| Ernest I, Duke of Saxe-Coburg and Gotha | 1835 | Reigning Duke |
| Prince Ferdinand of Saxe-Coburg and Gotha | 1835 | Brother of the King |
| Ferdinand II of Portugal | 1835 | King of Portugal |
| Baron Gaspard Gourgaud | 1837 | French General |
| José Travassos Valdez, 1st Count of Bonfim | 1838 | 12th Prime Minister of Portugal |
| Prosper Louis, 7th Duke of Arenberg | 1838 | Duke of Arenberg |
| Eugène, 8th Prince of Ligne | 1838 | President of the Senate |
| Albert of Saxe-Coburg and Gotha | 1839 | Wedding gift |
| Ernest II, Duke of Saxe-Coburg and Gotha | 1859 | Nephew |
| Henri Count of Merode | 1839 | Ambassador |
| Bernard Pierre Magnan | 1839 | Marshal of France |
| Ludwig I of Bavaria | 1840 | King of Bavaria |
| Charles Albert of Sardinia | 1840 | King of Sardinia |
| Mgr. Luigi Lambruschini | 1840 | Cardinal Secretary of State |
| Bernhard II, Duke of Saxe-Meiningen | 1840 | Duke |
| Georg II, Duke of Saxe-Meiningen | 1840 | Heretier Duke |
| Joseph, Duke of Saxe-Altenburg | 1840 | Duke of Saxe-Altenburg |
| Alexander, Duke of Württemberg | 1841 | Duke of Württemberg |
| Otto of Greece | 1841 | King of Greece |
| Prince Wilhelm of Prussia | 1841 | Prussian Prince |
| Henri d'Orléans, Duke of Aumale | 1842 | Brother-in-law |
| François d'Orléans, Prince of Joinville | 1842 | Brother-in-law |
| Leopold, Grand Duke of Baden | 1843 | Grand Duke |
| Frederick Augustus II of Saxony | 1843 | King of Saxony |
| Louis II, Grand Duke of Baden | 1843 | Crown Prince of Baden |
| Christian VIII of Denmark | 1843 | King of Denmark |
| Augustus, Grand Duke of Oldenburg | 1844 | Grand Duke |
| Prince August of Saxe-Coburg and Gotha | 1844 | Prince |
| Leopold II of Tuscany | 1844 | Grand Duke |
| Antoine, Duke of Montpensier | 1844 | Brother-in-law |
| Emmanuel, Count of Mensdorff-Pouilly | 1845 | Brother-in-law |
| Archduke John of Austria | 1845 | Imperial Regent |
| Frederick William, Elector of Hesse | 1846 | Prince Elector |
| Pope Leo XIII | 1846 | Apostolic Nuncio |
| Baron Louis Atthalin | 1847 | ADC of King Louis |
| Ferdinand II | 1847 | King of the Two Sicilies |
| Charles XV of Sweden | 1849 | King of Sweden |
| William III of the Netherlands | 1849 | King of the Netherlands |
| Franz Joseph I of Austria | 1849 | Emperor of Austria |
| Oscar I of Sweden | 1849 | King of Sweden |
| Maximilian II of Bavaria | 1850 | King of Bavaria |
| Frederick William IV of Prussia | 1850 | King of Prussia |
| Prince Leopold of Saxe-Coburg and Gotha | 1850 | Nephew |
| William I, German Emperor | 1851 | Heir to the Prussian throne |
| Count d'Azeglio | 1851 | Minister of Foreign affairs |
| Théodore Quinette de Rochemont | 1852 | French diplomat |
| Otto Theodor von Manteuffel | 1852 | Minister |
| Maximilian I of Mexico | 1853 | Wedding gift |
| Archduke Karl Ludwig of Austria | 1853 | Wedding gift |
| John of Saxony | 1853 | King of Saxony |
| Leopold II of Belgium | 1853 | Duke of Brabant |
| George V of Hanover | 1853 | King of Hannover |
| Frederick III, German Emperor | 1853 | Future German Emperor |
| Peter II, Grand Duke of Oldenburg | 1853 | Grand Duke |
| Prince Charles of Prussia | 1853 | Prince |
| Charles Alexander, Grand Duke of Saxe-Weimar-Eisenach | 1853 | Grand Duke of Saxe-Weimar-Eisenach |
| Emperor Napoleon III | 1854 | Emperor of France |
| Prince Napoleon | 1854 | Prince |
| Luís I of Portugal | 1854 | Future King of Portugal |
| Pedro V of Portugal | 1854 | King of Portugal |
| Count Charles Lanckoroński | 1855 | Imperial Lord Chamberlain |
| George, King of Saxony | 1855 | King of Saxony |
| Prince Philippe, Count of Flanders | 1855 | Heir presumptive to the Belgian Throne |
| Vély-Eddin-Rifaat-Pach | 1855 | Ambassador |
| Jerôme Bonaparte of Westphalia | 1855 | King of Westphalia |
| Antonio López de Santa Anna | 1855 | President of Mexico |
| Francis II of the Two Sicilies | 1855 | Duke of Calabria |
| Luigi, Count Cibrario | 1855 | Minister of the Foreign Office |
| Mehmed Fuad Pasha | 1855 | Ottoman Minister of Foreign Affairs |
| Mgr. Giacomo Antonelli | 1855 | Cardinal Secretary of State |
| Alexandre, Count Colonna-Walewski | 1855 | Diplomat |
| Raymond-Theodore Troplong | 1855 | President of the French Senate |
| Friedrich von Thurn und Taxis | 1855 | Imperial Lord Chamberlain |
| Baron von Budberg | 1855 | ADC of the Tsar |
| Jean-Baptiste, 1st Count Vaillant | 1855 | Marshal of France |
| Victor Emmanuel II of Italy | 1855 | King of Sardinia |
| Heinrich von Wedel | 1855 | Military Governor |
| Bernard Pierre Magnan | 1855 | French Marshal |
| Count Felix de Muelenaere | 1856 | 3rd Prime Minister of Belgium |
| Baron Étienne Constantin de Gerlache | 1856 | 1st President of the Court of Cassation |
| Barthélémy, Count of Theux de Meylandt | 1856 | 5th Prime Minister of Belgium |
| Oscar II of Sweden | 1856 | Duke of Östergötland |
| Albrecht, Duke of Teschen | 1856 | Archduke |
| Heinrich LXVII, Prince of Reuss | 1856 | Prince |
| Alexander II of Russia | 1856 | Tsar of Russia |
| Joseph, 17th Prince of Chimay | 1856 | Diplomat |
| Ferdinand IV, Grand Duke of Tuscany | 1856 | Heir to Tuscany |
| Count Félix de Mérode | 1857 | Defence Minister of Belgium |
| Nuno Barreto, Duke of Loulé | 1857 | President of the Council |
| Grand Duke Nicholas of Russia | 1857 | Grand Duke |
| Grand Duke Konstantin Nikolayevich of Russia | 1857 | Grand Duke |
| Count Anatole de Montesquiou-Fezensac | 1857 | General |
| Marie de Gueulluy, Marquess of Rumigny | 1857 | French Diplomat |
| Baron Louis de Schiervel | 1857 | President of the Senate |
| Frederick VII of Denmark | 1857 | King of Denmark |
| Naser al-Din Shah Qajar | 1857 | Shah of Iran |
| Archduke Joseph Karl of Austria | 1857 | Archduke |
| Alphonse O'Sullivan de Grass | 1859 | Ambassador |
| Henri de Liem | 1859 | ADC of the King |
| Paul Devaux | 1859 | Promoter of King Leopold I |
| Mathieu Leclercq | 1859 | Minister of Justice |
| Boniface, Count de Castellane | 1859 | Marshal of France |
| Edward VII | 1859 | Future King of the United Kingdom |
| Nicholas Alexandrovich, Tsesarevich of Russia | 1859 | Tsesarevich |
| Karl Anton, Prince of Hohenzollern | 1859 | Prince of Hohenzollern |
| Abdulmejid I | 1860 | Ottoman Sultan |
| Adolphe, Grand Duke of Luxembourg | 1861 | Duke of Nassau |
| Muhammad III as-Sadiq | 1861 | Bey of Tunis |
| William, Prince of Orange | 1861 | Heir to Dutch throne |
| Duke Philipp of Württemberg | 1861 | Duke of Württemberg |
| Christian IX of Denmark | 1862 | Future King of Denmark |
| Archduke Stephen of Austria (Palatine of Hungary) | 1862 | Archduke |
| Louis IV, Grand Duke of Hesse | 1862 | Future Grand Duke of Hesse |
| Amadeo, Duke of Aosta | 1863 | Future King of Spain |
| Alfred, Duke of Saxe-Coburg and Gotha | 1863 | Duke of Edinburgh |
| Francisco de Asís, Duke of Cádiz | 1863 | King Consort of Spain |
| Charles I of Württemberg | 1864 | King of Württemberg |

=== Leopold II, 1865-1909 ===
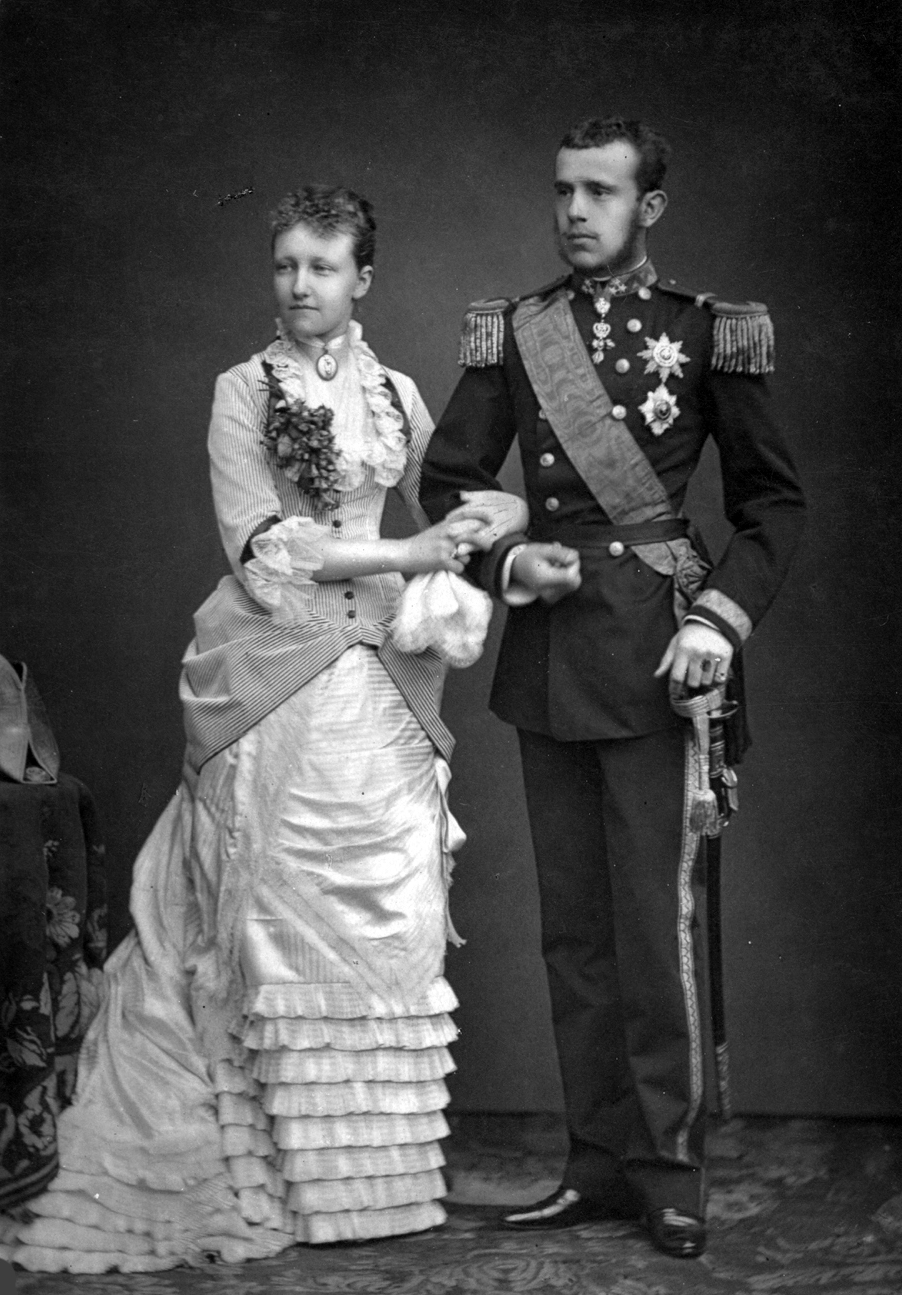
Archduke Rudolf is wearing the Grand Cordon for the official engagement photo. This was a wedding gift of his father-in-law in 1880.

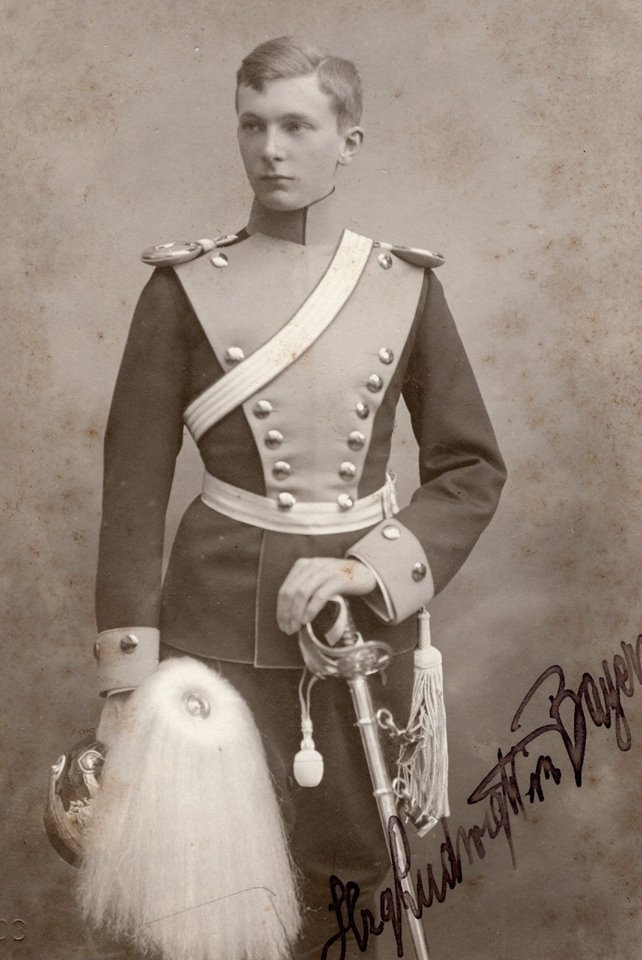
Ludwig Wilhelm, Duke in Bavaria was only 14 years old when he received the wedding gift in honour of his sister.

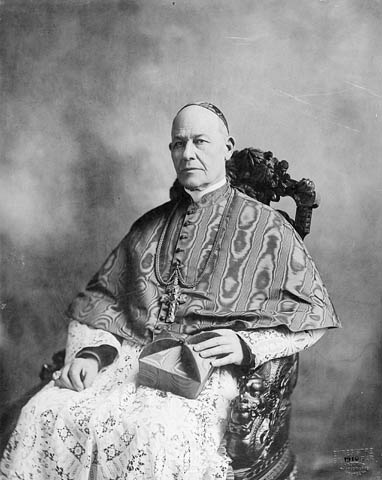
Cardinal Vanutelli

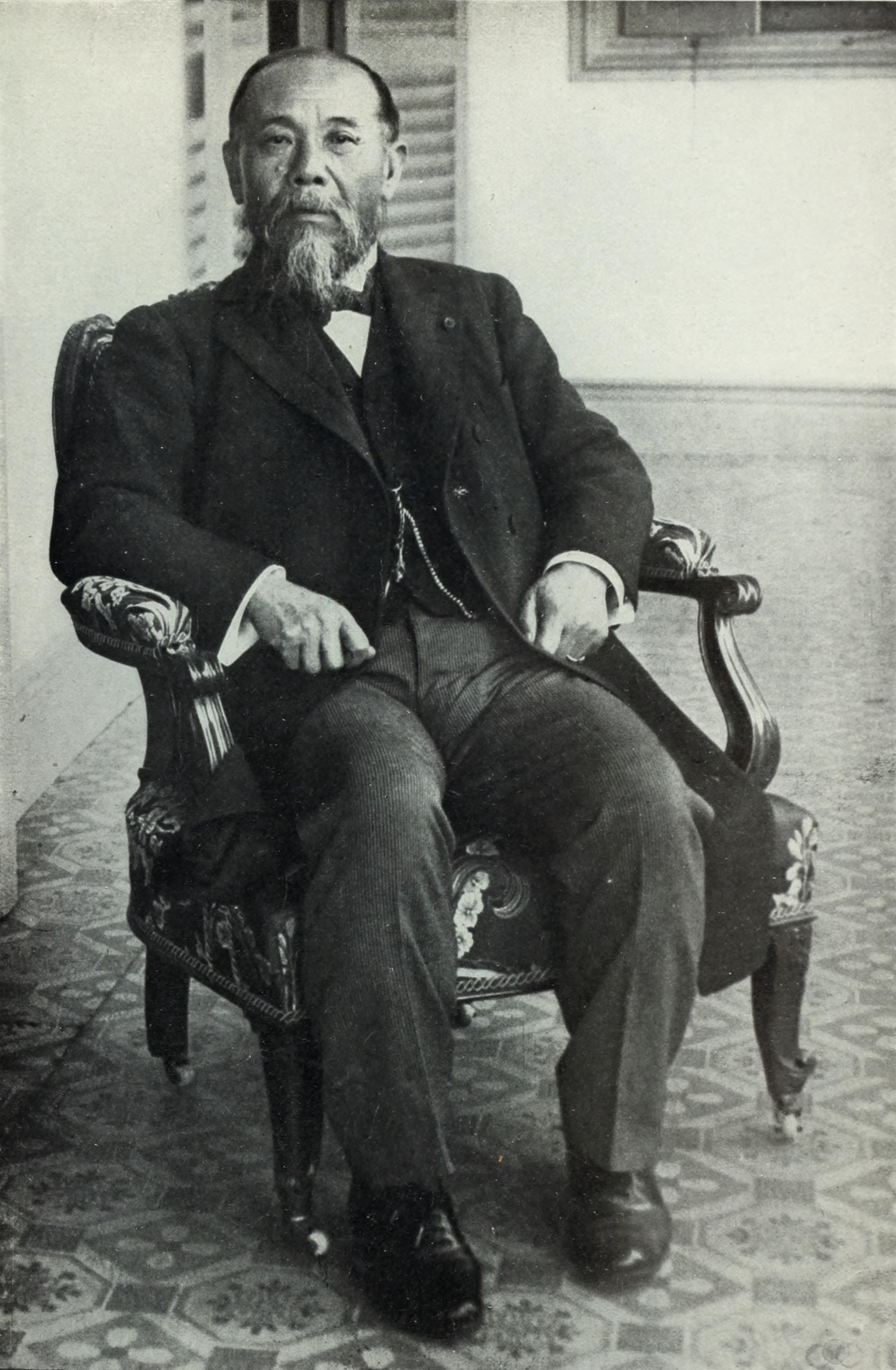
Itō Hirobumi, Prime Minister of Japan

| Name | Year | Function |
|---|---|---|
| Alexander III of Russia | 1865 | Emperor of All Russias |
| Henri de Brouckère | 1866 | Minister |
| Viscount Charles Vilain XIIII | 1866 | Minister |
| Alfonso, Prince of Asturia | 1866 | Crown Prince of Spain |
| Frederik | 1866 | Crown Prince of Denmark |
| Prince Albert of Prussia | 1867 | Prussian Prince |
| Prince Friedrich Karl of Prussia | 1867 | Prussian Prince |
| Prince Albert of Prussia | 1867 | Prussian Prince |
| Prince Adalbert of Prussia | 1867 | Prussian Prince |
| Prince George of Prussia | 1867 | Prussian Prince |
| Prince Alexander of Prussia | 1867 | Prussian Prince |
| Prince Konstantin of Hohenlohe-Waldenburg-Schillingsfürst | 1867 | Obersthofmeister |
| Umberto I of Italy | 1868 | Future King of Italy |
| Carol I of Romania | 1869 | Future King of Romania |
| Barthélémy du Mortier | 1870 | Minister of State |
| Grand Duke Vladimir Alexandrovich of Russia | 1870 | Grand Duke |
| Prince Arthur, Duke of Connaught | 1873 | Governor General of Canada |
| Naser al-Din Shah Qajar | 1873 | King of Persia |
| Archduke Rainer Ferdinand of Austria | 1874 | President of the Expo Vienna |
| Prince Philipp of Saxe-Coburg and Gotha | 1874 | Wedding gift to his Son-in-law |
| Baron Alfred von Fabrice | 1874 | Diplomat of Saxe |
| Patrice de MacMahon, Duke of Magenta | 1874 | President of France |
| Hüseyin Avni Pasha | 1874 | Ottoman Grand Vizier |
| António Cardoso Avelino | 1874 | Minister of Portugal |
| Baron Antoine-Henri Jomini | 1874 | President of the Congress |
| Charles III, Prince of Monaco | 1874 | Prince of Monaco |
| Frederick I, Duke of Anhalt | 1874 | Duke of Anhalt |
| Edouard d'Huart | 1878 | Minister of Finance |
| General Mathieu Brialmont | 1878 | Belgian General |
| Count Bloudoff | 1878 | Ambassador of the Tsar |
| Bohuslav, Count Chotek | 1878 | Ambassador |
| Rafael Carlos Merry del Val | 1878 | Ambassador |
| Mgr. Vincenzo Vannutelli | 1878 | Apostolic Nuncio |
| Gustav von Brandenburg | 1878 | Ambassador |
| Charles Duchatel | 1878 | Ambassador |
| Prince Leopold, Duke of Albany | 1878 | Prince of the United Kingdom |
| Prince Henry of the Netherlands | 1878 | Governor of Luxembourg |
| Bernhard III, Duke of Saxe-Meiningen | 1878 | Future Duke of Saxe-Meiningen |
| Frederick Augustus II, Grand Duke of Oldenburg | 1878 | Future Grand Duke of Oldenburg |
| Prince August of Württemberg | 1878 | Prince of Württemberg |
| Archduke Rudolf, Crown Prince of Austria | 1880 | Wedding gift |
| Walthère Frère-Orban | 1881 | Prime Minister |
| Louis Gallait | 1881 | Painter |
| Archduke Friedrich, Duke of Teschen | 1881 | Archduke |
| Duke William of Württemberg | 1881 | Governor of Bosnia and Herzegovina |
| Jules Malou | 1882 | Minister |
| Count Edmond de Sélys Longchamps | 1882 | President of Senate |
| Wilhelm II, German Emperor | 1884 | Future German Emperor |
| Nicholas II of Russia | 1884 | Future Russian Emperor |
| Prince Albert, Duke of Clarence | 1885 | Cousin, once removed |
| Prince Fushimi Sadanaru | 1886 | Japanese prince |
| Prince Baudouin of Belgium | 1887 | Heir to the Belgian Throne |
| Auguste, Baron Lambermont | 1888 | Minister of State |
| Henry Morton Stanley | 1890 | Royal Explorer of Congo |
| Prince Karl Anton of Hohenzollern | 1894 | Nephew |
| Friedrich Krafft Graf von Crailsheim | 1894 | Foreign Minister of Bavaria |
| Auguste Beernaert | 1894 | Prime Minister |
| François-Auguste Gevaert | 1896 | Composer |
| Christian X of Denmark | 1897 | King of Denmark |
| Prince Valdemar of Denmark | 1897 | Prince of Denmark |
| Prince Svasti Sobhana | 1897 | Prince of Siam |
| Marquis Itō Hirobumi | 1897 | Prime Minister of Japan |
| Rupprecht, Crown Prince of Bavaria | 1897 | Crown Prince of Bavaria |
| Guangxu Emperor | 1898 | Emperor of China |
| Ernst Gunther, Duke of Schleswig-Holstein | 1898 | Wedding gift |
| Queen Wilhelmina of the Netherlands | 1898 | Queen of the Netherlands |
| Queen Emma of the Netherlands | 1898 | Queen Mother |
| Alfred, Hereditary Prince of Saxe-Coburg and Gotha | 1898 | Heir to Saxe-Coburg and Gotha |
| Émile Loubet | 1900 | President of France |
| Prince Kan'in Kotohito | 1900 | Chief of the Imperial Japanese Army |
| Duke Ludwig Wilhelm in Bavaria | 1900 | Wedding gift |
| Prince Arnulf of Bavaria | 1900 | Wedding gift |
| Karl Theodor, Duke in Bavaria | 1900 | Wedding gift |
| Ludwig III of Bavaria | 1900 | Wedding gift |
| Luitpold, Prince Regent of Bavaria | 1900 | Wedding gift |
| Adolf von Auer | 1900 | Member of the Bavarian Chamber |
| Jules von Auer | 1900 | President of the Regency |
| Gustav zu Castell-Castell | 1900 | Grand Master of the Royal Court |
| Afons von Lerchenfeld | 1900 | ADC of the Regent |
| Karl von Perfall | 1900 | Intendant of the Court |
| Albert von Seinsheim | 1900 | Grand Marshal of the Court |
| Franz Joseph von Stein | 1900 | Archbishop |
| Rudolphe von der Tann | 1900 | Ambassador |
| Carl von Wolfskeel von Reichenberg | 1900 | Grand Squire of the Regent |
| Ritter von Xylander | 1900 | ADC of Leopold II |
| Theophile Delclassé | 1900 | Minister |
| Cardinal Goossens | 1900 | Cardinal |
| Gojong of Korea | 1901 | Emperor of Korea |
| Alfonso XIII of Spain | 1902 | King of Spain |
| Maria Christina of Austria | 1902 | Queen of Spain |
| Mozaffar ad-Din Shah Qajar | 1903 | Shah of Iran |
| Cardinal Granito di Belmonte | 1904 | Apostolic Nuncio |
| Count Nikolaus von Wallwitz | 1904 | Ambassador of the German Emperor |
| Sunjong of Korea | 1904 | Imperial Crown Prince |
| Charles, Duke of Saxe-Coburg and Gotha | 1905 | Wedding gift |
| Mgr. Rafael Merry del Val | 1906 | Cardinal |
| Count Kiyoura Keigo | 1906 | 23rd Prime Minister of Japan |
| Haakon VII of Norway | 1906 | King of Norway |
| Prince Maximilian of Baden | 1906 | Prince of Baden |
| Tōgō Heihachirō | 1907 | Japanese Marshal-Admiral |
| Count Charles Woeste | 1907 | Minister |
| Baron Jules d'Anethan | 1907 | Minister |
| Count Paul de Smet de Naeyer | 1907 | Minister |
| Jules Greindl | 1907 | Minister of State |
| Count Charles John d'Oultremont | 1907 | Marshal to the Royal Court |
| Baron Auguste Goffinet | 1907 | Grand Master of the Imperial Household |
| Manuel II of Portugal | 1908 | King of Portugal |
| Prince Kuni Kuniyoshi | 1909 | Japanese Prince |

== 20th century ==
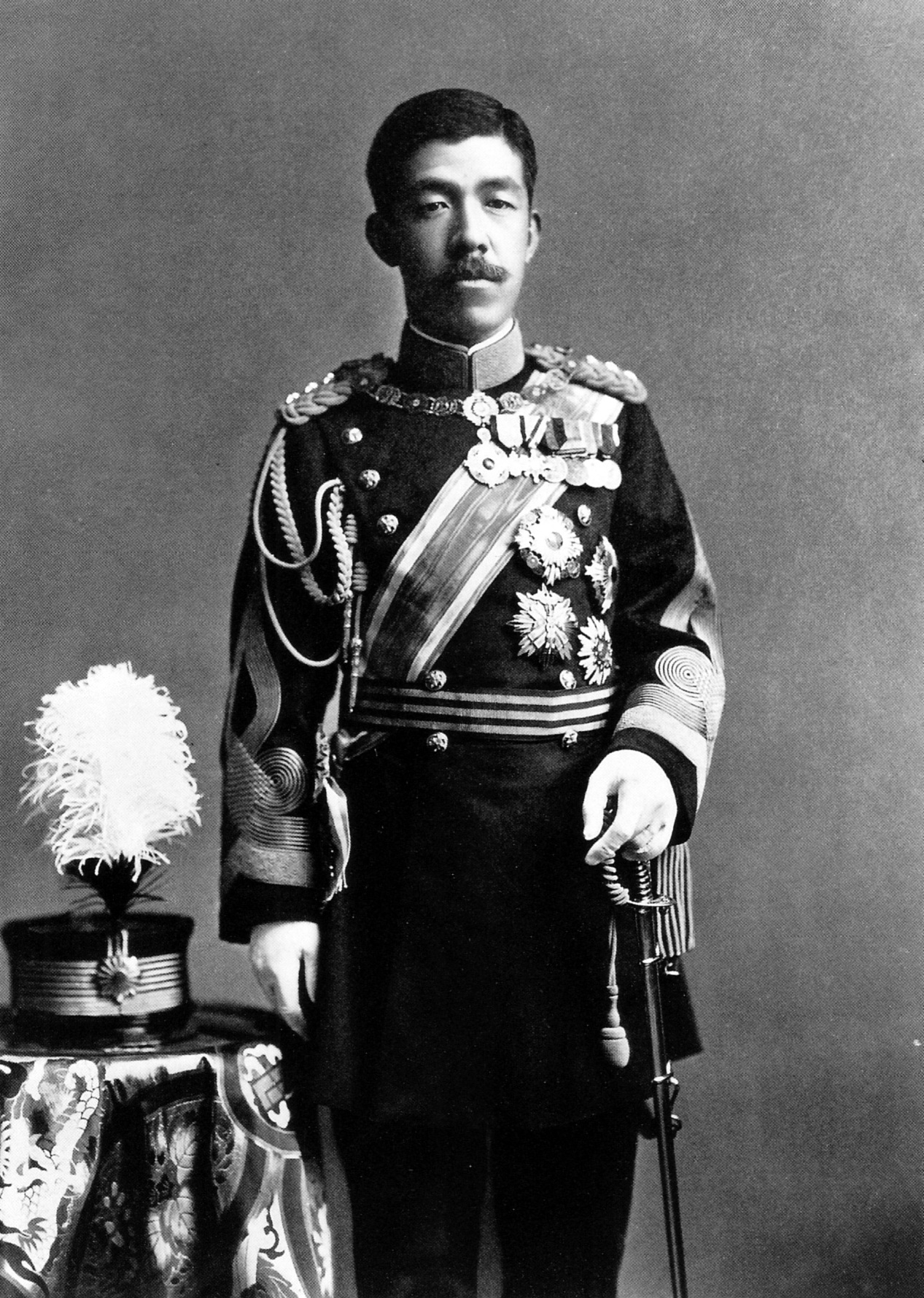
The Emperor of Japan

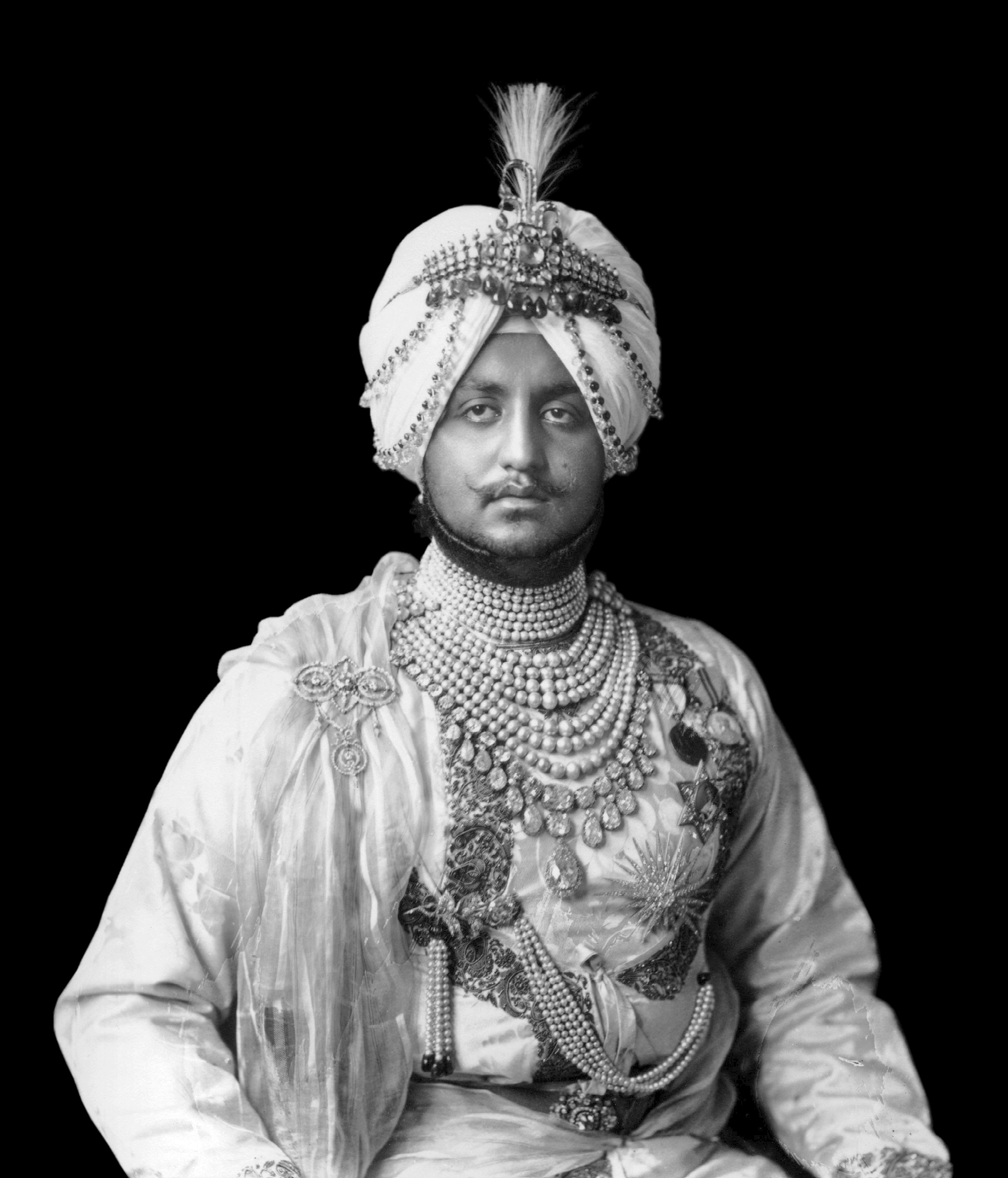
The Maharaja of Patiala

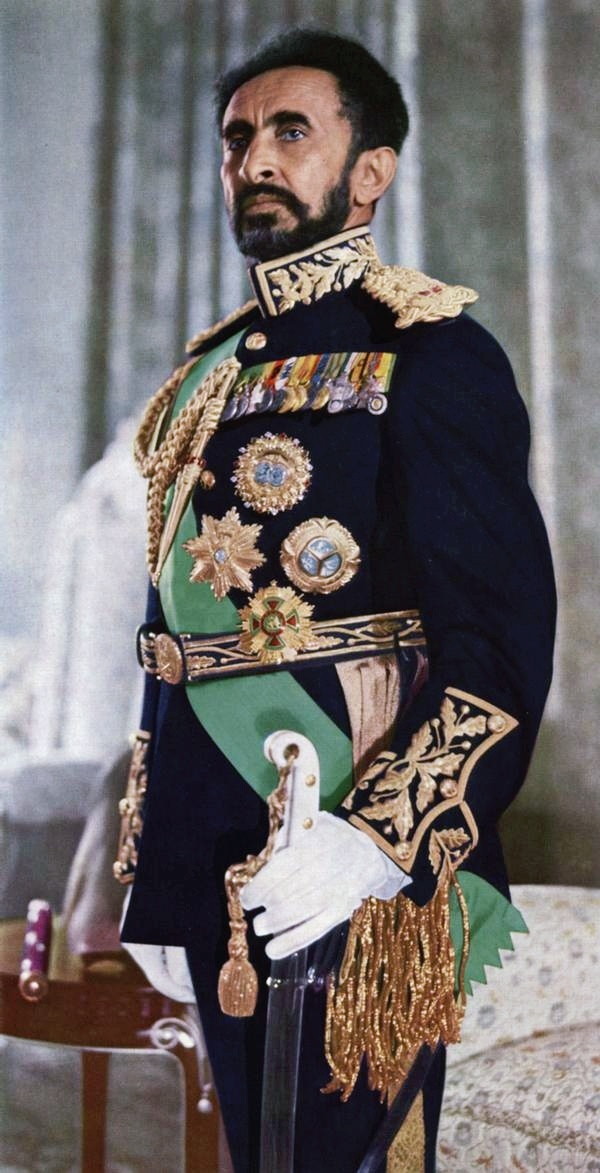
Emperor of Ethiopia

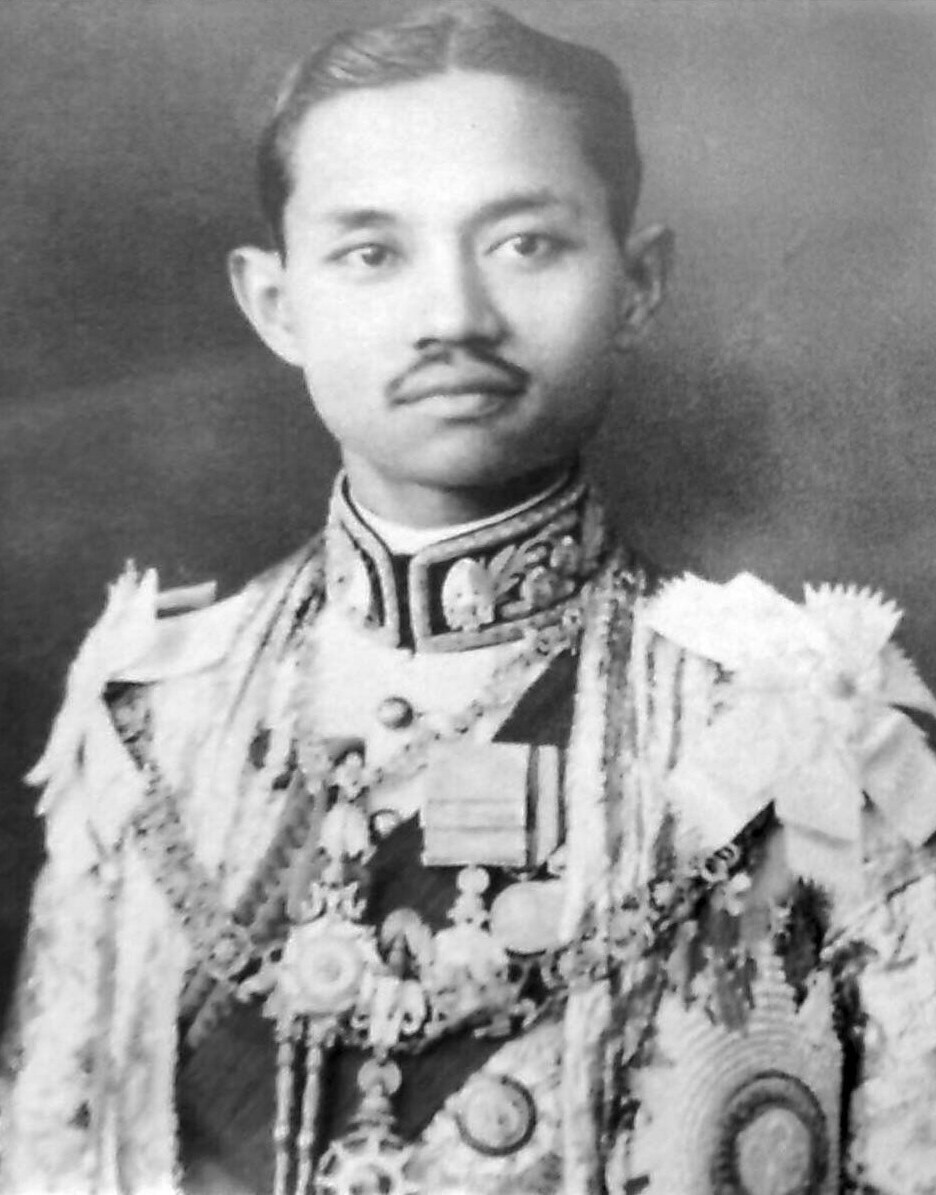
King of Siam

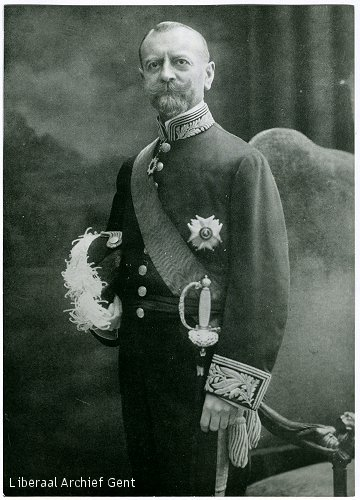
Adolf Max, Lord mayor of the City of Brussels

=== Albert I, 1909-1934 ===
| Name | Year | Function |
|---|---|---|
| Prince Fushimi Hiroyasu | 1910 | Chief of the Japanese Navy |
| Baron Kurino Shin'ichiro | 1910 | Imperial Ambassador |
| Othon van der Staal, Lord of Piershil | 1910 | Dutch Diplomat |
| René de Marees van Swinderen | 1910 | Minister of Foreign Affairs |
| Archduke Eugen of Austria | 1910 | Archduke |
| Antonino Castello, Marquis of San Giuliano | 1911 | Italian Minister of Foreign Affairs |
| Prince Mohammed Ali Tewfik | 1911 | Egyptian Prince |
| Count Toda Ujitaka | 1911 | Master of Ceremonies to the Emperor |
| Abbas II of Egypt | 1911 | Ottoman Viceroy of Egypt |
| Fuad I of Egypt | 1912 | King of Egypt |
| Ma Fuxiang | 1912 | General and minister |
| Joseph Marie Hellebaut | 1912 | Minister of War |
| Raymond Poincaré | 1913 | Prime Minister of France |
| Prince Axel of Denmark | 1913 | Prince of Denmark |
| Erik Scavenius | 1914 | 12th Prime Minister of Denmark |
| Lu Zhengxiang | 1914 | Premier of the Republic of China |
| Ahmad Shah Qajar | 1914 | Shah of Iran |
| Salvador Bermúdez, Duke of Ripalda | 1915 | Minister Foreign Affairs |
| Alexander Cambridge, 1st Earl of Athlone | 1915 | Major General |
| John French, 1st Earl of Ypres | 1916 | Field Marshal |
| Douglas Haig, 1st Earl Haig | 1916 | Field Marshal |
| Emperor Taishō | 1916 | Emperor of Japan |
| Adolphus Cambridge, 1st Marquess of Cambridge | 1916 | Duke of Teck |
| John Jellicoe, 1st Earl Jellicoe | 1917 | Earl |
| General John Pershing | 1917 | Chief of Staff of the U.S. Army |
| Alexander I of Yugoslavia | 1918 | King of Yugoslavia |
| Cardinal Désiré-Joseph Mercier | 1918 | Cardinal |
| Ernest Solvay | 1918 | Chemist |
| Gérard Cooreman | 1918 | Politician |
| Bhupinder Singh | 1918 | Maharaja of Patiala |
| Baron Paul-Louis de Favereau | 1919 | Minister of State |
| Count Charles de Broqueville | 1919 | Minister |
| Count Gérard Leman | 1919 | General |
| Lieutenant-General Louis Bernheim | 1919 | General |
| Lieutenant-General Louis Ruquoy | 1919 | General |
| Baron Alphonse de Dixmude | 1919 | General |
| Baron Armand De Ceuninck | 1919 | General |
| Baron Édouard d'Aigremont | 1919 | General |
| Lieutenant-General Cyriaque Gillain | 1919 | General |
| Lieutenant-General Aloïs Biebuyck | 1919 | General |
| Lieutenant-General Baron Honoré Drubbel | 1919 | General |
| Vice-Admiral William Sims | 1919 | President of the Naval War College |
| Admiral Hugh Rodman | 1919 | Commander in Chief, U.S. Pacific Fleet |
| Mario García Menocal | 1919 | 3rd President of Cuba |
| Faisal I of Iraq | 1919 | King of Iraq |
| Emile Verhaeren | 1920 | Belgian Poet (post mortem) |
| Count Maurice Maeterlinck | 1920 | Nobel Prize in Literature |
| Gustave Ador | 1920 | President of the Swiss Confederation |
| Sir Mineichirō Adachi | 1921 | Japanese Ambassador to Belgium |
| Count Amedée Visart de Bocarmé | 1921 | President of the Chamber |
| Nicholas Murray Butler | 1921 | 12th President of Columbia University |
| Lieutenant-General Harry Jungbluth | 1923 | Chief of the Military Household |
| Pieter Cort van der Linden | 1923 | Prime Minister of the Netherlands |
| Edvard Beneš | 1923 | 4th President of Czechoslovakia |
| Tomáš Garrigue Masaryk | 1923 | 1st President of Czechoslovakia |
| Jhr. John Loudon | 1923 | Minister of Foreign Affairs |
| Baron Léon de Witte de Haelen | 1924 | Inspector-General of the Cavalry |
| Lieutenant-General Victor Bertrand | 1924 | General |
| Emperor Haile Selassie | 1924 | Emperor of Ethiopia |
| Alfredo Zayas y Alfonso | 1924 | President of Cuba |
| Count Makino Nobuaki | 1925 | Lord Keeper of the Privy Seal of Japan |
| Baron Kijūrō Shidehara | 1925 | 31st Prime Minister of Japan |
| Prince Yasuhiko Asaka | 1925 | Prince |
| Reza Shah | 1925 | Imperial Shah of Iran |
| Karl Robert Pusta | 1925 | Minister of Foreign Affairs of Estonia |
| Cardinal Clemente Micara | 1925 | Apostolic Nuncio |
| Jacobo Stuart, Duke of Alba | 1925 | Duke of Alba |
| Rufus Isaacs, 1st Marquess of Reading | 1925 | Governor-General of India |
| Baron Eugène Beyens | 1925 | Minister |
| Jhr. Charles Ruijs de Beerenbrouck | 1925 | Prime Minister of the Netherlands |
| Jhr. Herman Adriaan van Karnebeek | 1925 | Dutch Minister of Foreign Affairs |
| Prajadhipok | 1926 | King of Siam |
| Pedro Nel Ospina Vázquez | 1926 | 11th President of Colombia |
| Miguel Abadía Méndez | 1926 | 12th President of Colombia |
| Louis Betrand | 1926 | Minister of State |
| Emile Francqui | 1926 | Minister of State |
| Antonín Švehla | 1927 | Prime Minister of Czechoslovakia |
| Prince Devawongse Varoprakar | 1927 | Prince and Foreign Minister of Siam |
| Amanullah Khan | 1928 | King of Afghanistan |
| Prince Gustav of Denmark | 1928 | Prince of Denmark |
| Knud, Hereditary Prince of Denmark | 1928 | Prince of Denmark |
| Laust Moltesen | 1928 | Foreign Minister of Denmark |
| Thomas Madsen-Mygdal | 1928 | 10th Prime Minister of Denmark |
| Zog I of Albania | 1929 | King of Albania |
| Rauf Fico | 1929 | Albanian Diplomat |
| Kostaq Kota | 1929 | 14th Prime Minister of Albania |
| Sir William Herbert Phillipps | 1929 | Honorary Consul in Australia |
| Henry Fletcher | 1929 | United States Ambassador |
| Gerardo Machado | 1929 | 5th President of Cuba |
| Émile-Joseph Galet | 1930 | General |
| Nobuhito, Prince Takamatsu | 1930 | Imperial Prince of Japan |
| Isidro Ayora | 1930 | President of Ecuador |
| Petar Živković | 1930 | 8th Prime Minister of Yugoslavia |
| Adolphe Max | 1932 | Mayor of Brussels |
| Jules Renkin | 1932 | 28th Prime Minister of Belgium |
| Ferdinand Foch | 1932 | French Marshal |
| Aloys Van de Vyvere | 1932 | Minister |

=== Leopold III 1934-1951 ===
| Eggert Reeder | 1938 | Governor of Cologne |
| Sir Winston Churchill | 1945 | Prime Minister of the UK |
| General Dwight D. Eisenhower | 1945 | Supreme Allied Commander in Europe (1943–45); later U.S. President (1953–61) |
| Juliana of the Netherlands | 1950 | Queen of the Netherlands |
| Irene of Orange-Nassau | 1950 | Dutch Princess |

=== King Baudouin 1951-1993 ===
| Name | Year | Function |
|---|---|---|
| Amha Selassie | 1859 | Crown Prince of Ethiopia |
| Shah Mohammad Reza Pahlavi | 1960 | Shah of Persia |
| Joseph Kasa-Vubu | 1960 | 1st President of Congo |
| King Rama IX | 1960 | King of Thailand |
| Queen Sirikit of Thailand | 1960 | Queen Consort of Thailand |
| Queen Elizabeth II | 1963 | Queen of the UK |
| Prince Philip, Duke of Edinburgh | 1963 | Prince Consort of the UK |
| Josip Broz Tito | 1970 | President of Yugoslavia |
| Emperor Hirohito | 1971 | Emperor of Japan |
| Empress Kōjun | 1971 | Empress Consort of Japan |
| Erskine Hamilton Childers | 1974 | President of Ireland |
| Edmond Leburton | 1977 | Minister |
| Carl XVI Gustaf | 1977 | King of Sweden |
| Juan Carlos I of Spain | 1978 | King of Spain |
| Queen Sofia | 1978 | Queen Consort of Spain |
| Mstislav Rostropovich | 1989 | Russian Cellist |
| Emperor Akihito | 1990 | Emperor of Japan |
| Prince Philippe of Belgium | 1990 | Son of the Prince of Liège |

=== King Albert II 1993-2013 ===
| Name | year | Function |
|---|---|---|
| Queen Paola of Belgium | 1994 | Queen Consort of Belgium |
| Henri, Grand Duke of Luxembourg | 1994 | Nephew |
| Maria Teresa, Grand Duchess of Luxembourg | 1994 | Grand Duchess |
| Felipe VI of Spain | 1994 | Crown Prince of Spain |
| Infanta Elena, Duchess of Lugo | 1994 | Infanta of Spain |
| Infanta Cristina of Spain | 1994 | Infanta of Spain |
| Andries Kinsbergen | 1995 | Minister |
| Naruhito, Crown Prince of Japan | 1996 | Crown Prince |
| Lucien Buysse | 1997 | Grand Marshal of the Royal Court |
| Princess Astrid of Belgium, Archduchess of Austria-Este | 1997 | Daughter |
| Oscar Stranard | 1998 | President of Court of Cassation |
| Eliane Liekendael | 1998 | Procureur-generaal bij het Hof van Cassatie |
| Aleksander Kwaśniewski | 1999 | President of Poland |
| Jolanta Kwaśniewska | 1999 | First Lady of Poland |
| Roger Lallemand | 1999 | Minister of State |
| Leo Tindemans | 1999 | Minister |
| Louis De Grève | 1999 | Pres. Arbitragehof |
| Frank Swaelen | 1999 | Minister |

== 21st century ==
| Name | Year | Function |
|---|---|---|
| Prince Lorenz of Belgium, Archduke of Austria-Este | 2000 | Son-in-law |
| Jean-Marie Piret | 2000 | Procureur-generaal bij het Hof van Cassatie |
| Queen Mathilde of Belgium | 2000 | Duchess of Brabant |
| Jorge Sampaio | 2000 | President of Portugal |
| Maria Jose Ritta | 2000 | First Lady of Portugal |
| Victoria, Crown Princess of Sweden | 2001 | Duchess of Västergötland |
| Jan Willems | 2001 | Grand Marshal of the Royal Court |
| Georgi Parvanov | 2003 | President of Bulgaria |
| Zorka Parvanova | 2003 | First Lady of Bulgaria |
| Princess Claire of Belgium | 2004 | Daughter-in-law |
| Tarja Halonen | 2004 | President of Finland |
| Mohammed VI of Morocco | 2004 | King of Morocco |
| Roman Herzog | 2005 | President of Germany |
| General Guy Mertens | 2005 | Chief of the Military Household |
| Jean du Jardin | 2005 | Procureur-generaal bij het Hof van Cassatie |
| Frank De Coninck | 2006 | Grand Marshal of the Royal Court |
| Roland Gillet | 2006 | Member of Senate |
| Valdas Adamkus | 2006 | President of Lithuania |
| Alex Arts | 2007 | President of Constitutional Court |
| Vaira Vīķe-Freiberga | 2007 | President of Latvia |
| Marc Lahousse | 2008 | First President Court of Cassation |
| László Sólyom | 2008 | President of Hungary |
| Toomas Hendrik Ilves | 2008 | President of Estonia |
| Guy Verhofstadt | 2008 | 47th Prime Minister of Belgium |
| Count Herman Van Rompuy | 2009 | President of the Chamber of Representatives |
| Michel Melchior | 2010 | President of Constitutional Court |
| Count Jean-Pierre de Launoit | 2012 | President Queen Elisabeth Concours |
| Countess Solange de Liedekerke de Pailhe | 2012 | Lady-in-Waiting of Queen Fabiola |

=== King Philippe (2013-) ===
| Name | Year | Function |
|---|---|---|
| Count Jacques Rogge | 2013 | Honorary President IOC |
| General Major Wilfried Van Kerckhove | 2013 | Grand Master of Household of Queen Fabiola |
| Baron Marc Bossuyt | 2013 | President of the Constitutional Court |
| Xi Jinping | 2014 | President of China |
| Recep Tayyip Erdogan | 2015 | President of Turkey |
| Andrzej Duda | 2015 | President of Poland |
| Agata Kornhauser-Duda | 2015 | First Lady of Poland |
| Joachim Gauck | 2016 | President of Germany |
| Daniela Schadt | 2016 | First Lady of Germany |
| Abdullah II | 2016 | King of Jordan |
| Queen Rania | 2016 | Queen Consort of Jordan |
| Masako | 2016 | Crown Princess of Japan |
| Willem-Alexander | 2016 | King of the Netherlands |
| Maxima of the Netherlands | 2016 | Queen Consort of the Netherlands |
| General Joseph Van den Put | 2016 | Chief of the Military Household |
| Vice-Admiral Pierre Warnauts | 2016 | Chief of Protocol of the Court |
| Marcelo Rebelo de Sousa | 2018 | President of Portugal |
| Emmanuel Macron | 2018 | President of France |
| Jean Spreutels | 2018 | President of the Constitutional Court |
| Princess Elisabeth, Duchess of Brabant | 2019 | Crown Princess of Belgium |
| Baron André Alen | 2020 | President of the Constitutional Court |
| Angela Merkel | 2021 | Chancellor of Germany |
| Sergio Mattarella | 2021 | President of Italy |
| Lieutenant-General Noël De Bruyne | 2021 | Intendant of the Civil List of His Majesty the King |
| Alexander Van der Bellen | 2022 | President of Austria |
| Katerina Sakellaropoulou | 2022 | President of Greece |
| Gitanas Nausėda | 2022 | President of Lithuania |
| Jens Stoltenberg | 2023 | NATO Secretary General. |
| Haitham bin Tariq | 2024 | Sultan of Oman |
| Prince Gabriel of Belgium | 2026 | Son, Prince of Belgium |

== Unknown ==
- Duke of Frias (before 1838)
- Marquis of Saldanha (before 1838)
- Baron of Arnhim (before 1838)
- Mgr Tommaso Pasquale Gizzi, Nuntio (before 1838)
- Mustafa Reşid Pasha (before 1838)
- Charles Joseph, comte Bresson (before 1838)
- General Sá da Bandeira (before 1838)
- Archduke Ludwig Viktor of Austria
- Archduke Franz Ferdinand of Austria
- Archduke Otto of Austria
- Charles I of Austria
- Archduke Charles Stephen of Austria
- Archduke Joseph August of Austria
- Prince William of Baden
- Frederick II, Grand Duke of Baden
- Prince Leopold of Bavaria
- Duke Ludwig Wilhelm in Bavaria
- Marie Henriette of Austria
- Elisabeth of Bavaria, Queen of the Belgians
- Prince Charles, Count of Flanders
- Fabiola of Belgium
- Prince Laurent of Belgium
- Prince Xavier of Bourbon-Parma
- Ferdinand I of Bulgaria
- Boris III of Bulgaria
- Prince Harald of Denmark
- Prince Aage, Count of Rosenborg
- Frederik IX of Denmark
- Ingrid of Sweden
- Margrethe II of Denmark
- Henrik, Prince Consort of Denmark
- Frederik X of Denmark
- Farouk of Egypt
- Prince Henry of Prussia
- Wilhelm, German Crown Prince
- Prince Friedrich Leopold of Prussia
- Hussein bin Ali, King of Hejaz
- Leopold, Prince of Hohenzollern
- Prince Frederick of Hohenzollern-Sigmaringen
- William, Prince of Hohenzollern
- Umberto II of Italy
- Empress Michiko
- Sunjong of Korea
- Prince Rudolf of Liechtenstein
- Prince Felix of Bourbon-Parma
- Jean, Grand Duke of Luxembourg
- Princess Joséphine-Charlotte of Belgium
- Alfred, 2nd Prince of Montenuovo
- Hassan II of Morocco
- Duke Henry of Mecklenburg-Schwerin
- Prince Bernhard of Lippe-Biesterfeld
- Beatrix of the Netherlands
- Olav V of Norway
- Harald V of Norway
- Queen Sonja of Norway
- Heinrich XIV, Prince Reuss Younger Line
- Ferdinand I of Romania
- Michael I of Romania
- Grand Duke Sergei Alexandrovich of Russia
- Ernst I, Duke of Saxe-Altenburg
- Prince August Leopold of Saxe-Coburg and Gotha
- Prince Pedro Augusto of Saxe-Coburg and Gotha
- Charles Augustus, Hereditary Grand Duke of Saxe-Weimar-Eisenach
- Frederick Augustus III of Saxony
- Prince Christian of Schleswig-Holstein
- Milan I of Serbia
- Sultan bin Muhammad Al-Qasimi
- Infante Jaime, Duke of Madrid
- Gustav, Prince of Vasa
- Gustaf V
- Prince Carl, Duke of Västergötland
- Prince Eugen, Duke of Närke
- Gustaf VI Adolf
- Prince Wilhelm, Duke of Södermanland
- Prince Carl Bernadotte
- Prince Gustaf Adolf, Duke of Västerbotten
- Prince Bertil, Duke of Halland
- Queen Silvia of Sweden
- Prince Arthur of Connaught
- Alexander Mountbatten, 1st Marquess of Carisbrooke
- William I of Württemberg
- Mohamed Ennaceur (before 1838)
- Konstantinos Mousouros
- Achille Van Acker
- Porfirio Díaz
- Ernest Krings
- Charles de Gaulle
- William Lyon Mackenzie King
- Camille Gutt
- Sylvain Van de Weyer
- Nursultan Nazarbayev
- Józef Piłsudski
- Baron Pierre Jacques, Grand Marshal of the Royal Court
- Baron Julien Liebaert
- Baron Édouard Descamps
- Baron Victor de Tornaco
- Baron Jean-Jacques Baude
- Count Henri Carton de Wiart, Minister
- Count Edmond Carton de Wiart, Grand Marshal of the Royal Court

== Books ==
- F. Veldekens, Le livre d'or de l'ordre de Léopold et de la croix de fer (Brussels: Lelong, 1858–1861).
