= Order of precedence in Belgium =

Formal ranking used in the Royal court during acts of state

The Belgian order of precedence (French: Liste de préséance en Belgique, Dutch: Lijst van préséance in België) is the formal ranking used at the Royal court during acts of state. Because the EU, NATO and SHAPE all have their headquarters in Belgium, this list is used every year during formal receptions at court.

A distinction is made between Princes of the Royal blood, and Princes of nobility. The same goes for Cardinals who always have precedence, no matter if they are acting as residing bishop. Members of the royal household are given high positions. Many of the people who occupy these positions also have special privileges in Belgium and have the right to use special car number plates.

== List used until 2023 ==
1. HM The King of the Belgians
2. HM The Queen of the Belgians
3. HM King Albert II of the Belgians
4. HM Queen Paola of the Belgians
5. HRH The Duchess of Brabant
6. HRH Prince Gabriel of Belgium
7. HRH Prince Emmanuel of Belgium
8. HRH Princess Eléonore of Belgium
9. HI&RH The Archduchess of Austria-Este, Princess of Belgium
10. HI&RH The Archduke of Austria-Este, Prince of Belgium
11. HI&RH The Hereditary Archduke of Austria-Este, Prince of Belgium
12. HI&RH The Hereditary Archduchess of Austria-Este
13. HI&RH Archduchess Anna Astrid of Austria-Este
14. HI&RH Prince Maximilian of Belgium, Archduke of Austria-Este
15. HI&RH Princess Maria Laura of Belgium, Archduchess of Austria-Este
16. Mr William Isvy
17. HI&RH Prince Joachim of Belgium, Archduke of Austria-Este
18. HI&RH Princess Luisa Maria, Archduchess of Austria-Este
19. HI&RH Princess Laetita Maria, Archduchess of Austria-Este
20. HRH Prince Laurent of Belgium
21. HRH Princess Claire of Belgium
22. HRH Princess Louise of Belgium
23. HRH Prince Nicolas of Belgium
24. HRH Prince Aymeric of Belgium
25. HRH Princess Delphine of Belgium
26. Mr James O'Hare
27. HRH Princess Joséphine of Belgium
28. HRH Princess Léa of Belgium
29. HRH Princess Marie Christine of Belgium, Mrs. Gourgues
30. HRH Princess Marie Esmeralda of Belgium, Lady Moncada
31. Belgian cardinals
32. Dean of the Diplomatic Corps, the Papal Nuncio
33. Ambassadors accredited by the court
34. President of the European Parliament
35. President of the Chamber and the President of the Senate
36. President of the European Council
37. Prime Minister
38. Vice prime ministers
39. Federal ministers
40. President of the European Union
41. Minister for Foreign Affairs (if foreign diplomats are present)
42. President of the European Commission
43. Secretary General of NATO
44. Foreign Minister
45. President of the International Court of Justice in the Hague
46. President of the Court of Justice of the European Union
47. Prosecutor General of the Court of Cassation
48. President of the Constitutional Court
49. Presidents of the Parliaments of the Communities and Regions
50. Minister-Presidents of the Communities and Regions
51. Secretaries of state
52. Grand Marshall of His Majesty the King
53. Vice presidents and members of the European Commission
54. Belgian ministers of state
55. Regional ministers
56. Ladies in waiting of the Queen
57. Judges of the International Criminal Court of The Hague
58. Judges and Clerks of the Court of Justice of the European Union
59. Ambassadors to the European Union
60. Ambassadors to NATO
61. President of the Court of Audit (Rekenhof/Cour des comptes)
62. President of the High Council of Justice
63. Noble families of the Blue Room
64. Dignitaries of the Royal Court
65. HM's Chief of Staff
66. Head of HM's Military Household
67. Intendant of HM's Civil List
68. Chief of the Household of the Royal Princes
69. Honorary chief of staff of His Majesty
70. Honorary intendant of His Majesty's Civil List
71. Honorary head of His Majesty's Military Household
72. Honorary ladies in waiting of the queen
73. President of the Military Committee of NATO
74. Archbishop of Mechelen-Brussels, if not a Cardinal
75. Foreign ambassadors of His Majesty
76. Head of Protocol or the Royal Court
77. Governors of the Provinces
78. Presidents of the Provincial Councils
79. Bishops of the Belgian Church province
80. Commanders in chief of the Supreme Headquarters Allied Powers Europe
81. Aide-de-camp of His Majesty

The official list goes further until 178. Further are mentioned members of parliament, generals, members of the Royal Academies, burgomasters, etc.

== See also ==
- List of grand cordons of the Order of Leopold
- Belgian honours order of wearing

== Sources ==
1. Emmanuel COPPIETERS, Protocol, UGA, Heule, 1988.
2. Pierre-Yves MONETTE, Beroep: Koning der Belgen, 2003
3. Eddy VAN DEN BUSSCHE, Praktisch Handboek voor het Protocol, UGA, Heule, 2008.
4. Eddy VAN DEN BUSSCHE, Manuel pratique pour le protocole, UGA, Heule, 2008.
5. Eddy VAN DEN BUSSCHE, Het Protocol in België - Le Protocole en Belgique, UGA, Heule, 2013.
