= List of protected heritage sites in Chaumont-Gistoux =

This table shows an overview of the protected heritage sites in the Walloon town Chaumont-Gistoux. This list is part of Belgium's national heritage.

Object	Year/architect	Town/section	Address	Coordinates	Number^{?}	Image
Church of Saint-Bavon: choir and tower ^{(nl)} ^{(fr)}		Chaumont-Gistoux		50.678551°N 4.722008°E	25018-CLT-0001-01 Info	Kerk Saint-Bavon: koor en toren
Park "Les Bruyeres" ^{(nl)} ^{(fr)}		Chaumont-Gistoux		50.689828°N 4.700845°E	25018-CLT-0002-01 Info	
The pond and its surrounding area ^{(nl)} ^{(fr)}		Chaumont-Gistoux		50.688308°N 4.692102°E	25018-CLT-0003-01 Info	
Tumuli of Bonlez, two tumuli and surrounding area ^{(nl)} ^{(fr)}		Bonlez Chaumont-Gistoux		50.697216°N 4.707175°E	25018-CLT-0004-01 Info	
Organs of the church Saint-Etienne ^{(nl)} ^{(fr)}		Chaumont-Gistoux		50.661455°N 4.674482°E	25018-CLT-0005-01 Info	
Ensemble of the church of Saint-Martin and the churchyard, the rectory with outbuildings and the wooded park, the buildings of the old farmhouse and the square to which these buildings are aligned ^{(nl)} ^{(fr)}		Chaumont-Gistoux		50.715504°N 4.661063°E	25018-CLT-0006-01 Info	
Ensemble of the chapel of Cheneau and its surroundings ^{(nl)} ^{(fr)}		Chaumont-Gistoux		50.705457°N 4.734997°E	25018-CLT-0007-01 Info	Ensemble van de kapel van Chêneau en zijn omgeving
Chapel of Cheneau ^{(nl)} ^{(fr)}		Chaumont-Gistoux		50.705513°N 4.734861°E	25018-CLT-0008-01 Info	
Organs of the church of Notre-Dame de l'Assomption ^{(nl)} ^{(fr)}		Chaumont-Gistoux		50.702296°N 4.739332°E	25018-CLT-0009-01 Info	
Farm: dovecot, facades and roofs of the barn and the main building with the exception of the old pig shed ^{(nl)} ^{(fr)}		Chaumont-Gistoux	rue de Chaumont, n°34 (M) et les abords (S).	50.698865°N 4.737170°E	25018-CLT-0012-01 Info	
Sunken road formed by the rue de Chaumont and the adjacent slope, from the intersection with the road d'Arnelle up to beyond the farm on No. 34 rue Chaumont ^{(nl)} ^{(fr)}		Chaumont-Gistoux	Longueville	50.692019°N 4.734731°E	25018-CLT-0013-01 Info	
Organ of the church of Notre-Dame de l'Assomption ^{(nl)} ^{(fr)}		Chaumont-Gistoux		50.702296°N 4.739332°E	25018-PEX-0001-01 Info	

== See also ==
- Lists of protected heritage sites in Walloon Brabant
- Chaumont-Gistoux
