= Yasmine Kherbache =

Belgian politician (born 1972)

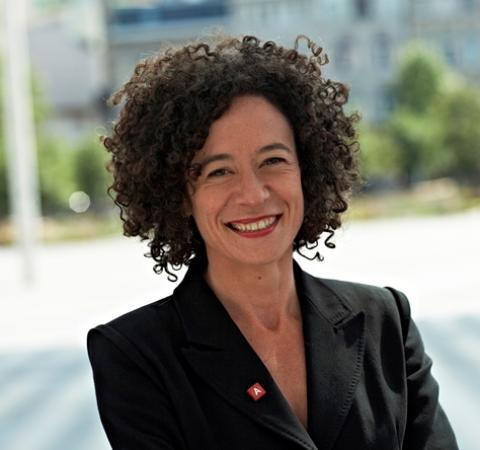

Judge of the Constitutional Court
- Incumbent
- Assumed office 17 December 2019
- Nominated by: Vooruit
- Preceded by: Erik Derycke

Personal details
- Born: 3 April 1972 (age 54)
- Party: Vooruit

Yasmine Kherbache (born 3 April 1972) is a Belgian lawyer and politician who has been serving as a judge of the Constitutional Court since 2019. From June to December 2019, she was a member of the Chamber of Representatives. From 2014 to 2019, she was a member of the Flemish Parliament.
