= Bonlez Castle =

Castle in Wallonia, Belgium

Coordinates: 50.709°N 4.695°E

- Wallonia, Belgium
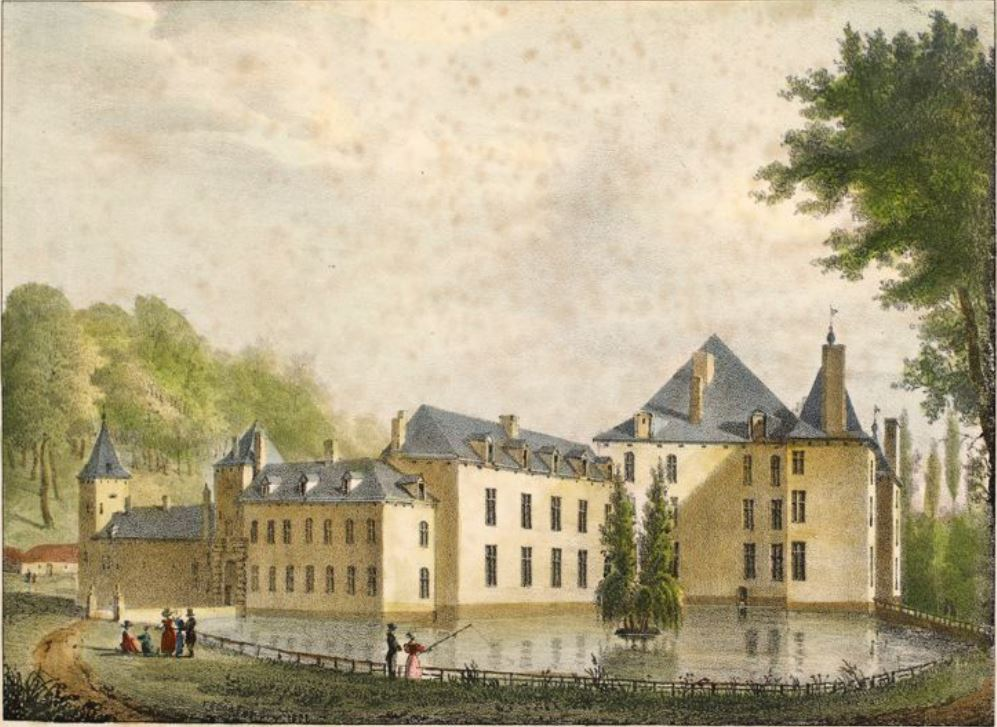
- Bonlez Castle in 1830

Site information
- Type: Castle

Bonlez Castle is a castle in Bonlez in the municipality of Chaumont-Gistoux, Walloon Brabant, Wallonia, Belgium.

== See also ==
- List of castles in Belgium

== Sources ==
- BelgianCastles.br: Bonlez
