= Longueville (Belgium) =

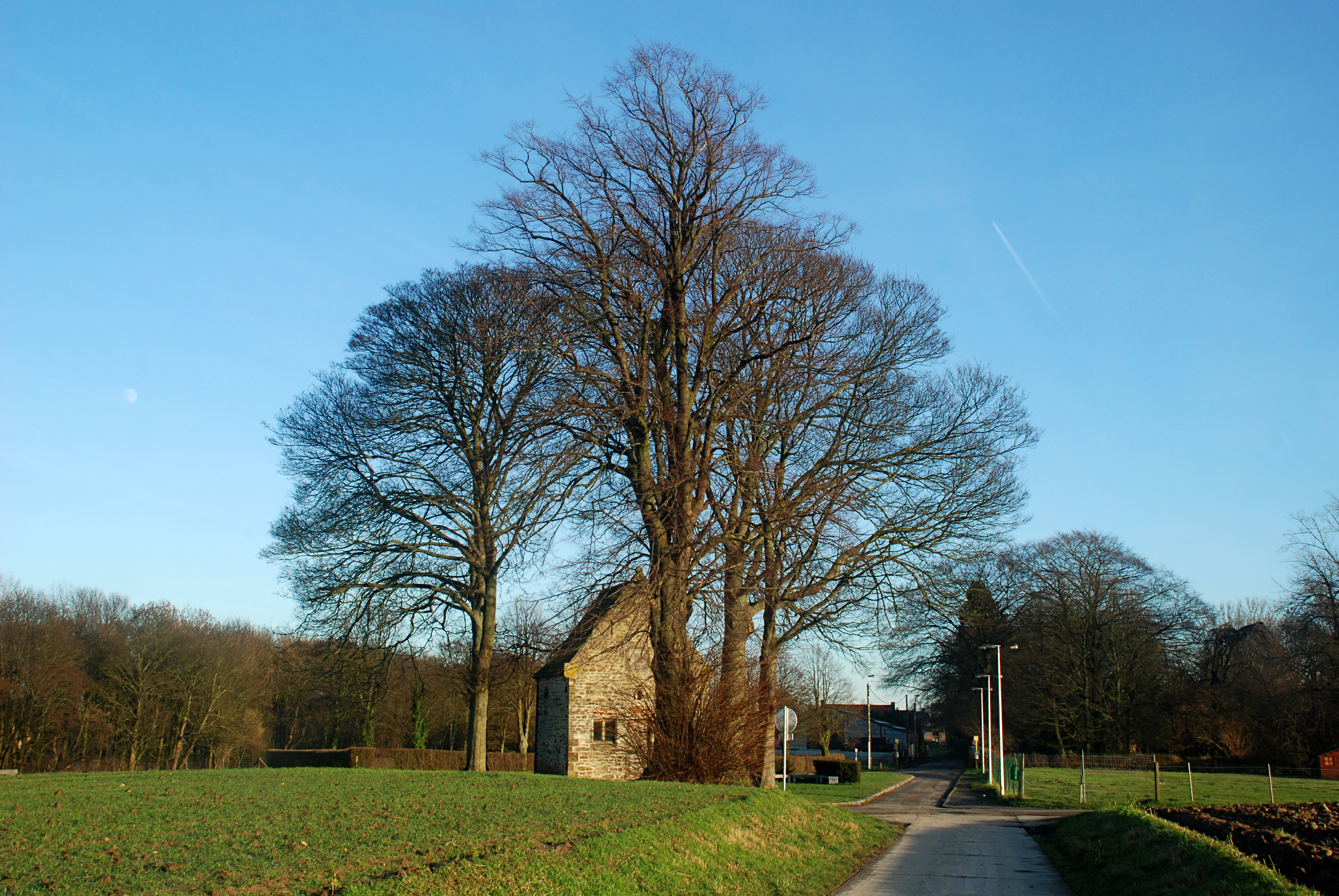
- Longueville, the Chapelle du Chêneau

- Location within Belgium Location within Europe
- Coordinates: 50°42′11″N 04°44′21″E
- Country: Belgium
- Region: Wallonia
- Province: Walloon Brabant
- Municipality: Chaumont-Gistoux

Longueville is a village of and a district of the municipality of Chaumont-Gistoux, located in the province of Walloon Brabant, Belgium.

Longueville has a history that goes back at least to the 13th century, and during the Middle Ages it was a fief which belonged to a succession of religious institutions. The current village church dates from 1769; there is also a chapel at a very old crossroads called Chapelle du Chêneau, that has an old but disputed history. There is also a 19th-century château in Longueville.
