= Jean-Paul Moerman =

Belgian politician and lawyer

- Born: 14 September 1952 (age 74); Tournai, Belgium
- Occupations: politician, lawyer, judge

Jean-Paul Moerman, born on 14 September 1952 in Tournai is a Belgian Walloon politician, member of the Mouvement Réformateur.

He is a master of Laws (ULB, 1975), a lawyer registered at the Mons bar, a former professor at the Cours provinciaux d'administration of Hainaut Province and a member of the board of administrators of Université de Mons-Hainaut. Since 2001, Moerman is a judge at the Belgian Constitutional Court.

Moerman was a lawyer at the bar of Mons from September 1975 to December 2000. He was tasked with significant criminal dossiers in the 1980s and 1990s: the acquittal of the "filière boraine" in May 1988 at the Mons court of assizes (after having obtained the divestment of Nivelles investigating judge Schlicker), affair of the "négriers du centre", etc. As the president of the Parti Socialiste "USC" (Union Socialiste Communale) in Mons, he broke with then-current socialist politics. Before the local elections of 1994, he was ejected from the PS, founded the "Mons, Démocratie et Liberté" list and joined Jean Gol's PRL-FDF. A Royal Decree on 16 May 2001 nominated Moerman as a judge at the Belgian constitutional court.

In 2017 Moerman was proven to have ties with Azerbaijani caviar diplomacy and lobbying for the regime of Azerbaijan. He himself conceded "having fallen in love a bit." Moerman frequently traveled to Azerbaijan and his trips were covered by the Communication Office of Azerbaijan (OCAZ), an organization founded by Alain Destexhe and Stef Goris who are known for promoting Azerbaijani interests in Europe. Moerman is known for his statements in favor of the governing regime of Azerbaijan and criticizing the reports of prominent human rights organizations such as Amnesty International.

Moerman was mentioned as a member of the so-called "Habsburg group", potential lobbyists for Ukraine, in a 21-page filing by U.S. Special Counsel Robert Mueller that was unsealed on 13 June 2018.

== Political career ==
- Belgian federal deputy (PRL) for the Mons electoral district from 21 May 1995 to 21 May 2001.
- Former member of the Mons city council, PRL faction leader.
