= Irène Pétry =

Belgian politician (1922–2007)

Secretary of State for Cooperation and Development
- In office 1973–1973

Deputy for Liège
- In office 1974–1977

Senator for Liège
- In office 1977–1984

President of the Council of the French Community of Belgium
- In office 1980–1982

Judge at the Constitutional Court
- In office 1984–1991

President of the Constitutional Court (Francophone group)
- In office 1991–1992

Personal details
- Born: 19 June 1922 Waremme, Liège, Belgium
- Died: 17 April 2007 (aged 84) Uccle, Brussels-Capital Region, Belgium
- Occupation: Politician

Irène Pétry (19 June 1922 – 17 April 2007) was a Belgian socialist politician. She was the first female president of the Constitutional Court (formerly known as the Court of Arbitration). She took part in founding a movement called the "Femmes Prévoyantes Socialistes". She was one of the first women to pursue a political career that took her to the highest levels. The main idea for which she fought her whole life was the equality and emancipation of man and woman.

== Youth ==
Irene Pétry grew up with five brothers in a working-class family. Her parents were fervent members of the Belgian Workers Party, ancestor of the Parti Socialiste. She was involved in politics from an early age, and participated in local meetings of this party. Irene was a good student and managed to finish her economics degree at the Royal Athenaeum of Waremme in 1942. She was forced to interrupt her studies because of World War II and for lack of money. As a substitute for university education she attended socialist popular education circles, took language courses and participated in conferences.

== Femmes Prévoyantes Socialistes (FPS) ==
Irène Pétry began work as a private employee in a company located in Liège. Later, after the war, she joined the Socialist Mutuality in her hometown of Waremme, where she developed a section called "Femmes Prévoyantes Socialistes" (Forward-looking Socialist Women). This group was located at the Joseph Wauters Clinic, also in Waremme. Today it is a medical analysis laboratory. The Femmes Prévoyantes Socialistes (FPS) movement has evolved greatly since the time when Irene Pétry inaugurated it. Today, this movement prioritizes the equality of men and women (fighting wage inequality and the issue of part-time work). The FPS movement also militates for the rights of citizens (voluntary termination of pregnancy, fight against insecurity) while conducting prevention campaigns with the aim of raising citizens' awareness about the fight against domestic violence, prevention of bulimia and anorexia, and screening for breast cancer. In this way, the movement fights for an egalitarian society with specific political demands. After the establishment of the FPS movement, Irene Pétry was its National Secretary for French-speakers for nearly 30 years (1953 to 1982).

At the same time, she had other duties. She was the editor-in-chief of a monthly magazine published called La Femme Prévoyante, and she was one of the presenters of the television program "La pensée socialiste" (Socialist Thought) at RTBF.

Irene Pétry's political commitment did not stop with the FPS movement. She also agitated for women's rights. As early as the 1950s, she fought for economic and legal gender equality. Later, in the 1960s, she emphasized the development and growth of more and more family planning centers. She continued to advance, and in the 1970s militated for decriminalizing abortion prior to legalizing it. However she chose to take a step back when faced with "extremist" feminist groups that emerged in the 1970s.

== Political career ==
From 1959 to 1964 Irène Pétry was a communal councilor in Uccle. In 1966, she became vice-president and then president of the International Council of Women of the Socialist International. Subsequently, she was appointed Vice President of the Socialist International. The Socialist International Women is the international organization of women's organizations of socialist, social democratic and labor parties affiliated to the Socialist International.

Meanwhile, in the late sixties, Irene found herself involved in government, without being a member of parliament. In the early seventies, she joined the office of the Socialist Party. At the beginning of 1973 she became the Secretary of State for Development Cooperation. She performed this function in the Leburton-Tindemans-De Clercq government for a period of 10 months. She also became deputy to the Federal Public Service Foreign Affairs Minister at the time, Renaat Van Elslande, a Belgian politician of the Flemish Social Christian Party (Christen-Democratisch en Vlaams). Renaat Van Elslande served as Minister for Foreign Affairs from 1973 to 1977. Irene was thus the first socialist woman to hold a ministerial office in Belgium.

Irène then ran for election for Liège (where she resided at the time) in the March 1974 legislative elections, where she was elected as a deputy. In October 1976, following the fusion of the Belgian municipalities, she became communal councilor at Sprimont, for a period of 7 years (from 1977 to 1984). A few months later, she was elected to the Senate. The president of the Senate at that time was Pierre Harmel from the PSC (Centre démocrate humaniste) between 1973 and 1977. Irène Pétry had some responsibility for the institutional evolution of the state, since she was a directly elected senator. She was rapporteur of the Senate Committee that was defining new structures that would ultimately be adopted by the Belgian state. In August 1976 she gave her voice to the majority which gave birth, among other things, to the political structure of Wallonia.

From 15 October 1976, she participated in the meetings that inaugurated the Walloon Regional Council. Among the hundred or so members of this assembly, she was one of eight women parliamentarians from Wallonia. During the same period, in 1978 she created a political association called "Socialist Tribunes" with Ernest Glinne and Jacques Yerna. This is a left-leaning Walloon association. Irène Pétry was also a member of the French Community of Belgium from 1974. In 1980 she became the seventh president of the Cultural Council of the French Community when she succeeded Léon Hurez. She was the first woman to be president. She was president until October 1982. She was reelected as senator in 1981, holding office until September 1984, this time for Namur.

Finally, Irene Pétry became a judge at the Court of Arbitration as early as the 1980s. Belgium, which was at that time unitary, took the path towards federalism in 1970. The Court of Arbitration was created after the constitutional revision of 1980, renamed from 7 May 2007 the Constitutional Court. It was born in September 1984 and Irène Pétry was designated by the Socialist Party to represent it. After this, she abandoned her various political mandates to devote herself fully to her new task. She took over from Jean Sarot as President of the French Court of Arbitration from 19 February 1991. She also held the general presidency until 1992.

Irene Pétry was appointed Minister of State in May 1992. Although this title does not give any particular rights, it recognizes great services rendered to the country and the status of a "wise person". At the end of a political career it is more than a reward, it is a consecration. On 20 June 1992 she chose to end her activities at the Court of Arbitration. She was then 70 years old.

== Some writings ==
Irène Pétry wrote two articles for the feminist periodical Les Cahiers du GRIF. In 1974 it published an issue with the theme "The social insecurity of women" where she wrote Inflation and the impossibility of predicting and Housing and the impossibility of settling.

Some quotes from Irène Pétry:

Too often, it is need that drives women to work and all of them are still needed at home.

— Irène Pétry

What makes our feminine mutuality a living, dynamic and flourishing women's movement is its tireless action in the social, educational and advocacy fields.

— Irène Pétry

It has never been said that the man who wanted to devote himself to his role as a father should not be prevented from doing so for economic reasons.

— Irène Pétry

== Sources ==
- Delforge, P.; Destatte, P.; Libon, M. (2000), Encyclopédie du Mouvement wallon, vol. IVParlementaires et ministres de la Wallonie (1974-2009), Charleroi: Institut Destrée, EMW-T4
- Delforge, P. (December 2014), "Irène Pétry", PortailWallonie.be, archived from the original on 2017-12-01
- Delfosse, L. (7 June 1989), "Irène Pétry, juge à la Cour d'Arbitrage", LeSoir.be
- "Éloge funèbre de Mme Irène Pétry, ministre d'État", Sénat de Belgique: Annales, sessions ordinaires 2007-2008 (in French) (3-216 26 avril 2007 séance de l'après-midi), 2007
- François, J. (6 December 2013), "Irène Pétry, juge (Waremme-Belgique)", Chronique-Waremme.be (in French), archived from the original on 20 December 2017
- "Irène Pétry", le site de la bibliothèque de l'Université de Liège, collections ULg, ULG library (in French)
- Julémont, G. (2008), Femmes prévoyantes socialistes: des combats d'hier aux enjeux de demain, Bruxelles: FPS, p. 74, Julemont2008
- "La Belgique, un Etat fédéral", le portail des institutions belges (in French)
- Le site du centre hospitalier Bois de l'Abbaye (in French)
- Pétry, Irène (1974a), "L'inflation et l'impossibilité de prévoir", Les Cahiers du GRIF, 4 (4 L'insécurité sociale des femmes): 46–49, doi:10.3406/grif.1974.941, Pétry-Inflation
- Pétry, Irène (1974b), "Le logement et l'impossibilité de s'installer", Les Cahiers du GRIF (in French), 4 (4 L'insécurité sociale des femmes): 50–53, doi:10.3406/grif.1974.942, Pétry-Logement
- Schoune, C. (18 April 2007), "Elle incarna la voix des femmes", LeSoir.be (in French)
- Site de l'Internationale socialiste des Femmes (in French)
- site officiel des Femmes Prévoyantes (in French)
