= Yves de Wasseige =

Belgian politician (1926–2021)

Member of the Senate of Belgium
- In office 1979–1991

Personal details
- Born: 13 May 1926 Auvelais, Belgium
- Died: 2 August 2021 (aged 95) Marcinelle, Belgium
- Party: PS; RW

Yves de Wasseige (13 May 1926 – 2 August 2021) was a Belgian politician and economist.

== Biography ==
De Wasseige served in the 10th Notre Dame de Fontgalland scout unit during World War II. He was a volunteer for the entire war and celebrated the Liberation of Belgium in 1944. He earned a degree in economics from the Catholic University of Leuven in 1951 and subsequently worked at a Hainaut-Sambre steel plant from 1958 to 1975. He then became a business delegate for the Mouvement ouvrier chrétien and was also a member of the Esprit group, where several political analysts of different views met in Wallonia and Brussels, such as François Perin.

=== Political engagement ===
De Wasseige was engaged in several Walloon political movements, such as the Mouvement populaire wallon and Rénovation wallonne. In 1975, he left the steel plant to become chief of staff for Minister of Economic Affairs André Oleffe. After Oleffe's death, he held the same position for Fernand Herman. After that, he served as a general delegate engineer for the General Commissariat for Atomic Energy from 1977 to 1979 before being elected Senator as a member of the Walloon Rally. The next year, he became secretary general of the party, replacing Joseph Fiévez. Under his leadership, he resisted the party's tendencies to join DéFI in forming coalitions, advocating for its independence. He then co-founded the Rassemblement populaire wallon, which presented itself as a section of the Socialist Party. He was re-elected Senator in 1981, 1985, and 1987 before reaching the term limit set by the Socialist Party, and did not stand for re-election in 1991. He sat as a judge on the Constitutional Court from 1992 to 1994 before his resignation.

=== Economic engagement ===
Yves de Wasseige was well known for his work as an economist and political analyst, publishing an economic manual titled Comprendre l'économie politique, which was republished multiple times by Éditions Couleur livres. The book still serves as the basis of the entrance examination of the Faculty of Economics at the Catholic University of Leuven. He also wrote numerous articles for Esprit and the Center for socio-political research and information. In 1978, he launched a restructuring plan for the steel industry in Wallonia.

=== Death ===
Yves de Wasseige died in Marcinelle on 2 August 2021 at the age of 95.

== Publications ==
- Comprendre l'économie politique
- Effet de serre, nucléaire, fusion froide... (1989)
- Sur le modèle social européen (2007)
- L’ACROnique du nucléaire (2017)
- En cours de route : souvenirs d'un militant
