= Étienne Cerexhe =

Belgian politician and judge (1931–2020)

Baron Étienne Cerexhe

Member of the Senate
- In office 1985–1987
- Monarch: Badouin I

Member of the Chamber of Representatives
- In office 1988–1991
- Monarch: Baudouin I
- Parliamentary group: Christian Social Party

Personal details
- Born: 18 April 1931 Schaerbeek, Belgium
- Died: 24 June 2020 (aged 89)
- Party: Christian Social Party
- Children: Benoît Cerexhe
- Education: Université catholique de Louvain; University of Paris

Baron Étienne Cerexhe (18 April 1931 – 24 June 2020) was a Belgian judge and academic. He was a member of the Belgian Senate from 1985 to 1987, and the Chamber of Representatives from 1988 to 1991. In 2009, Cerexhe was knighted by King Albert II.

== Personal life and death ==
Cerexhe was born on 18 April 1931 in Schaerbeek, Belgium. He had degrees from the Université catholique de Louvain and the University of Paris. Cerexhe had honorary doctorates from the University of Lisbon, University of Ouagadougou and University of Santiago. He was the father of Belgian politician and mayor of Woluwe-Saint-Pierre Benoît Cerexhe.

Cerexhe died on 24 June 2020 at the age of 89. His death was announced the following day, and his funeral was held on 30 June in Woluwe-Saint-Pierre.

== Career ==
=== Academic career ===
In 1967, Cerexhe and Pierre Maon founded the Faculty of Law at the Université de Namur. From 1967 to 1988, Cerexhe was dean of the faculty. He was also a lecturer at the Université catholique de Louvain. In 1974, he was a co-founder of the Faculty of Law (also known as the École Supérieure de Droit de Ouagadougou) at the University of Ouagadougou in Burkina Faso. In 1984, he helped set up the Centre for European Policy Studies in Brussels.

=== Political career ===
From 1985 to 1987, Cerexhe was a senator during the 47th legislature of the House of Representatives. From 1988 to 1991, he sat in the Chamber of Representatives, representing the Christian Social Party (PSC). During his time, Cerexhe proposed a bill on constitutional reform that supported federal loyalty, a concept in use in Germany. This was later a part of Belgium's wider 1993 constitutional reforms. He was supportive of the Lomé Convention, and believed that it did not contribute to African poverty. Cerexhe was involved in providing humanitarian aid. He was a supporter of equality and recognition for all of Belgium's federal communities and regions.

In 1993, Cerexhe became a judge in the Court of Arbitration (now called the Constitutional Court), as one of their French language judges. He specialised in public, European and civil law. In April 2001, he retired and was given the title of judge emeritus. He was also made an honorary consul of the Wallonia region to Burkina Faso. Cerexhe was also president of the Belgian section of the Institut international de Droit d'Expression et d'inspiration Françaises.

== Honours ==
In 2009, Cerexhe was knighted by King Albert II. He was given the title of baron.

== Works ==
- Cerexhe, Étienne, Tourisme et intégration européenne (Tourism and European integration), 1985
- Cerexhe, Étienne, Snyers, Anne-Marie, Le droit européen : les objectifs et les institutions (European law: objectives and institutions), 1989 ISBN 2803800160
