= Marc Bossuyt =

Belgian professor

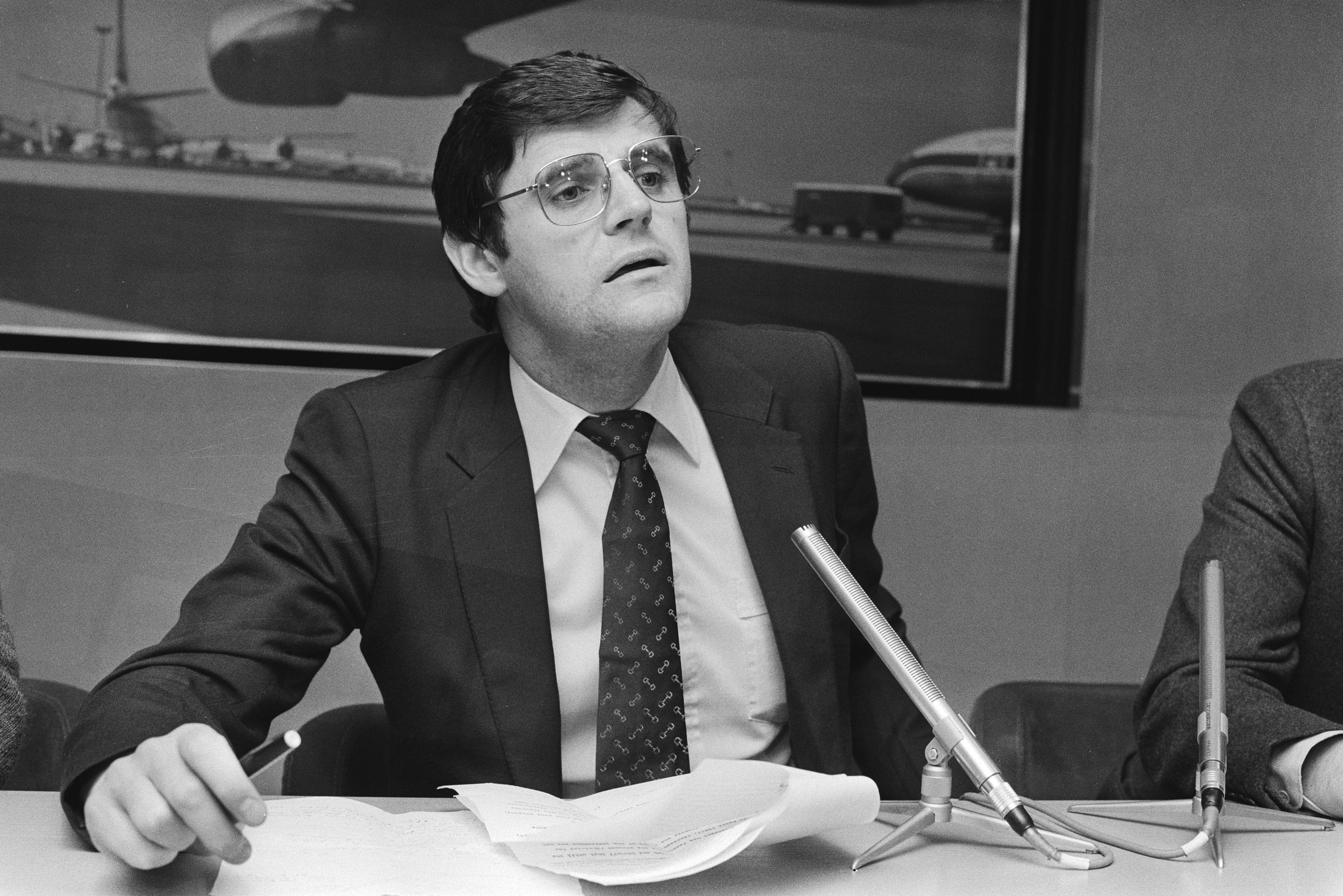
Marc Bossuyt (1983)

Marc, Baron Bossuyt (born 9 January 1944 in Ghent) is a member of the Permanent Court of Arbitration in The Hague and a former judge and president at the Belgian Constitutional Court.

Bossuyt obtained a Dr.iur (LLM) at the University of Ghent in 1968, a Certificate of international relations at Johns Hopkins University in Bologna in 1969, and a PhD in political science from the Graduate Institute of International Studies in 1975. He is professor emeritus of international law at the University of Antwerp.

He was appointed to the Constitutional Court by Royal Order on 28 January 1997. From 9 October 2007 until his retirement Bossuyt was the President of the Dutch linguistic group of the Constitutional Court of Belgium. He was ennobled as a baron in the 2009 honours list. Upon reaching the mandatory retirement age of 70 years, Bossuyt retired from the Court and became President-Emeritus.

Bossuyt was a member of the UN Committee on the Elimination of Racial Discrimination (2000–2003, 2014–present).

In 2020, Marc Bossuyt was appointed as the president of the steering committee of the Turkey Tribunal, which is an independent "people's tribunal" registered as an NGO in Belgium.

== Honours ==
- 2013: Grand Cordon in the Order of Leopold
- 2007: Knight Grand Cross in the Order of the Crown.
