= André Alen =

Belgian jurist and judge

André, Baron Alen (born in Assent, 25 September 1950) has been a judge on the Constitutional Court of Belgium since 16 March 2001. He was also an associate professor at KU Leuven, where he taught constitutional law. He has been professor emeritus since 1 October 2015. Alen obtained a Licentiate in Law in 1973 and became Doctor of Law in 1983, both at this same university. From 9 January 2014 to 1 February 2016, Alen was President of the Constitutional Court.
