= Bonlez =

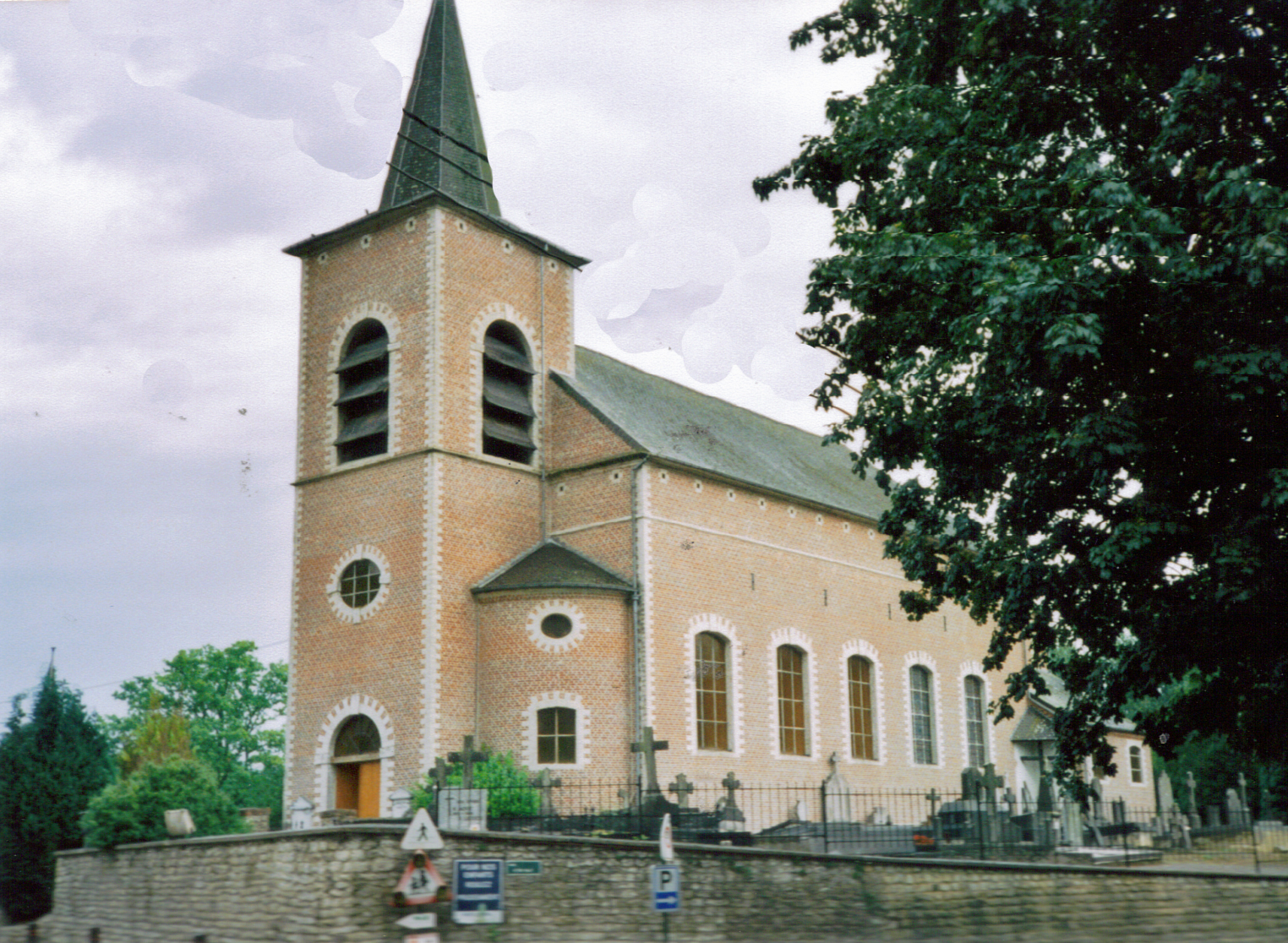
- Bonlez, the village church

- Location within Belgium Location within Europe
- Coordinates: 50°42′00″N 04°41′00″E
- Country: Belgium
- Region: Wallonia
- Province: Walloon Brabant
- Municipality: Chaumont-Gistoux

Bonlez is a village of Wallonia and a district of the municipality of Chaumont-Gistoux, located in the province of Walloon Brabant, Belgium.

The locality has been settled at least since the Bronze Age. The first written mention of the village dates from the Middle Ages. Bonlez Castle is located in Bonlez; the village church is also a historical building, dating in its current appearance largely from 1771, when it was rebuilt according to a design by Laurent-Benoît Dewez. Inside, it contains furnishings from the 15th to 17th centuries.
