= Erik Derycke (politician) =

Flemish politician, lawyer, minister and emeritus judge

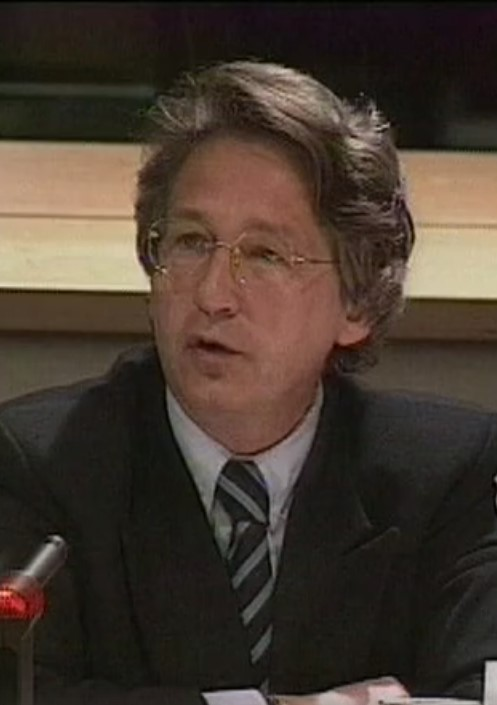
- Born: 28 October 1949 (age 76); Waregem, West Flanders
- Occupations: politician, lawyer, judge

Erik A. N. Derycke (born 28 October 1949) is a Flemish socialist politician, lawyer, former minister and an emeritus judge at the Constitutional Court of Belgium.

Derycke was awarded a licence in law by the Ghent University in 1972. With the Flemish socialists (today Flemish social-democratic party) he was a municipal council member in Waregem (1988–2001), member of the provincial council of West Flanders (1978–1984), and a member of the Federal Parliament (1984–2001).

He was state secretary for the research policy (1990), and later state secretary and minister for development cooperation (1991). Within the first cabinet of Jean-Luc Dehaene he was state secretary for development cooperation (1991–1995). From 1995 to 1999 he was the Belgian minister of foreign affairs. He left politics upon being appointed to the then Belgian Court of Arbitration on 10 August 2001. He retired from the Court, since 2007 reformed as the Constitutional Court, in October 2019 upon reaching the mandatory retirement age of 70.
