= Constitutional Court (Belgium) =

Federal constitutional court of Belgium

Coordinates: 50.8419°N 4.3603°E

- Cour constitutionnelle Grondwettelijk Hof Verfassungsgerichthof
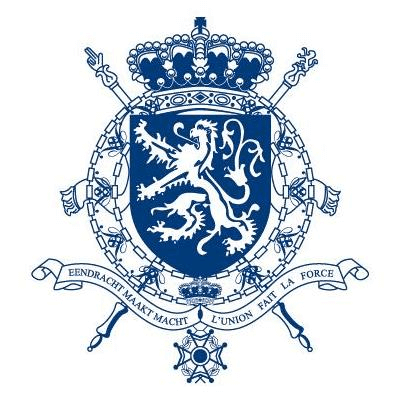
- Established: 1980
- Language: French, Dutch, German
- Website: https://en.const-court.be/

The Constitutional Court (Dutch: Grondwettelijk Hof; French: Cour constitutionelle; German: Verfassungsgerichtshof) is the federal constitutional court of Belgium. It was founded in 1980 and its jurisdiction was augmented in 1988 and 2003.

== History ==
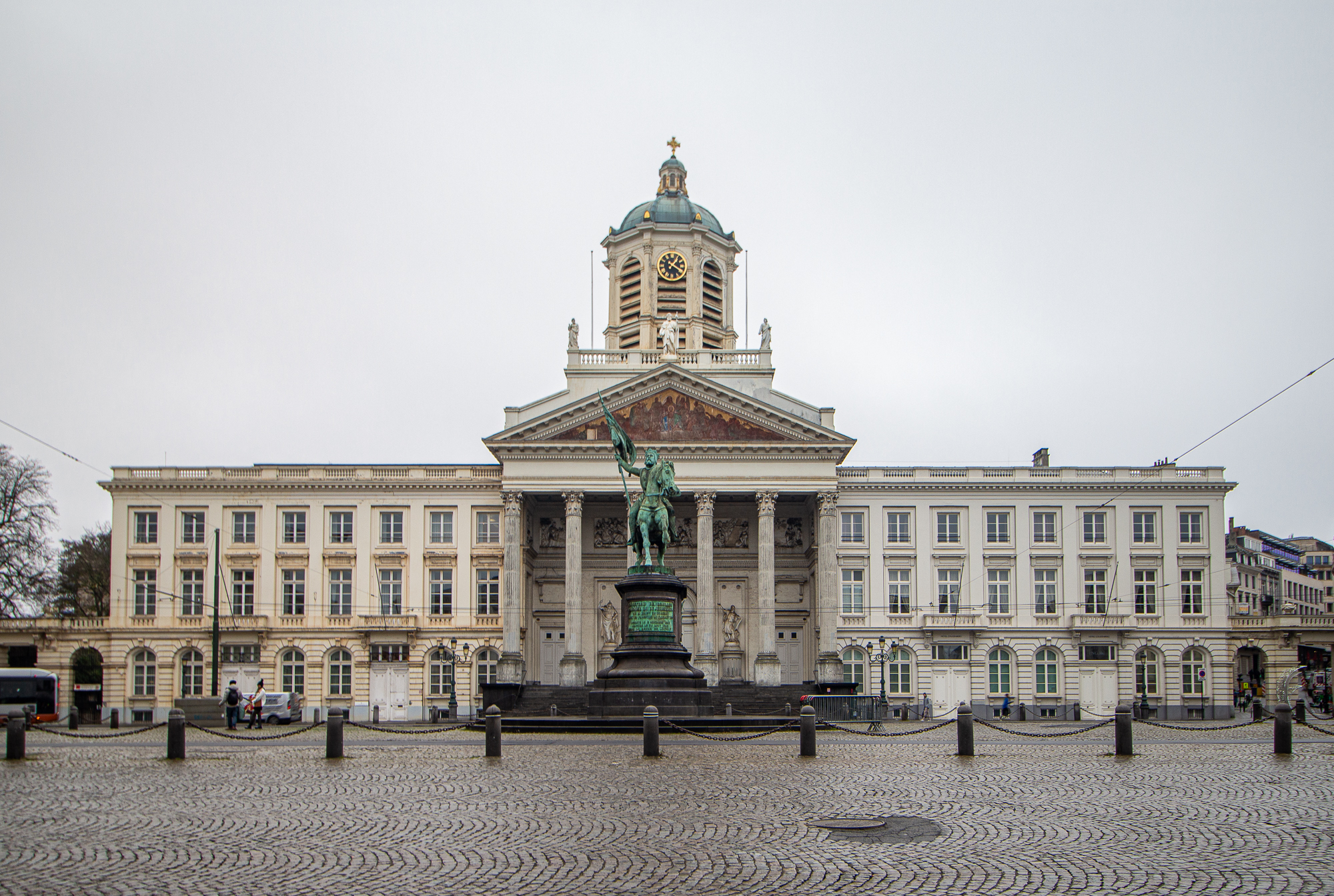
View on the Place Royale / Koningsplein; the Constitutional Court of Belgium (left) is adjacent to the Church of St. James on Coudenberg.

Founded as the Court of Arbitration in 1980, the court owes its existence to the transition of the Belgian unitary state into a federal state. Its mission is to supervise the observance of the constitutional division of powers between the federal state, the communities and the regions.

The Court of Arbitration was officially inaugurated in the Belgian Senate on 1 October 1984. On 5 April 1985, it delivered its first judgment. In May 2007, upon a change of the Belgian Constitution, the court was renamed Constitutional Court as this name is more in keeping with the actual jurisdiction of the court.

== Jurisdiction ==
Since 1988, the Court is also responsible for supervising the application of some particular articles of the Belgian constitution such as the principles of equality, non-discrimination and the rights and liberties in respect of education (the Articles 10, 11, and 24 of the Belgian constitution). With a special law of 2003, this competence was expanded to the Section II (Articles 8 to 32), and the Articles 170, 172, and 191 of the Belgian Constitution. The Court is therefore developing into a constitutional court.

The court has two modi operandi. Each stakeholder can within 6 months of publication of a law, decree or ordinance go to the Court in order to have the law, decree or ordinance annulled because of a breach of the aforementioned Articles of the Belgian Constitution or because of a breach of the division of powers between the federal state, the communities and the regions. When the Court decides to annul a law, decree or ordinance it counts erga omnes, for all persons.

The second modus operandi of the court are the preliminary issues. If a question comes up in a particular tribunal about the correspondence of laws, decrees and ordinances with the rules laying down the division of powers between the State, the communities and the regions or with Articles 8 to 32, 170, 172, or 191 of the Constitution, that tribunal must address a preliminary question to the Constitutional Court as the Court has the exclusive competence of interpreting the Constitution and the competence dividing rules. When the Court finds a breach of these articles, it will pronounce its decision inter partes, meaning the ruling has effect only between the parties of the specific case. Such a judgement, however, has great moral value and will force the parliament which made the targeted law, decree or ordinance in question to amend it.

== Judges ==
The Court is composed of 12 judges (2 linguistic groups of which 6 Dutch and 6 French speakers, one of them must have an adequate knowledge of German) appointed for their lifetime by the King (in practice, the federal government) within a list of candidates provided by the federal parliament. The list to fill a vacancy contains two candidates proposed alternately by the Chamber of Representatives and the Senate by a majority of at least two-thirds of the members present. Each linguistic group is composed of three judges with a legal background and three judges who have had at least five years experience as members of parliament. Candidates must be at least forty years of age. The judges may hold office until they reach seventy years of age, when they retire from the bench.

Currently six of the twelve judges are female. According to a change in 2014 to article 12 of the special law, the membership of the court needs to contain a measure of gender equality: at least a third of its membership needs to be of the opposite sex. Until that number is reached, new appointments are legally obliged to be of the underrepresented sex. However, this obligation has not been respected when Michel Pâques was appointed in 2018.

=== Composition ===
The Court is currently composed as follows:

French linguistic group:
- Pierre Nihoul, President
- Thierry Giet
- Michel Pâques
- Emmanuelle Bribosia
- Kattrin Jadin
- Magali Plovie
Dutch linguistic group:
- Josephine Moerman, President
- Yasmine Kherbache
- Sabine de Bethune
- Willem Verrijdt
- Frank Fleerackers
- Wouter Pas

=== Judges' background ===
- Bribosia (b. 1971) is a law professor at the ULB
- de Bethune (b. 1958) is a former member of the Belgian Senate (1995-2021) and of the Flemish Parliament (2014-2019)
- Fleerackers (b. 1961) is a law professor at the KUL
- Giet (b. 1958) is a former member of the Chamber of Representatives (1995-2013)
- Jadin (b. 1980) is a former Member of the Chamber of Representatives (2007-2022)
- Kherbache (b. 1972) is a former member of the Flemish Parliament (2014-2019) and the Chamber of Representatives (2019)
- Moerman, JP. (b. 1952) is a former Member of the Chamber of Representatives (1995-2001)
- Moerman, J. (b. 1958) is a former member of parliament, federal minister of Economy, Energy, Foreign Trade and Scientific Research (2003-2004), and viceminister-president of the Flemish government and Flemish minister of Economy, Scientific Research, Innovation, and Foreign Trade (2004-2007)
- Nihoul (b. 1961) is a former judge at the Council of State
- Pâques (b. 1959) is a former judge at the Council of State
- Pas (b. 1968) is a former judge at the Council of State
- Plovie (b. 1976) is a former member of the Parliament of the Brussels-Capital Region (2012-2014, 2017-2023)
- Verrijdt (b. 1981) is a former referendaris ("law clerk") at the Constitutional Court

=== Former judges ===
French linguistic group:
- Etienne Gutt (1984-1989) †
- Jean Sarot (1984-1990) †
- Irène Pétry (1984-1992) †
- Jacques Wathelet (1984-1992) †
- Dieudonné André (1984-1993) †
- Michel Melchior (1984-2010) †
- Lucien François (1989-2004)
- Paul Martens (1990-2010) †
- Yves de Wasseige (1992-1994)
- Baroness Janine Delruelle-Ghobert (1992-2001)
- Baron Étienne Cerexhe (1993-2001)
- Roger Henneuse (1995-2013) †
- Jean-Paul Moerman (2001-2022)
- Jean-Paul Snappe (2001-2019)
- Jean Spreutels (2004-2018) †
- François Daoût (2011-2021) †
- Thierry Detienne (2020-2023)
Dutch linguistic group:
- Baron Jan Delva (1984-1993) †
- Willy Calewaert (1984-1986)
- Fernand Debaedts (1984-1993) †
- Louis De Grève (1984-1994) †
- Karel Blanckaert (1984-1994)
- Baron Louis-Paul Suetens (1984-1996)
- Rik Boel (1986-2001) †
- Georges De Baets (1993-2001) †
- Henri Coremans (1993-2000)
- Alex Arts (1994-2007) †
- Baron Marc Bossuyt (1997-2014) †
- Etienne De Groot (1999-2018) †
- Erik Derycke (2001-2019)
- Baron André Alen (2001-2020) †
- Luc Lavrysen (2001-2026) †
- Trees Merckx-Van Goey (2007-2021)
- Rita Leysen (2014-2022)
- Danny Pieters (2021-2026)

† denotes that judge served as President of his linguistic group

== Procedure ==
An appeal to cancel a law, decree or ordinance may be submitted to the Court by the Council of Ministers, by the Government of a Community or Region of Belgium, by the Presidents of the Chamber of Representatives, Senate and the Community and Regional Parliaments, at the request of two thirds of its members, and by any person who can demonstrate an interest in the cancellation. In other words, the law, decree or ordinance must be harmful to the party submitting the appeal.

Cases before the Constitutional Court are normally heard by a panel consisting of seven judges that decides by majority. The panel always comprises both Presidents, at least three judges from each linguistic group, at least two former members of the Federal Parliament and at least two judges with a legal background. Cases can also be heard by the whole Court if either President so decides or if at least two judges of the ordinary panel of seven judges so requests. If cases are heard by the whole Court, the Court cannot rule unless at least 10 judges and an equal number of Dutch- and French-speaking judges are present. In this case, if the votes are equally divided, the President of the Court has a casting vote.

The appeal must include the subject of the appeal and must be motivated. The party submitting the appeal can also request that the law, decree or ordinance in question be suspended pending a final ruling by the Court. A law, decree or ordinance can be suspended only when the application of the law, decree or ordinance in question could incur serious, and difficult to repair, harm to the party submitting the appeal.

== See also ==
- Communities, regions and provinces of Belgium
- Constitution of Belgium
- Judiciary
- Politics of Belgium
- Rule According to Higher Law
- Rule of law
