= Louis De Grève =

Belgian politician (1929–2021)

Member of the Chamber of Representatives of Belgium
- In office 1977–1984
- Constituency: Arrondissement of Brussels

Member of the Senate of Belgium
- In office 1974–1977

Schepen of Halle
- In office 1976–1982

Mayor of Halle
- In office 1965–1971

Member of the Flemish Council
- In office 21 October 1980 – September 1984

Personal details
- Born: 17 October 1929 Halle, Belgium
- Died: 12 May 2021 (aged 91) Halle
- Party: PVV

Louis De Grève (17 October 1929 – 12 May 2021) was a Belgian politician.

== Biography ==
De Grève held a doctorate of law before becoming a politician. In 1958, he was elected to the Municipal Council of Halle, holding this position until 1984. He served as Schepen of the city from 1976 to 1982 and was Mayor from 1965 to 1971. He was also a Provincial Council member for Brabant from 1977 to 1984.

A member of the Party for Freedom and Progress, De Grève served in the Senate from 1974 to 1977 for the Arrondissement of Brussels and represented the same district in the Chamber of Representatives from 1977 to 1984. From April 1974 to October 1980, he sat on the Cultural Council for the Dutch Cultural Community. He then sat on the Flemish Council from 21 October 1980 to September 1984, chairing his party's faction for the majority of his term.

De Grève was appointed a judge to the Constitutional Court, where he remained until 16 October 1999. On 14 September 1993, he succeeded Fernand Debaedts as chairman of the Dutch-speaking group on the Court. He himself was succeeded in this position by Georges De Baets.

Louis De Grève died on 12 May 2021 at the age of 91.
