= Princess Claire of Belgium =

Belgian princess (born 1974)

Princess Claire
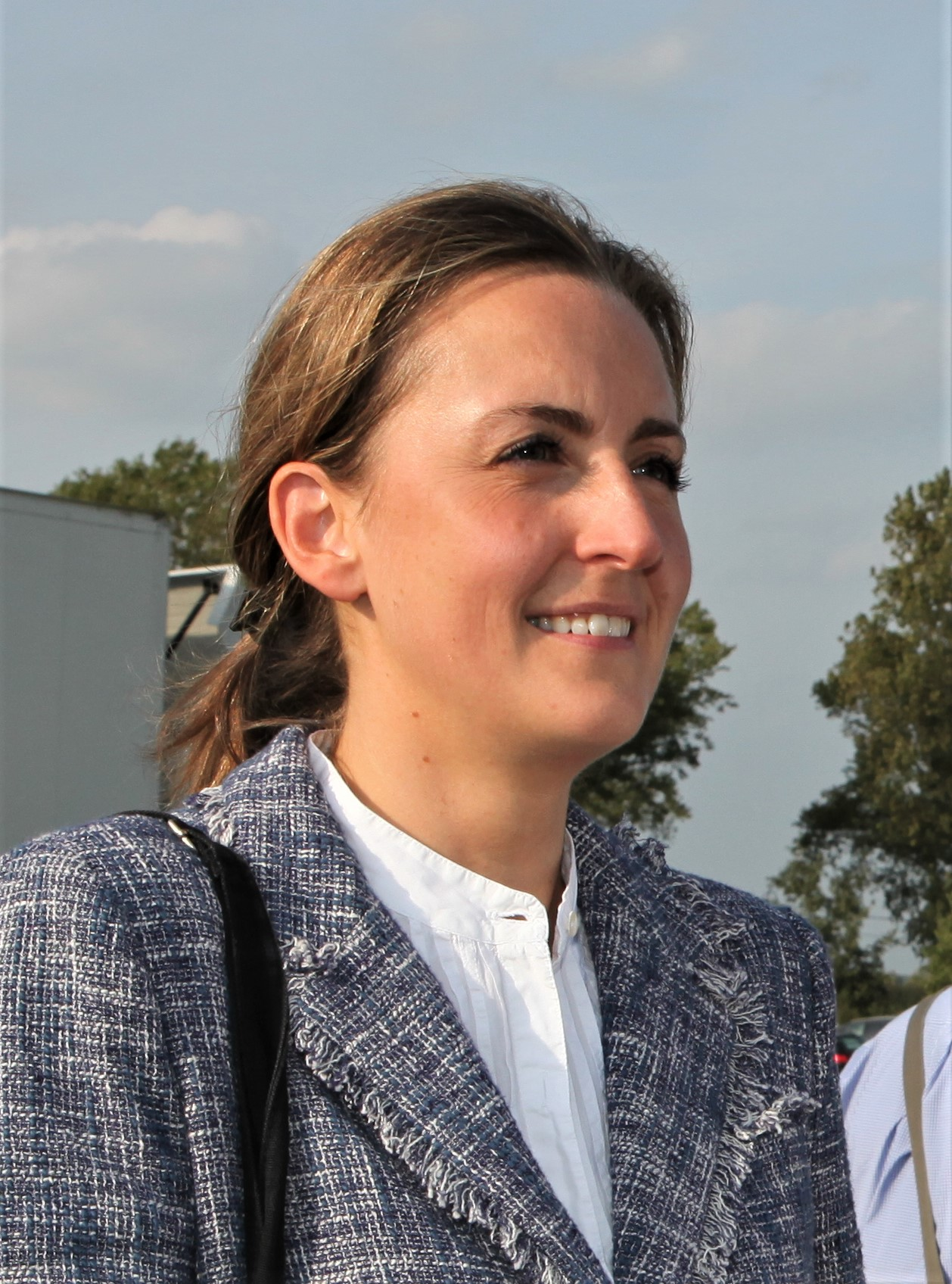
- Princess Claire in 2011
- Born: Claire Louise Coombs; 18 January 1974 (age 52); Bath, Somerset, England
- Spouse: Prince Laurent of Belgium (m. 2003)
- Issue: Princess Louise; Prince Nicolas; Prince Aymeric
- Father: Nicholas John Coombs
- Mother: Nicole Mertens

Princess Claire of Belgium (born Claire Louise Coombs; 18 January 1974) is a British-Belgian land surveyor. She has been married to Prince Laurent since 2003 and is the sister-in-law of King Philippe of Belgium.

== Early life ==
She is the daughter of Nicholas John Coombs (1938-2026), a British-born businessman, and his Belgian wife, Nicole Eva Gabrielle Thérèse Mertens (Ixelles, 20 June 1951). She has an elder sister, Joanna, and a younger brother, Matthew. In 1977, when she was three years old, her family relocated to Dion-le-Val near Brussels in francophone Wallonia.

== Marriage and children ==
On 12 April 2003, she married Prince Laurent of Belgium, the second son and youngest child of the King Albert II of Belgium and Queen Paola of Belgium. The civil ceremony was held at Brussels Town Hall, and the religious ceremony at the Cathedral of St. Michael and St. Gudula.

The couple have three children:

- Princess Louise Sophie Mary, (born 6 February 2004) at Saint Luc University Hospital in Woluwe-Saint-Lambert.
- Prince Nicolas Casimir Marie, (born 13 December 2005) (twin) at Saint Luc University Hospital in Woluwe-Saint-Lambert.
- Prince Aymeric Auguste Marie, (born 13 December 2005) (twin) at Saint Luc University Hospital in Woluwe-Saint-Lambert.

The family live in Villa Clementine, in Tervuren.

== Public life ==
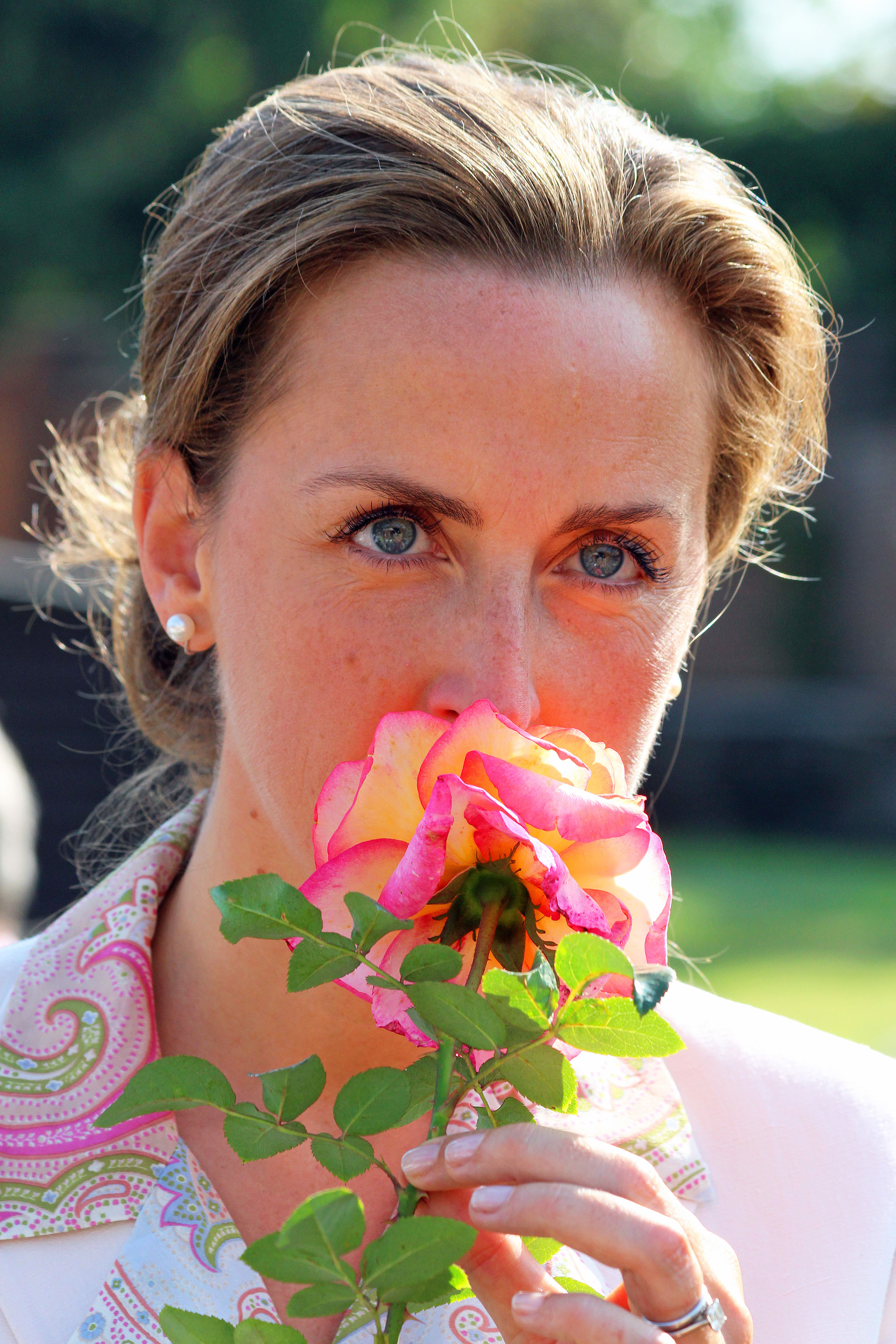
Princess Claire at a flower show in Le Rœulx, 2013

Unlike Queen Mathilde and Princess Astrid, Princess Claire has no defined official role.

She occasionally appears in public accompanying her husband, generally in support of environmental causes or animal charities. She is also a leading patron of the Brussels Choral Society, which sang at the religious part of her marriage ceremony. She is also active in organisations related to the United Kingdom in Belgium. She is a member of the Board of Trustees at the British School of Brussels and actively attends charitable and commemorative events hosted by the British Ambassador to Belgium.

== Titles and styles ==
Styles of Princess Claire of Belgium
- Reference style: Her Royal Highness
- Spoken style: Your Royal Highness

Coombs received the title Princess of Belgium from the King ten days before her marriage, by Royal Decree of 1 April 2003 (effective as of the date of the wedding, on 12 April 2003).

=== Honours ===
==== National ====
- Belgium: Grand Cordon of the Order of Leopold

==== Foreign ====
- Netherlands: Grand Cross of the Order of the Crown
- Norway: Grand Cross of the Order of Merit
- Portugal: Grand Cross of the Order of Infante Henrique
