= Chaumont-Gistoux =

Municipality in Walloon Brabant province, Wallonia, Belgium

- Municipality
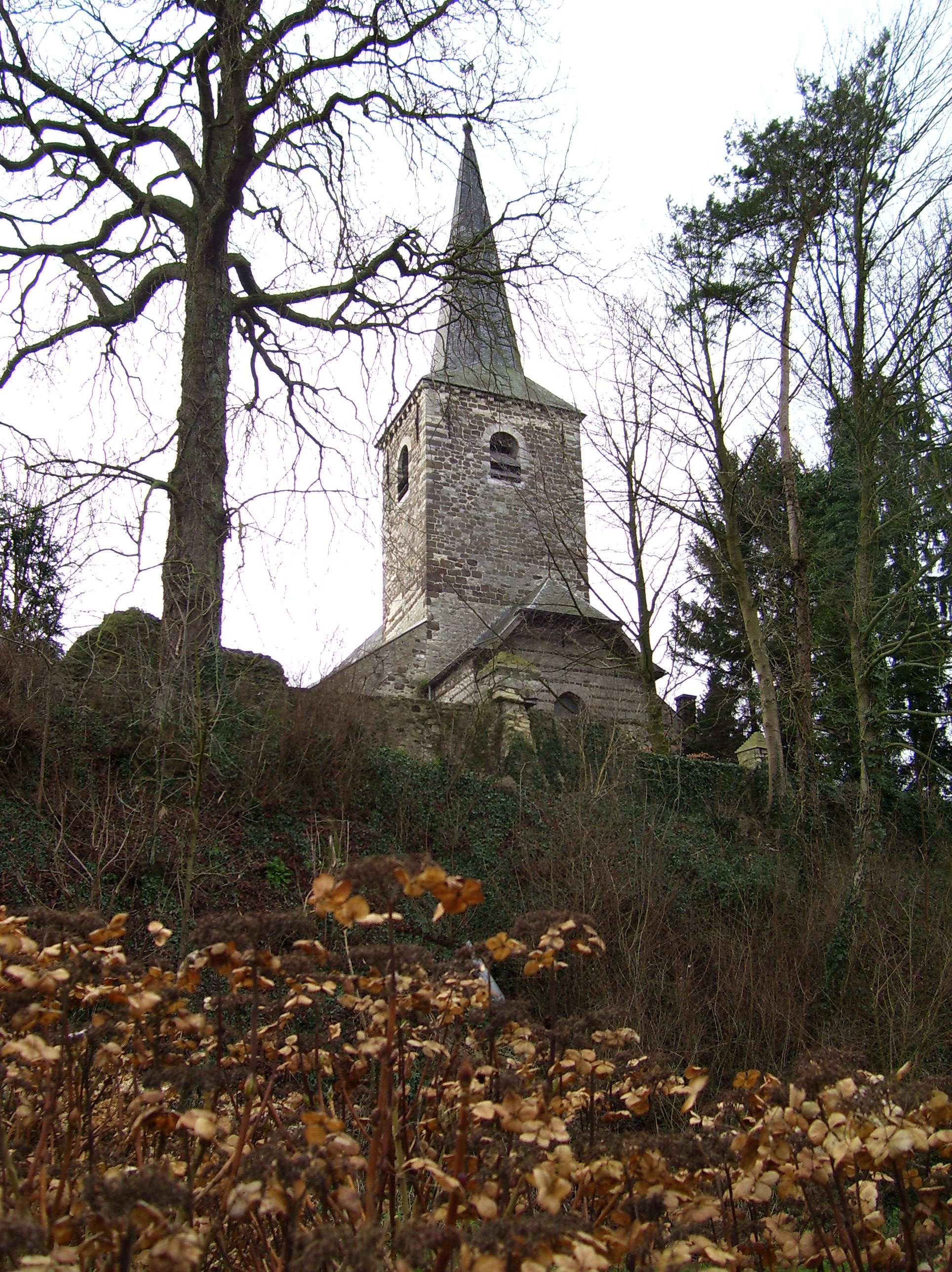

- Flag Coat of arms

- The municipality of Chaumont-Gistoux in Walloon Brabant
- Interactive map of Chaumont-Gistoux
- Location in Belgium
- Coordinates: 50.67686°N 4.71956°E
- Country: Belgium
- Community: French Community
- Region: Wallonia
- Province: Walloon Brabant
- Arrondissement: Nivelles

Government
  - Mayor: Luc Decorte (ARC)
  - Governing parties: ARC, Ecolo

Area
  - Total: 48.33 km^{2} (18.66 sq mi)

Population (2018-01-01)
  - Total: 11,731
  - Density: 242.7/km^{2} (628.7/sq mi)
- Postal codes: 1325
- NIS code: 25018
- Area codes: 010
- Website: www.chaumont-gistoux.be

Chaumont-Gistoux (French pronunciation: [ʃomɔ̃ ʒistu]; Walloon: Tchåmont-Djistou) is a municipality of Wallonia located in the Belgian province of Walloon Brabant. On 1 January 2006 Chaumont-Gistoux had a total population of 10,926. The total area is 48.09 km^{2} which gives a population density of 227 inhabitants per km^{2}.

It was formed from the fusion, in 1977, of Dion-Valmont (itself a fusion in 1971 of Dion-le-Val and Dion-le-Mont), Bonlez, Corroy-le-Grand, Longueville and Chaumont-Gistoux. The administrative offices are now in the village of Gistoux.

It is a semi-rural municipality with several working farms, large areas given over to fields and forests, although there is a major industry of sand extraction, now mostly in decline. Due to this history there are now several haulage and construction firms based in the municipality.

Chaumont-Gistoux is on the KW-line, a defensive line erected early in the Second World War, intended to prevent invasion from Nazi Germany. A small museum houses information about the line and many exhibits from the war.

Princess Claire of Belgium grew up in Chaumont-Gistoux. The Coombs family still resides there to this day, and the Princess, her husband Prince Laurent and their children are often seen in the municipality.

== Villages in the municipality ==
Bonlez, Chaumont, Corroy-le-Grand, Dion-le-Mont, Dion-le-Val, Gistoux, Longueville and Vieusart or (Vieux-Sart).
