= Healthcare in Belgium =

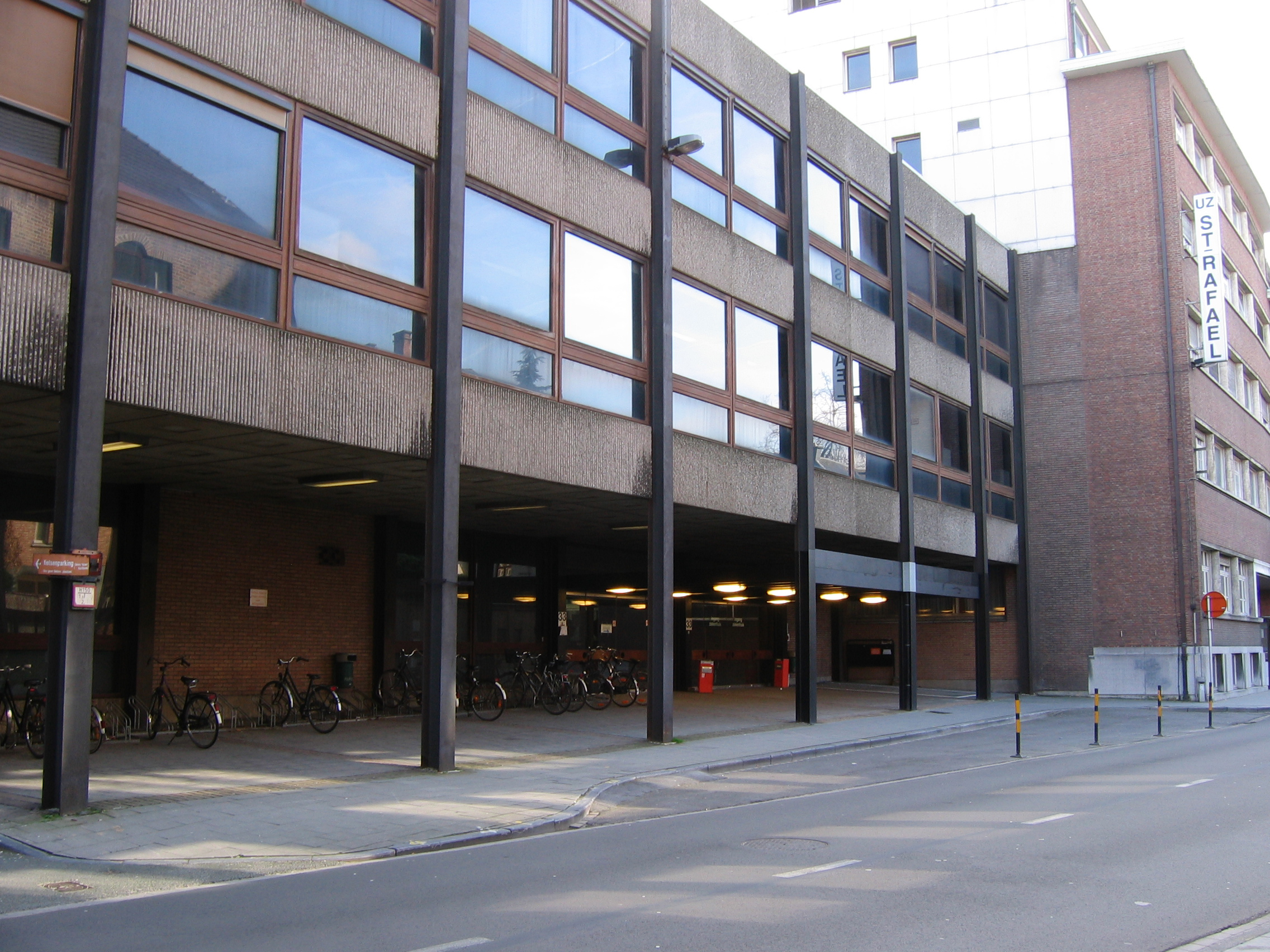
University Hospitals Leuven Sint-Rafael

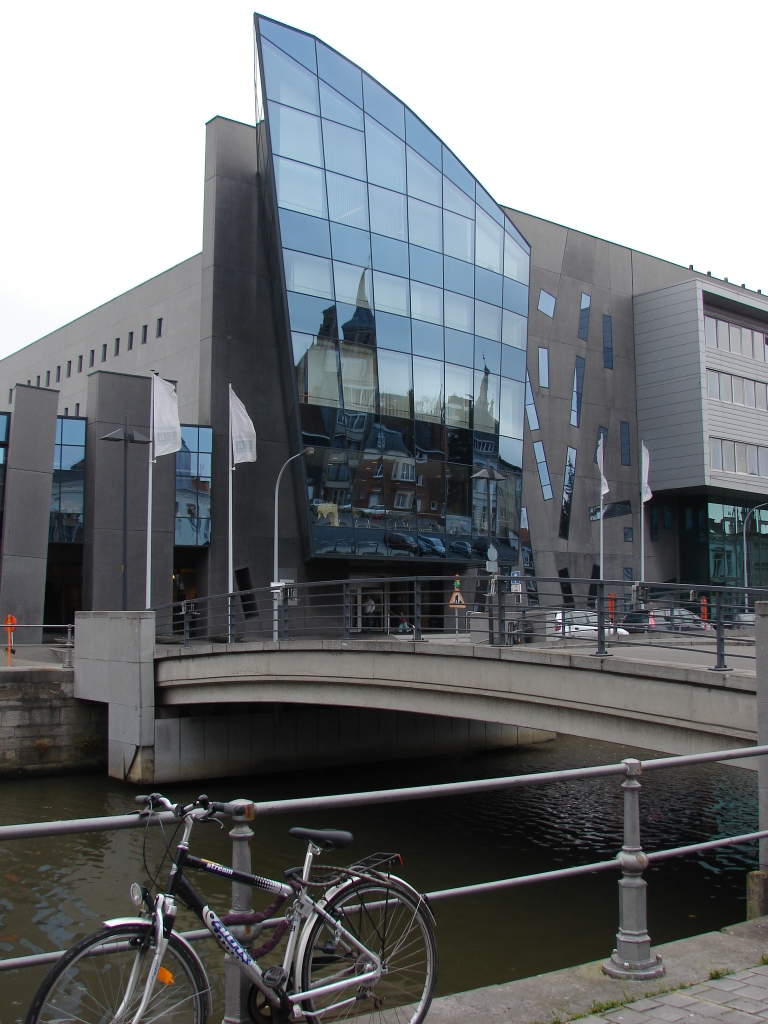
AZ Groeninge

Belgium has a universal healthcare system, which is composed of three parts: first, there is a primarily publicly funded health care and social security service run by the federal government, which organises and regulates healthcare; independent private/public practitioners, university/semi-private hospitals and care institutions. There are a few (commercially-run for-profit) private hospitals. Secondly is the insurance coverage provided for patients. Finally, industry coverage, which covers the production and distribution of healthcare products for research and development. The primary aspect of this research is done in universities and hospitals.

== Organization ==
Healthcare in Belgium is mainly the responsibility of the federal minister and the "FOD Volksgezondheid en Sociale Zekerheid / SPF Santé Publique et Securité Sociale" ("Public Administration for Public Health and Social Security"). The responsibility is exercised by the governments of the Flemish, Walloon regions and the German-speaking community. Both the Belgian federal government and the regional governments have ministers for public health and a supportive administrative civil service.

=== Political and regulatory ===
Territorial Competence	Administrative service
Federal: Legislative / Federal Parliament; Executive / Federal Minister of Public Health and Social Security Maggie De Block (2014-2019); Judiciary / Administrative court: Council of State (Raad van State / Conseil d'État) Appeals: Court of Labour (Arbeidshof / Cour du travail); First Instance: Labour Court (Arbeidsrechtbank / Tribunal du travail)	Public Administration for Public Health, Food Chain Safety and the environment (FOD Volksgezondheid, Veiligheid van de Voedselketen en Leefmilieu / SPF Santé publique, Sécurité de la Chaîne alimentaire et Environnement) Public Health: MEDEX: Department for Medical Expertise / Civil service staff, absences, accidents at work, work related diseases; Medical certification of pilots & air traffic controllers; Medical certification of professional drivers; Medical certification of ship officers; War victims & military victims in peacetime; Victims of violent crime; Ombuds service; Medical evaluation centres; Superior Health Council: Scientific advisory board / Psychiatric health care: behaviour issues, addiction, education in psychiatric healthcare, best practice in therapy; Environmental issues: Ionising radiation, sound & dust pollution; Chemical environmental issues: chemical agents, pollution agents, biocides and pesticides; Health and safety in nutrition and in the food chain; Biohazards: (human) blood products, tissues and organs, infectious diseases, epidemiological monitoring; Cosmetology; Public Health Genomics; Consultative bodies: / Commissions and consultations between public administration and healthcare institutions and organisations: National Council for Hospitals and Care institutions Nationale Raad voor Ziekenhuisvoorzieningen (N.R.Z.V.) / Coordination advisory council between government and hospitals & care institutions; Multipart structure / Consultation advisory council constituted of: professional organisations of: physicians, general practitioners, and specialists, nurses; other medical practitioners; hospitals and care institutions; medical insurers; the government; experts from: public health, food chain safety and environment; National Institute for Health and Disability Insurance; Belgian Health Care Knowledge Centre; National Council for Hospitals and Care institutions Nationale Raad voor Ziekenhuisvoorzieningen (N.R.Z.V.); Commission for Control of the Healthcare Budget and RIZIV; Inspectorate of Finance (from Treasury Department, public spending).; Joint Commission (De Nationale Paritaire Commissie Geneesheren-Ziekenhuizen) / Consultation and advisory commission physicians - hospitals; Commissions / Working groups (Special Interest Commissions) on: Telematica (application of digital technology); Hospital digitisation; Health networks; Communication 1st & 2nd-line care; Digital data communication of care practitioners; Personal health data management; Remote healthcare; Embryo in vitro; Antibiotics; Patient rights; Euthanasia; Abortion; Federal Platforms / Advisory boards for: Palliative care; Psychiatric care; Coma patients; Hospital hygiene; Blood transfusion (BeQuinT); Board of physicians / Medical practice, quality and evaluation advisory: Cardiac Pathologies; Geriatrics; Specialised Emergency response and care; Intensive care; Chronic kidney disease; Mother and newborn infants; Medical imaging and Radiation therapy; Reproductive Health; Oncology; Paediatrics; Inter-ministerial and intergovernmental conferences / Consultative and coordination between Ministerial Depts. of Federal and Regional governments: Agriculture; Food safety; Scientific R&D Policy; Public health; General policy; Epidemic control; Drug spolicy; Committees / Consultative committees: Belgian counselling Committee for Bio-ethics; Medical - pharmaceutical committee; Federal breastfeeding committee; Committee for medical utensils and machinery; Planning Commission / Investigates and plans Demand for care practitioners.: Working group on physicians (GP) and specialists; Working group on physiotherapists; Working group on dentists; Working group on nurses; Scientific working group; Scientific Institute of Public health: / Scientific expertise in public healthcare: Directorate Communicable and infectious diseases / Plays an important role within the Belgian, European and international networks of surveillance and response to infectious diseases and food safety hazards.: detection; early and rapid identification; microbiological monitoring of communicable and infectious agents, preventing and treating such diseases.; food borne pathogens; bacterial diseases; viral diseases; mycology and aerobiology; immunology; Directorate Expertise, service provision and customer relations / Providing the logistical, technical and scientific support.: Biological standardisation: Assessment and checking the quality of biological medicines for human use (vaccines and blood products) before market; Quality of medical laboratories: Assessment and checking the quality of clinical biology laboratories and in vitro diagnostic and medical devices; Biosafety and biotechnology & platform Molecular biology and biotechnology: Assessing the risks linked to the use of genetically modified organisms (GMOs); Directorate Food, medicines and consumer safety / Analytical chemical research to promote public health: detect the presence of chemical substances in food, consumer non-durables and the environment; scientific research in the following domains: Medicines; Consumer safety; Chemical residues and contaminants; Directorate Public Health and surveillance epidemiology and toxicology centre / To provide reliable, practical and impartial information on the health of the Belgian population, inform the policy makers and population on factors that influence public health and public health policy.: risk factors that affect health and well-being; monitoring health problems illnesses that constitute a risk to public health; assess the impact of lifestyle on public health; improve quality of care; assess risks of exposure to chemical substances and radiation; coordinate sharing and transmission of health information in Belgium; Belgian GLP Monitoring Programme / Quality Assurance Bureau (QAB) of IPH has been the official GLP (Good Laboratory Practice) Monitoring Authority for Belgium since 1988; Federal Agency for medicines and health products. / The competent authority for medicines and health products in Belgium.; Safety of the food chain: Federal Agency for the Safety of the Food Chain (FASFC). / The competent authority for safety of the food chain in Belgium; Environment: Federal agency for nuclear control (FANC) / Monitors and controls the general public, workers, and the environment against the dangers of radiation.; Plants and animals: CODA-CERVA (Veterinary and Agrochemical Research Centre / Proactive policy in terms of food production safety, animal health and public health, at both the Federal and international levels: scientific research; expert advice; provision of services; veterinary activities: epidemic, endemic and emerging transmittable diseases in animals; zoonotic and emerging infectious diseases threatening public health; epidemiology: surveillance, risk analysis, and molecular epidemiology; agrochemical activities; contaminants and the quality of the environment in the framework of safe food production
Flemish Community: Legislative / the Flemish parliament; Executive / the Flemish Government, competent minister for welfare and social affairs, as of 2015 Jo Van Deurzen; Judiciary / none competent at this level	The competent administration is the Flemish Public service for family-matters, wellbeing and health.: health strategic competences; public smoking ban, regulation and control, assistance with smoking cessation; regulations on sale of alcohol; drug and alcohol abuse and addiction; health risks in construction; radiation of wireless antennae; subsidizing; school milk and fruit; controls on food quality and industrial kitchens; sexual health; hearing damage prevention; help and assistance with: psychological help; violence and abuse; addiction; healthcare; prevention; vaccination programs; prevention in hospital and care environments; patient rights; insurance; care situations; home care; psychiatric care; geriatric care; palliative care; disabled; basic support budget (Basisondersteuningsbudget - BOB) and personal assistance budget (Persoonsvolgende budget - PVB) financial support programs for disabled people; elderly support benefit; assistance for people with limited mobility; recognition as disabled person and caregiver; assistance with living for disabled; learning and working for disabled people; mobility issuers for disabled people
French Speaking Community: Legislative / The Parliament of the French-speaking Community; Executive / The Walloon government Competent minister, as of 2015 Joelle Milquet; Judiciary / none competent at this level	The competent administration is the "Direction de la Santé Publique de la federation Wallonie- Bruxelles".: health strategic competences: public anti-addiction programs, smoking ban, drug and alcohol abuse, addiction support; school health and kitchens; healthcare prevention, vaccination programs; care situations: home care, psychiatric care, geriatric care, care for disabled people
German-speaking Community: Legislative / The Parliament of the German-speaking community; Executive / The government of the German-speaking community Competent minister for welfare and social affairs, as of 2015 Herr Antonios Antoniadis, Minister für Familie, Gesundheit und Soziales; Judiciary / none competent at this level	The competent administration is the "Ministerium der DG".: health for Children: school health and kitchens, health care, prevention, vaccination programs; health for the elderly: home care, geriatric care, psychiatric care, industrial kitchens; care for disabled people
Provincial authorities: Legislative / The Provincial Council, which is the elected body; Executive / The Deputation or Provincial College and the Governor, who is appointed by the regional government, are the executive body. Within that college one deputy has the responsibility for welfare and social affairs.; Judiciary / none competent at this level	The Provincial authority for welfare is competent for matters that transcend the local level or local competences.: assistance of people with disabilities and special needs; assistance with chronic care; assistance with psychological care; assistance for palliative care; geriatric care; care of children taken into public care by the juvenile judge; hygienic control of industrial kitchens; monitoring and registering of genetic birth defects; The provincial authority is also competent for catastrophe planning and management of the emergency services.: ambulance services; fire-fighting services, including the civil protection service; private subcontractors (towing services, salvage, lifting and transport services) in case of emergencies or catastrophes; coordination of all emergency services (police, highway services, army) during catastrophes
Local authorities: Legislative / City or Communal Council; Executive / College of Mayor and Aldermen; dedicated alderman for Social affairs; Judiciary / none competent at this level	The Public Centre for Social Welfare is a local authority public service.: in Dutch - Openbaar centrum voor maatschappelijk welzijn (OCMW), in French - Centre public d'action sociale (CPAS); in German - Öffentliches Sozialhilfezentrum (ÖSHZ).; In larger cities these public services manage large budgets, with a substantial administrative burden. They operate hospitals, clinics, rehabilitation centers, retirement/pensioners residences and day care centres. The largest PCSW is the one in Antwerp. In 2013, it managed a budget of 461 million euros, and paid benefits to people with no or very low incomes, for a total of 125 million. The PCSW employs a workforce of over 1000 people. Hospitals and other care institutions are grouped into a separate organisation called ZNA. (Care Network Antwerp) employs another 7000 people, and in 2010, had a budget of approximately 568 million euros. A recent decision (made public in January 2015) by the Flemish regional government, aims at abolishing this local authority service, which had a substantial measure of independence and authority from the political elected councillors. It will bring it under the authority of the communal council within the next 2 years. This decision is being contested by the opposition, and by legal impediments at the federal governmental level.

== Care ==
Generally speaking, health care is organised in three layers:

- First line: the primary care function that is provided by physicians (GPs), emergency services and emergency rooms in hospitals. Polyclinics provide nonurgent first-line care (such as diagnosis and following up patients).
- Second line: acute and immediate care provided by hospitals for patients requiring technical interventions (surgery, technical diagnostics etc.) and acute curative care.
- Chronic or long-term care: is provided by rehab-clinics, service-flat care providers, old-age homes and home-care services.

=== Physicians ===
For common conditions like the cold, the flu, injuries and pain, patients contact their GPs.

Physicians in private practice are generally self-employed. Officially, they are categorized in the following framework:

- Private practice:
  - General practitioners (family doctors) usually operate from their private practice although some group practices are emerging. The doctors are also syndicated in local chapters, which organise out-of-hours services during weekend and holidays and for the evening hours and during vacations. Patients can call a duty GP 24/7 who has access to their medical records.
  - Specialists: many combine their private practice with a hospital posting, a teaching position or a similar research posting. Only a few operate private clinics (mostly ophthalmologists or dentists).
  - Experts and assessment consultants: such specialists do not see general patients but evaluate patients either as a second opinion at the request of the patient or are appointed to assess patients and treatments for insurance purposes or by appointment by a court.
- Clinical practice:
  - Specialists: many clinical specialists have a teaching position in hospitals (teaching staff, assistants or trainees and nurses on the job) or combine their hospital position with a teaching position at a university.
  - Research clinicians: run clinical trials and do research.

Most doctors working in hospitals also have a private practice. Exceptions include neurosurgeons or radiologists because they cannot invest in the high-tech equipment that is required. Doctors are usually paid on a fee for service by the patient at their private practice or by the hospital. Some specialists are employees on a hospital payroll or for research labs or universities. Assessment consultants are paid a fixed fee for their assessment report by whoever hired them.

=== Emergency services ===
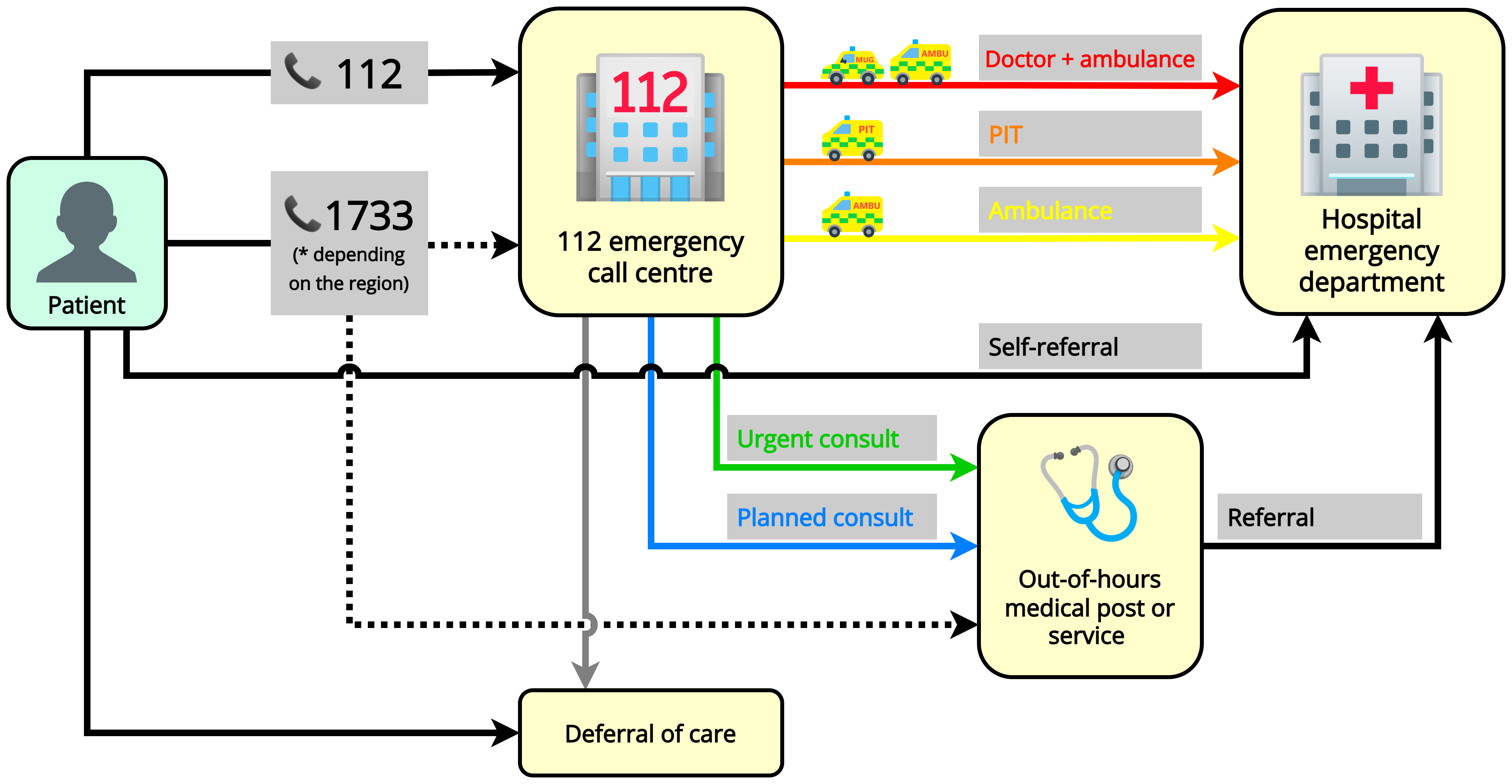
Schematic of the Belgian system for unplanned care (EMS as well as urgent primary care) as of 2022.

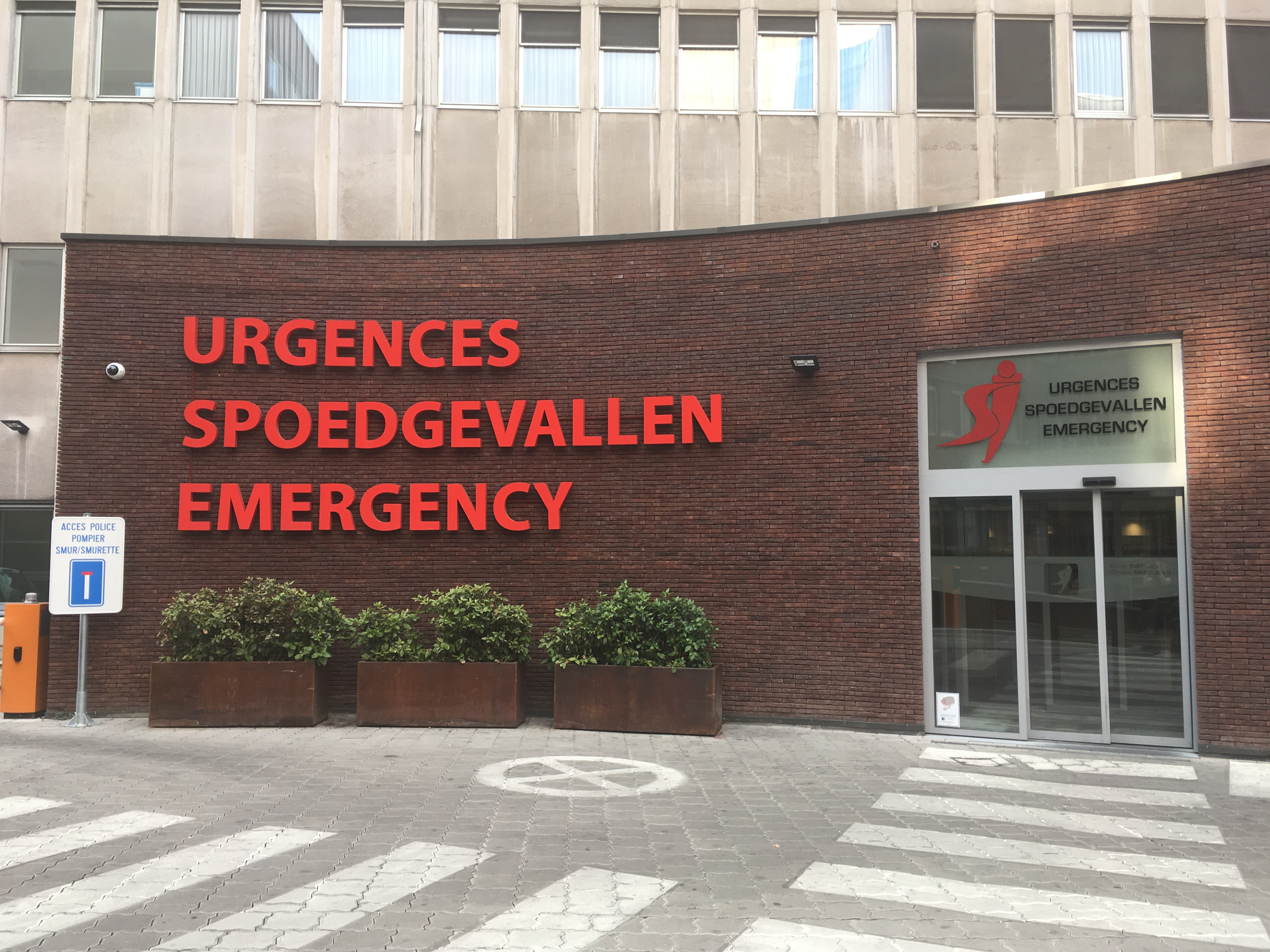
Entrance of a hospital emergency department in Brussels

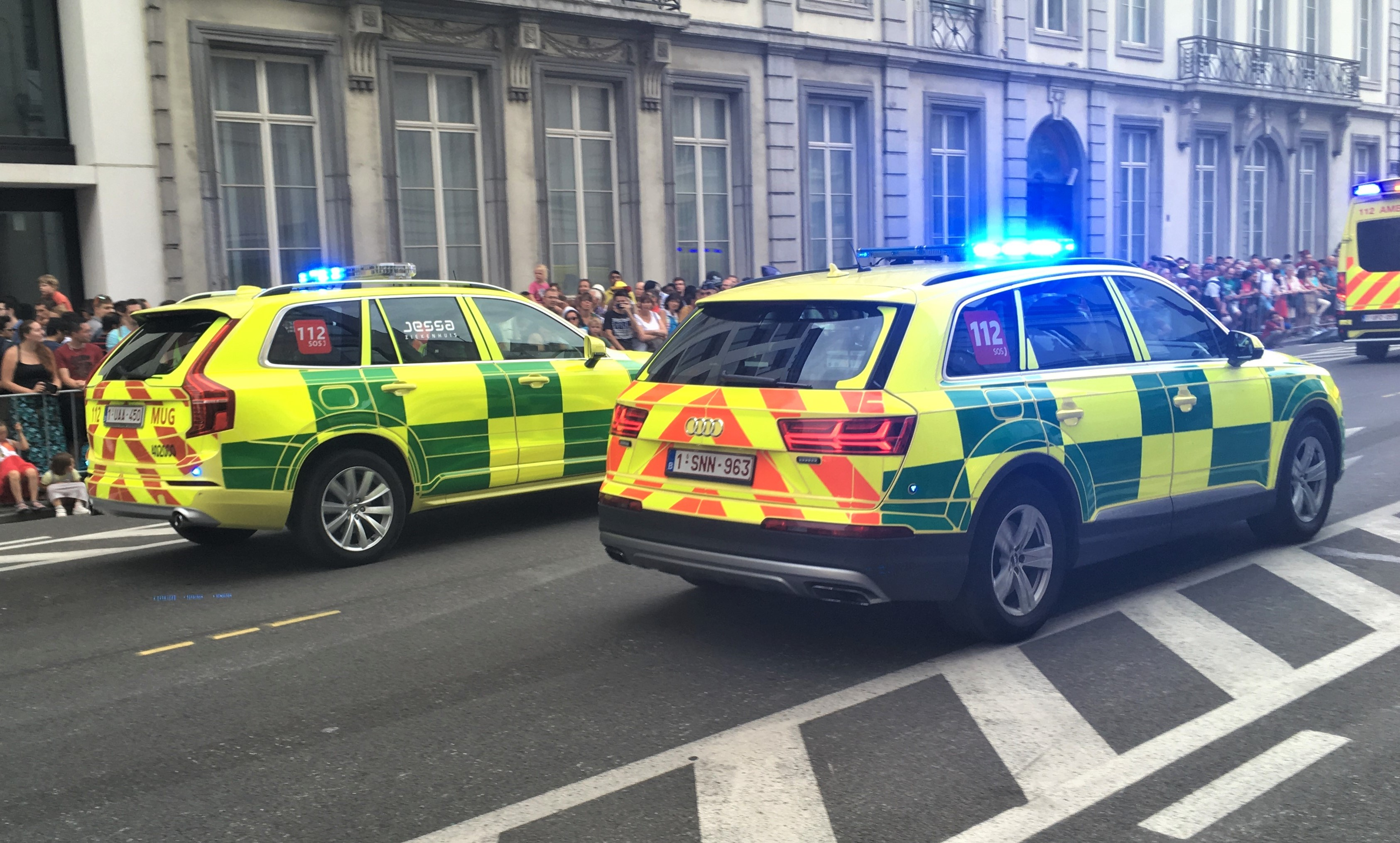
Two Medical Emergency Response vehicles with Battenburg markings

For accidents and medical emergencies, everybody can call on the emergency services. There are two phone numbers to contact the Emergency Services Network: 100 or 112. 100 gives access to the Ambulance service or Fire department. In larger cities, the fire department operates the ambulances, which elsewhere may be allocated to hospitals or ran by private organisations. 112 gives access to the police, ambulance services and fire department. The centre for the 100 and 112 services dispatches an available ambulance from the closest hospital or ambulance centre. The operator is qualified to decide to dispatch a regular ambulance, a Medical Emergency Response vehicles (MUG/SMUR) or a paramedical Intervention Team (PIT). Additionally, the Belgian Red Cross operates a number of ambulances, as do privately owned companies that operate ambulances for the emergency network. The Red Cross and a number of other "cross" charities own ambulances and have volunteers that man first-aid posts during events like football matches, cycling races, sports or other mass events. They do not participate in the daily emergency services network, but they free the it from allocating too many assets and resources during those mass events. In the case of (potential) mass casualty events, the Red Cross assists the regular emergency services to avoid occupying all other medical resources in the area by deploying First Intervention Teams (FITs), ambulances, intervention vehicles and more.

An ambulance is staffed by two paramedics. The ambulance usually brings the patient to the nearest hospital. Depending on the medical condition, a Medical Emergency Response vehicle (MUG/SMUR) may be dispatched. It is staffed by at least two people, an ER doctor and a senior ER nurse, and is stationed at a hospital. Sometimes there is an additional nurse or paramedic (in training) on board. The ER doctor chooses the nearest appropriate hospital that has the necessary facilities based on the patient's symptoms and condition or a hospital in which the patient is under active treatment. Besides regular Medical Emergency Response vehicles, there are also two Medical Emergency Response helicopters in Belgium, based in Bruges (Flanders) and Bra-sur-Lienne (Wallonia). The helicopters are privately funded for the most part. There are also a few dozen of Paramedical Intervention Teams, which are usually staffed by one paramedic and one ER nurse and have some additional equipment that the ER nurse can use.

As of January 1, 2019, the fee is 60€.

=== Hospitals ===
The Federal Service for Public Health describes the hospital sector in the following manner:

==== General structure ====
There are two distinct types of hospitals: general hospitals and psychiatric hospitals. Psychiatric patients are kept away from the general hospital population.

There are 209 hospitals:

- 68 psychiatric hospitals care for psychiatric patients that require care in a controlled restricted environment. Some of the hospitals also offer therapy day clinics for patients who stay at home.
- 141 general hospitals are mostly involved in providing non-surgical care for adults with services such as cardiology, pneumology, gastro-enterology and endocrinology. They also provide a maternity ward, and most of them have an emergency response unit.
  - 113 are general acute hospitals.
    - 7 are university hospitals directly linked to universities and provide for teaching and research facilities.
    - 16 general hospitals with university status that have special provisions to collaborate with universities and colleges for teaching and research purposes.
  - 20 smaller specialized hospitals, which provide care for heart and vascular diseases, pulmonary diseases, locomotor disorders, neurological problems, palliative care, chronic diseases or psychogeriatric care.
  - 8 geriatric hospitals with care specifically for the elderly.

The vast majority of hospitals are publicly funded. They are independent units or part of larger organizations that get funding from the public health service based on factors like the activities that they perform, the number of beds operated, and their specialist knowledge. In Belgium, there are only a handful of privately-owned/operated hospitals that work outside and without the public health service funding. They provide luxury services and luxury accommodation for patients who can afford such exclusive services.

Healthcare Belgium is a non-profit organisation established in 2007 by six prominent Belgian hospital groups with support from the medical technology industry in Belgium.

Outside those categories are:

- day-clinics for ambulant patients to have therapy and then return home. Many hospitals have sections for day clinics.
- polyclinics for different specialists to see patients who do not need to stay overnight in the hospital for diagnosis or post therapy controle. Many general hospitals operate polyclinics, but there are institutions outside hospitals that operate only as polyclinics.

In general hospitals, any of the following departments may be at the disposal of patients, but not all general hospitals offer all of the facilities and departments:

- Emergencies and trauma center usually backed up by an intensive care unit.
- Operating theatres.
- Polyclinic consultations, ambulance or out-patient care: patients can come during office hours to see a specialist either in the diagnostic phase, therapeutic phase or post-therapy follow-up consultations.
- Technical diagnostics such as collection of blood or bodily fluid-samples, and lab testing; medical imaging; X-rays, CT scan, MRI or ultrasound); EEG, ECG and extended monitoring outside acute illness situations;
- Nursing units: standard hospital ward type of sections where patients get 24/7 care, post-operation recovery
- Specialised units may be sections in a general hospital, independent units within a general hospital or independent specialised clinics:
  - Neo-natal and pediatric clinics
  - Rehabilitation and recovery clinics
  - Geriatric clinics
  - Palliative care units
  - Psychological assistance units
- Research units: units within a general hospital that are specialised in running, caring for and following patients/participants in clinical trials.

=== Nursing ===
Different levels of nursing training are available: basic nurse, midwife, full nurse

- Nursing in hospitals: in hospitals, the nursing work ranges from basic care nurse, who performs no medical acts; nursing assistants, full-nurse; chief ward nurse; trauma nurse or paramedics; ER- or OR- nurses and chief-nurse. Each position requires a different level of formal training, on-the-job training, accumulated experience and responsibilities. Nurses seldom work over their competence because according to the Peter principle, that would cause casualties. Nurses in care units work two shifts every day. Many nursing wards in general hospitals are currently chronically understaffed, exceptions being ER, OR and ICU. Some postsurgical wards such as cardio, thoracic and neuro surgery units that operate MCMUs (mid-care monitoring units) often are less prone to understaffing because of the risks involved for patients.
- Nursing in research and polyclinic environment: nurses in research and polyclinic environments often have a more family friendly and limited five-days-a-week eight-hours-a-day work patterns than their counterparts in the hospital care nursing units. Not all nurses like to work in such environments, however.
- Ambulant nursing (home care): when patients go home, they often require following up their hospital care like with wound dressing, injections and bathing. Specialised ambulant nursing services provide such nurse-at-home services for recovering patients and elderly people living at home. Such services also dispatch basic care nurses, who do not perform medical acts for patients and elderly but help with their daily hygiene and changing of clothes.

=== Pharmacy ===
- Community pharmacies: drugs and medications may be sold only by pharmacies. Supermarkets and diet shops may sell products such as over-the-counter food-supplements, but any product claiming medical effects, even over-the-counter painkillers or stomach tablets, is limited to pharmacies. An establishment permit and an exploitation permit are required for pharmacies.
- Hospital Pharmacies dispense drugs and medications for administration by nurses and doctors only in a hospital environment. Many of these products are not available over the counter.
- Distribution of care products: companies that wish to produce, import or distribute substances that can be qualified as medicinal must have a license, and they are strictly monitored. Their stock movements are controlled by a very close monitoring system.

Internet medication: a patient who buys medication in another EU country from a pharmacy for personal use by prescription or over the counter can import them into Belgium in the luggage or vehicle. Belgian patients may legally buy over-the-counter painkillers such as paracetamol in the Netherlands, where they are cheaper, and take them to Belgium. However, attempting to import prescription drugs without a prescription, unregistered or forbidden medication, or narcotics purchased on the internet or recreational drugs illegally on the street is prohibited, and customs and police track that business rather strictly. Illegally imported drugs are confiscated, and the carrier may be fined or imprisoned.

Under the Healthcare Act of 30 October 2018, electronic prescriptions will become mandatory.

== Health insurance ==
=== History ===
- May 26, 1813 (under the French regime): after a minepit disaster in Ourthe, an Imperial decree created a miners-fund. It is financed by the employers and workers and which pays miners an allowance in case of permanent disability or medical incapacitation.
- September 19, 1844 : A welfare fund "De Hulp- en Voorzorgskas voor Zeevarenden onder Belgische Vlag" ("Assistance- and providential fund for Belgian merchant navy sailors") allowing workers an insurance-like cover against illness, disability, old age pensions, work-related accidents and unemployment.
- April 16, 1849 : The Government subsidizes the cost of incorporation of the societies of mutual assistance .
- May 8, 1850: The Government creates the "Algemene Lijfrentekas (later state-owned ASLK-bank), where every Belgian can save money for his old-age pension.
- 1869 : Incorporation of the first Socialist Mutuality, "La Solidarité", at Fayt-lez-Manage, the forerunner of SOCMUT (Socialistische mutualiteit), one of the three most important entities in the modern Belgian social security system
- 1894 : The first national law concerning the finance and provision of health care in Belgium was enacted, with social insurance being introduced in 1945.

=== Coverage and gaps in Belgium's social security system ===
Health insurance is only one of the pillars of the system of social security provided for every Belgian citizen. Every Belgian citizen has access to the social security system—it is compulsory—but there are gaps in the system where people can drop out. For example, not paying contributions is one such exit, and another is homelessness (social security is only available to people with an address).

==== Financing the system: compulsory social security ====
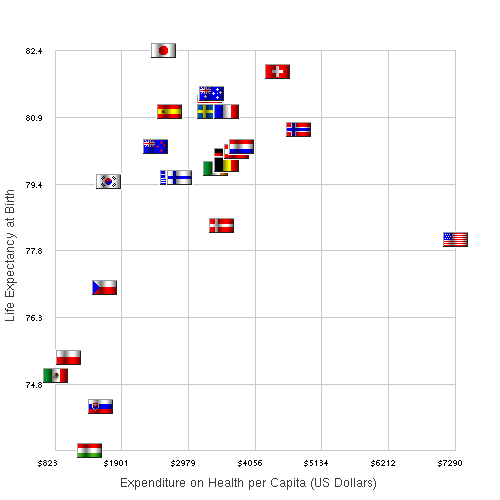
Life expectancy vs healthcare spending for some countries in 2007

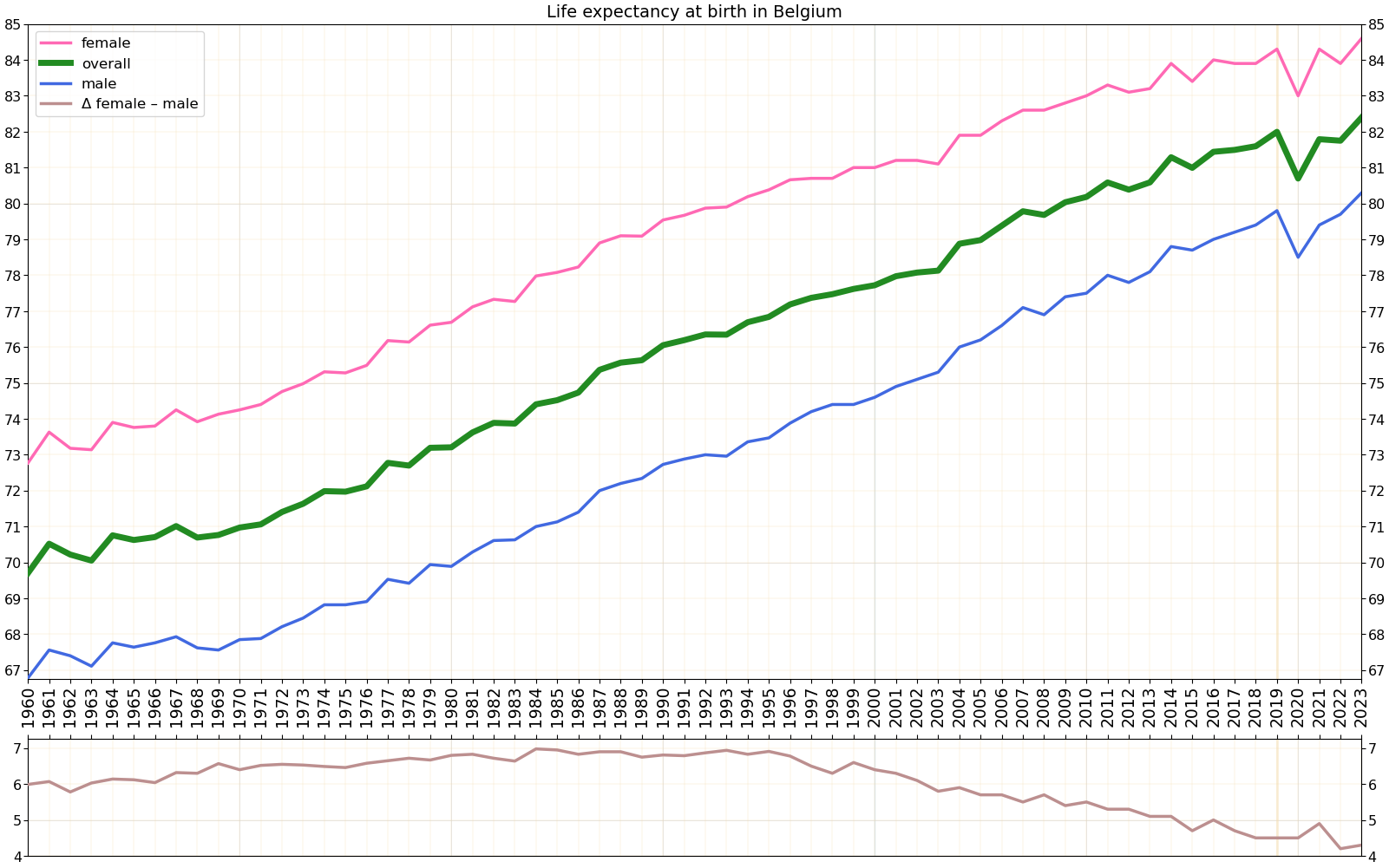
Life expectancy development in Belgium by gender

Every wage-earning worker or employee in a factory, office, working as house personnel (maids, chauffeurs etc.), and anyone working in Belgium is registered to a central system as well as the unemployed. The self-employed, such as shopkeepers, innkeepers, lawyers, and doctors are also registered.

Workers are paid a daily or monthly wage their gross salary. From that gross salary, their employer has to deduct a certain amount (approx 13%) for social security and another (approx 20%) for taxes. The employer has to pay these amounts directly to the Social Security Services and the Inland Revenue Service (employers make these payments for the employee and deduct these payments from his wage). On top of the gross salary, the employer has to pay an employer's contribution for social security of approx 15–22% to the Social Security Services. Failing to make these payments regularly and on-time is closely monitored and often causes failing businesses to be taken to court for failing to comply with their social security and fiscal obligations towards their workers. This reduces the risk for workers when they remain unpaid or when their contributions are not paid for them.
The Self-employed have a system in which they have to declare their earnings and based on their earnings a contribution is calculated which is roughly 20%-22%, but they are not covered like workers. People can opt into the system through this self-employed scheme. The government forms its tax earnings finances in part the social security system. This is a wealth re-distribution mechanism, because the contributions are incremental, this means that the more someone earns the more this person will contribute. Moreover, for health services, the compulsory health insurance and the refund system is the same for everybody (corrected for the lowest incomes) : i.e. for a consultation at the GP everybody pays the same and gets the same refund (irrespective of their income).

==== Financing the system: complementary systems ====
There is a complementary system of health insurance offered by the mutualities (extended hospital cover and travel cover), available to all mutuality members, and there is private insurance with commercial insurance companies for extended care (hospital and aftercare) and for travel care.
These systems are pure premium based insurance system.

==== Covering healthcare costs ====
1. Consultations with GPs or specialists in their private practise

- patients pay a fee for the consultation (approx 20-€25 for a GP) and for any medical acts (e.g. dental care at the dentist) (s)he may perform directly to the doctor, in return the patient gets a receipt that lists all the medical acts performed, and if necessary a prescription for medication.
- the patient gives this receipt to their mutuality, and they refund the patient in part (depending on the patients status), average patients get about 75% refunded
- some patients have a special social security code; they pay only €1 to the doctor, and do not receive a refund receipt. The doctor is paid directly by the mutuality (3rd payer system)
- the patient takes their prescription to a pharmacist, paying only part of its price; for each medication dispensed the supplier is paid a supplement by the social security services. In some cases the medication requires extra checks and such medication is often free to the patient, although very expensive. Each sale of the medication is tracked, and the supplier paid by the social security services directly.

2. Consultations at hospitals (polyclinic)

- patients see a doctor at the hospital polyclinic just link in their private practise.
- some patients pay the hospital as they leave and get a receipt for their mutuality, just like in a private practise; however many patient come in for follow-up consultations after a medical intervention or hospitalisation. The hospitals send the bill to the mutuality (3rd payer system) and patients get invoiced for their personal part.

3. Hospitalisations and medical interventions

- patients are hospitalised and they have to pay weekly advances for their medical expenses (usually 50-€100 per week).
- all consultations and interventions, medications etc. are directly invoiced to the mutuality and to and insurance cover the patient may have (3rd payer system)
- they receive an invoice for their personal part, which is often in part refundable by their complementary insurance.
- patients who suffer accidents might never have to pay any medical expenses, as accident insurers are often charged immediately, once responsibility is established.

==== Managing healthcare money streams ====
- Private insurance: private insurance companies collect premiums and provide cover, when an "insured risk" is realised the insurance company pays.
  - Legal systems protect patients, doctors and hospitals from abusive denials of refunds by insurers a governmental complaints authority keeps an eye on policy conditions and execution.
  - Access to private insurance is of course free, however an independent ombudsman service (not an individual) oversees refusals to ensure or termination (by the insurers) due to changes in medical condition of the patient. A governmental arbitration service reviews patient cases referred to it by the ombudsman and determines fair conditions/premiums for refuses / terminated patients
- Mutuality complementary insurance: the mutuality collects premiums and pays according to the selected cover.
- Mutualities compulsory health insurance:
- The mutualities' front-office workers evaluate any refund claims superficially: is the medical act refundable and what rate, and refunds the patient nearly immediately (used to be in cash, now directly to the patients bank account)
- The receipt is the controlled through the mutuality back-office system such that one doesn't get double refunds and other abuses
- Some claims (based on the patient's status) incur supplemental refunds, which are sent by the mutuality back office to the patient's bank account
- The mutuality gets paid by the social security services
  - the amounts they pay as refund
  - a fee for operating cost: mutualities have an extensive network of offices and the number of staff runs in the thousands; they also have large computer networks and difficult software programs that are often tailor-made (because apart from the 6 or 7 mutualities no one else needs that software, and the amount of data treated is so extensive it requires much effort)

==== Patient identification ====
In the 1980s, a SIS Card (which is a plastic credit card-size chipcard like bank card) was introduced, the social security card. With it the federal government of Belgium introduced a "national number", that identified each individual uniquely based on their birthday. Every individual had such an SIS Card, and it established their entitlement to social security. In 2014, that system was superseded by the plastic ID card (Belgium eID card) with social security information on a card chip, readable with a simple card reader.

== Social security ==
Social security encompasses health, old-age (and other) pensions, unemployment, disability and handicap, both managing the finances (collection of contributions, subsidies and payment of refund, allowances etc.), but also the management of different kinds of care, regulation of the market of medicines, health and safety at work, health and safety of any public service rendered to the general public, monitoring safety of the food chain, etc.

== See also ==
- Belgian Health Care Knowledge Centre
- Flemish insurance for non-medical care
- Health in Belgium
- List of hospitals in Belgium
- Mantelzorg
- National Institute for Health and Disability Insurance
- Public Centre for Social Welfare
