= Judiciary of Belgium =

Court system overview

The judiciary of Belgium is similar to the French judiciary. Belgium evolved from a unitary to a federal state, but its judicial system has not been adapted to a federal system.

The Belgian judiciary is referred to as the courts and tribunals (Dutch: hoven en rechtbanken, French: cours et tribunaux, German: Gerichtshöfe und Gerichte) in official texts, such as the Belgian Constitution.

== Normal judicial system ==
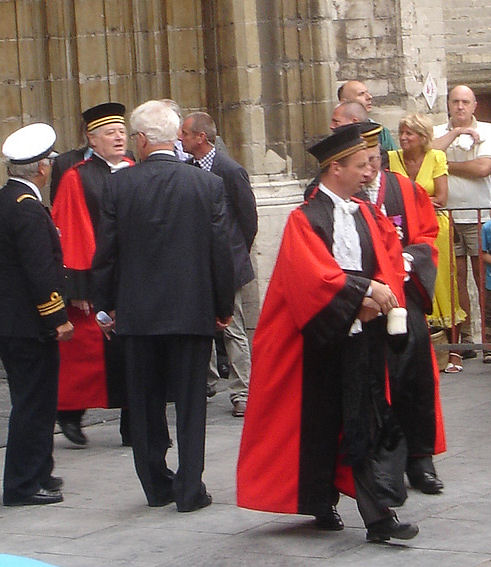
Belgian judges leaving St Bavo's Cathedral in Ghent after the solemn Te Deum on the National Holiday

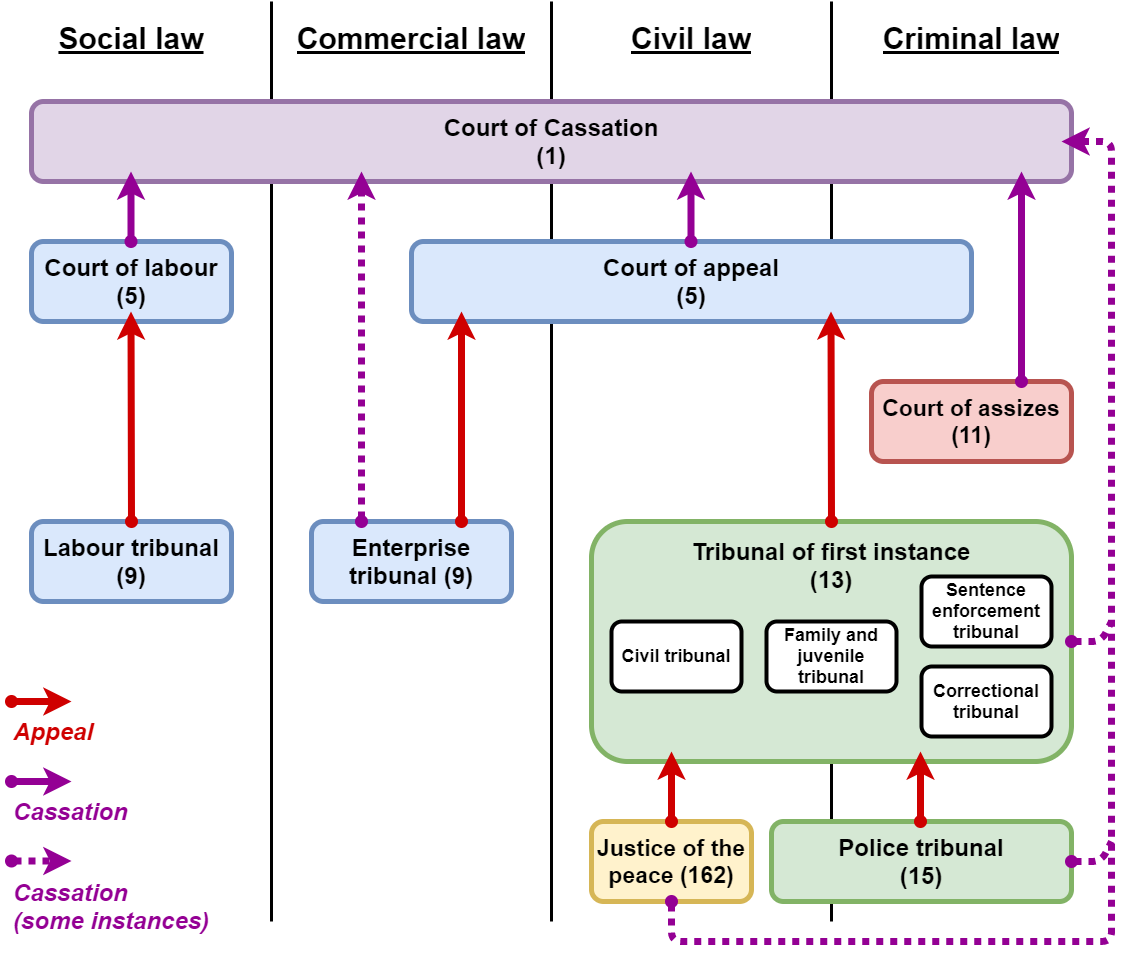
Belgian judicial hierarchy as of 2020: One for the entire country Organised per judicial area Organised per province (+ Brussels) Organised per judicial arrondissement Organised per judicial canton

=== Judicial subdivisions of the territory ===
As of 2018, the territory of Belgium is subdivided into 5 judicial areas (Antwerp, Brussels, Ghent, Liège and Mons), 12 judicial arrondissements and 187 judicial cantons for the purpose of organising the judicial system. Before April 2014, when the judicial subdivisions were reformed into the current ones, there were 27 judicial arrondissements and 225 judicial cantons. Except for Brussels and the provinces of Flemish Brabant and Liège, the current judicial arrondissements correspond with the provinces of Belgium.

Map of the 5 judicial areas (French names)

Map of the 12 judicial arrondissements as of 2014 (French names)

Map of the 27 judicial arrondissements from before 2014

=== Court of Cassation ===
The Court of Cassation (Dutch: Hof van Cassatie, French: Cour de Cassation, German: Kassationshof) is the supreme court of the Belgian judicial system. It only hears appeals in last resort against judgments and other decisions of lower courts (mostly the appellate courts), and only points of law. This means the Court of Cassation will not review or reconsider the findings of fact established by lower courts. The jurisdiction of the Court is limited to either upholding a decision that is contested, or either annulling (quashing) the contested decision if the decision violated or misinterpreted the law. The latter is referred to as "cassation". In case of cassation, the Court of Cassation will generally refer the case to a different court of the same rank as the one whose decision was annulled. The case will then be retried on both questions of fact and questions of law by that court. By these means, the Court of Cassation ensures the nationwide uniform interpretation and application of the law by all other courts and tribunals of the Belgian judicial system. The jurisdiction of the Court of Cassation is limited to decisions of judicial courts, and (notwithstanding some exceptions) does not extend to decisions of administrative courts. The Court of Cassation does however settle certain jurisdictional conflicts which may involve an administrative court. In addition, the Court of Cassation also rules on certain prejudicial questions, handles certain procedures to review old criminal cases, as well as certain proceedings against judges or prosecutors themselves. Whilst the case law of the Court of Cassation is in principle not binding for lower courts, it does hold an important persuasive value nonetheless.

=== Appellate courts ===
- Court of appeal (Dutch: hof van beroep, French: cour d'appel, German: Appellationshof): the courts of appeal are the main appellate courts in the Belgian judicial system. There is a court of appeal in each of the five respective judicial areas of Belgium. They have appellate jurisdiction over the judgements made by the tribunals of first instance and enterprise tribunals in their judicial area, except for petty cases and judgements in which a tribunal of first instance already exercised appellate review. The chambers of indictment of the courts of appeal hear appeals in judicial investigations led by an investigative judge, and decide on indictments for trials by a court of assizes. The court of appeal of Brussels also has a specific division referred to as the Market Court, which hears appeals against certain decisions made by regulators regarding regulated markets. Lastly, the courts of appeal have original jurisdiction over crimes committed by certain judicial or executive officers in or outside of the exercise of their office. Only the courts of appeal of Brussels and Liège have jurisdiction over any such crime committed by federal or regional ministers, and they can only try a minister with the permission of the legislative assembly on which their government depends. The judgements of the courts of appeal are final as to questions of fact; they can only be appealed at the Court of Cassation on questions of law.
- Court of labour (Dutch: arbeidshof, French: cour du travail, German: Arbeitsgerichtshof): the courts of labour are the appellate courts in the Belgian judicial system that hear appeals against judgements of the labour tribunals in their judicial area. There is a court of labour in each of the five respective judicial areas of Belgium, just like the courts of appeal. They have appellate jurisdiction over all judgements of the labour tribunals without any exceptions. An important aspect of the courts of labour is the involvement of lay judges appointed on the advice of employers' organisations and trade unions. The judgements of the courts of labour are final as to questions of fact; they can only be appealed at the Court of Cassation on questions of law.

=== Trial courts ===
- Court of assizes (Dutch: hof van assisen, French: cour d'assises, German: Assisenhof): the courts of assizes are the highest criminal courts and the only courts that hold jury trials in the Belgian judicial system. There is a court of assizes in each of the ten provinces of Belgium, and one in the arrondissement of Brussels-Capital (which is not part of any province). The courts of assizes are the only courts in Belgium for which the provinces are used as territorial subdivisions. They are not permanent courts; a new court is assembled for each new trial. They are composed of three judges (from the courts of appeal and the tribunals of first instance) and a jury of twelve jurors. Only the jury acts as the trier of fact, and together with the three judges the penalty is determined. The courts of assizes have original jurisdiction over non-correctionalised crimes, which are the most serious types of crimes under Belgian criminal law, as well as over civil damages arising from a crime tried by these courts. Correctionalisation refers to the process which allows for crimes to be tried by the tribunals of first instance instead of the courts of assizes. In practice, most crimes are correctionalised due to the heavy burden an assizes trial imposes on the judicial system. The courts of assizes also have exclusive jurisdiction over political crimes and press crimes by virtue of the Belgian Constitution, which mandates a jury trial for these types of crimes. Suspects cannot be tried by a court of assizes without a prior indictment by the chamber of indictment of a court of appeal. The judgements of the courts of assizes are final as to questions of fact; they can only be appealed at the Court of Cassation on questions of law.
- Tribunal of first instance (Dutch: rechtbank van eerste aanleg, French: tribunal de première instance, German: Gericht erster Instanz):
- Labour tribunal (Dutch: arbeidsrechtbank, French: tribunal du travail, German: Arbeitsgericht):
- Enterprise tribunal (Dutch: ondernemingsrechtbank, French: tribunal de l'entreprise, German: Unternehmensgericht):
- Arrondissement tribunal (Dutch: arrondissementsrechtbank, French: tribunal d'arrondissement, German: Bezirksgericht):

=== Minor jurisdiction ===
- Police tribunal (Dutch: politierechtbank, French: tribunal de police, German: Polizeigericht): the police tribunals serve as the traffic courts and lowest criminal courts in the Belgian judicial system. There is a police tribunal in each judicial arrondissement, most of which have multiple seats (each with jurisdiction over their part of the territory of their arrondissement). Due to the sensitive political situation in and around Brussels, there are four police tribunals in the arrondissement of Brussels however. They have original jurisdiction over contraventions, which are the lowest types of crimes under Belgian criminal law, as well as over all cases arising from traffic violations or traffic accidents (both civil and criminal). They also have appellate jurisdiction over certain administrative penalties imposed by municipalities or specific administrative entities. Their judgements can generally be appealed at the tribunals of first instance, except for petty cases and appellate judgements on administrative penalties.
- Justice of the peace (Dutch: vredegerecht, French: justice de paix, German: Friedensgericht): the justices of the peace serve as the small claims courts in the Belgian judicial system. There is a justice of the peace in each judicial canton, of which there are 187 as of 2017 (some with multiple seats). They have original jurisdiction over civil cases in which the disputed amount does not exceed 5,000 euro as of 2018, except for the matters over which another court or tribunal has exclusive jurisdiction. They have original jurisdiction as well as over civil cases involving certain matters irrespective of the disputed amount, such as the renting or leasing of real estate, evictions, easement, land consolidation, consumer credit or unpaid utility bills. They also have original jurisdiction in certain matters of family law, most notably legal guardianships for incapacitated seniors and the involuntary commitment of the mentally ill. They do not have any jurisdiction over criminal cases. The judgements of the justices of the peace can, with some exceptions, be appealed at the tribunals of first instance.

=== Legal help ===
Legal help can be obtained from a house of justice (Dutch: justitiehuis, French: maison de justice, German: justizhaus), of which there is one in each judicial arrondissement and 2 in the arrondissement of Brussels (a Dutch- and French-speaking one).

=== Situation before 2014 ===
	Social law	Commercial law	Civil law	Criminal law
Federal territory	Court of Cassation (Hof van Cassatie / Cour de cassation); Social Chamber — Civil and Commercial Chamber — Criminal Chamber			
Judicial areas (5)	Court of labour (Arbeidshof / Cour du travail)	Court of Appeal (Hof van beroep / Cour d'appel)		
Provinces/Brussels (11)				Court of assizes (Hof van Assisen / Cour d'Assises), a jury trial for felonies and political trials
Judicial arrondissements (27)	Labour Court (Arbeidsrechtbank / Tribunal du travail)	Business Court (Ondernemingsrechtbank / Tribunal de l’entreprise)	Tribunal of first instance (Rechtbank van eerste aanleg / Tribunal de première instance)	
1-3 per judicial arrondissement (35)			Police tribunal (Politierechtbank / Tribunal de police)	
Judicial cantons (225)		Justice of the peace (Vrederechter / justice de la Paix)		

== Special jurisdictions ==
The Constitutional Court (Grondwettelijk Hof / Cour constitutionelle) is a special court which rules on conflicts between the federal level and regional level, as well as on any law that may violate fundamental rights. The court was created as part of the federalisation of the country. It is not part of the normal judicial system; it's a court sui generis.

The government of Belgium also has a lot of administrative courts, of which the Council of State (Raad van State / Conseil d'État) is the supreme one.

== International courts ==
As a member state of several international organisations, their international courts also have jurisdiction in Belgium:

- Benelux Court of Justice
- Court of Justice of the European Union
- European Court of Human Rights of the Council of Europe

== See also ==
- Law of Belgium
- High Council of Justice (Belgium)
- List of Belgian judges
