= Employment policy in the Republic of Ireland =

Legislation relating to employment in the Republic of Ireland governs the provision and content of the contract of employment, payment of wages, length of the working day and working week, and dismissal procedures.

== Individual labor relations ==
The provision of different forms of employment protections in individual labor relations is set by a range of legislative acts, mostly deriving from EU directives. The Terms of Employment (Information) Act 1994 and 2001, stipulates that each employer must provide an employee with a document stating the basic terms of the contract of employment specifically the date of commencement, job title, pay details, place of work, terms and conditions pertaining to the hours of works and the period of time required to be give notice to the employee and the employee if the contract is to be terminated.

Under the Payment of Wages Act 1991, methods for paying wages include commission, bonus payments, holiday pay and sick pay. It does not cover expenses, pensions, or benefits of any other kind. Additionally, the legislation prohibits the reductions of an employee's wage level without their consent or prior agreement, unless under special circumstances or authorized by the virtue of the statute.

The Organization of Working Time Act 1997 pertains to the number of working works employees may achieve. The legislation states that the maximum average working week for employee cannot exceed 48 hours. There are three methods for calculating this average:over a four-month period for most employees, over a six-month period for any worker employed in hospitals, prisons, gas/electricity, airport/docks, agriculture, the security industry, or businesses which have peak periods at specific times of the year, and over a twelve-month period under circumstances in which both the employer and employee have agreed to such a provision.

The twelve-month period required approval from the Labour Court. The calculation does not include annual leave, sick leave, or maternity/adoptive/parental leave. On a daily basis, an employer can not require an employee to work more than four hours and thirty minutes without a break of at least fifteen minutes. Nor may an employee require an employee to work a period of more than six hours without a break of at least thirty minutes. Under this legislation employers are also eligible for a specific number of rest periods during the workday and between each work day. Employees are also entitled to four weeks of paid vacation and nine additional public holidays.

The Unfair Dismissals Act 1977 to 2005 pertains to contract terminations that do not involve resignation or retirement. Under the Unfair Dismissals Act, employees are protected from dismissal if there is a lack of substantial justification for the termination of an employee contract. Unfair dismissal can be justified if the employer can prove the decision was based on the capability and or the competence of in the qualifications of the employee for the work they were employed to do, the employee's conduct, redundancy, or the fact that the continuation of the employment would contravene another statutory requirement.

Additionally, employees are protected if the employer did not follow fair and legal procedures during the process of dismissal. If either of these two conditions are met, an employee may appeal to an Employment Appeal Tribunal which oversees claims of unfair dismissal. The Employment Appeals Tribunal consists of a chairman, Vice Chairman together with an equal number of members selected by the Irish Congress of Trade Unions and various employer organizations. If the tribunal find in favor of the employee, they can be entitled to reinstatement or be awarded compensation up to a maximum of two years' remuneration.
