= Labor court =

A labor court (or labour court or industrial tribunal) is a governmental judiciary body which rules on labor or employment related matters and disputes. In a number of countries, labor cases are often taken to separate national labor high courts. Other states, such as the United States, possess general non-judiciary labour relations boards which govern union certifications and elections.

== List of existing labor courts ==
- Labour Court of Ireland
- Labour Court (Iceland)
- Federal Labor Court of Germany
- Labour Court and Labour Appeal Court of South Africa
- Labor Courts of Israel
- Labour Court of Finland
- Court of labour and Labour Court of Belgium
- Superior Labor Court and Regional Labor Courts of Brazil
- Labor Court of Monaco
- Professions Court in Quebec, Canada
- Employment Tribunal in England and Wales, United Kingdom
- Conseil de prud'hommes, in France
- Labour Court of Sweden
- Labour Court of India
- National Industrial Court of Nigeria
- Labour Court of Malaysia

=== Non-judicial courts or tribunals ===
- Fair Work Commission, Australia
- National Labor Relations Board, United States
- National Labor Relations Commission, Philippines
