= Maria Vindevoghel =

Belgian politician (born 1957)

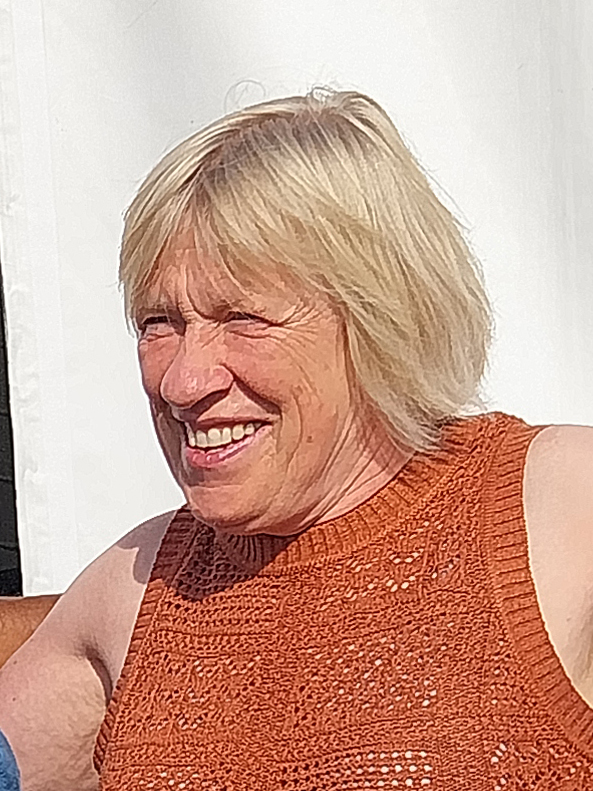
- Vindevoghel in 2023

Member of the Chamber of Representatives
- Incumbent
- Assumed office 20 June 2019
- Parliamentary group: 55th
- Constituency: Brussels

Personal details
- Born: 11 October 1957 (age 68) Waregem, Belgium
- Party: Workers' Party of Belgium

Maria Vindevoghel (born 11 October 1957) is a Belgian shop steward and politician affiliated with the Workers' Party of Belgium.

== Biography ==
Maria Vindevoghel was born in Waregem, Belgium, and grew up in a primarily farming family in West Flanders. At 20, she moved to Brussels at Molenbeek-Saint-Jean.

Vindevoghel became an aircraft cleaner at Sabena. After the bankruptcy of the airline in 2001, she gained some notoriety as a spokeswoman for Sabena employees. Proceedings were brought before the Labour Court by the ex-Sabenians because the government Verhofstadt I would not have respected the social plan. The Belgian Government argued that the Federal Government had indeed made a mistake, but also put the 31 former employees of the bankrupt airline in the wrong.

She then became a cleaner at baggage handler FlightCare. In the summer of 2005, she was fired there, according to the management of FlightCare because of repeated violations of safety regulations. However, she managed to successfully challenge her dismissal at the labor court, with the judge stating that there was discrimination. From 2007 to 2017, Vindevoghel worked at the trade union ACV, where she focused on women's work and the aviation sector. She took early retirement in 2017. She also engaged with civil movement Heart over Hard.

In the federal elections, she appeared in the electoral district of Brussels-Halle-Vilvoorde with her own electoral list "Movement for Action, Resistance and an Independent Alternative" (MARIA), which however did not reach the electoral threshold. The list received 4,298 preferred votes (0.51%) for the Chamber of Representatives in the Brussels-Halle-Vilvoorde constituency and 2142 (0.67%) in the Leuven constituency. In Schaerbeek in 2003, MARIA initially received 4096 additional votes because of a voting computer error caused by cosmic radiation. In the federal elections of May 2019, she was again a candidate as Lijsttrekker of the PVDA-PTB list in the constituency of Brussels-Capital. She became elected to the House of Representatives.

=== Federal deputy ===
In the federal parliamentary elections 2019, she was elected as a Workers' Party of Belgium member of parliament in the Chambre des représentants. She deals with issues related to mobility, public enterprises and federal institutions within the PTB group.

=== Parliamentary activities ===
On 20 June 2019, when taking the oath in the Chamber of Representatives, she mixed Dutch and French ("Ik zweer de observer de grondwet) so as not to choose one of the language groups. However, she was forced to take the oath again and did so in Dutch, joining the Dutch language group.

On 19 March 2020, Vindevoghel, together with the Workers' Party of Belgium, New Flemish Alliance and Vlaams Belang groups in the House of Representatives voted against the confidence to the Wilmès II Government.

During the 2024 European Parliament elections, Vindevoghel served as a Lijstduwer in the Dutch ballots, and was not elected.

== Bibliography ==
- Ik beschuldig... in naam van de Sabeniens; EPO; 2003; ISBN 9064452938
- Fiche Maria Vindevoghel PVDA
- Pardoen Tom; "PVDA-verkozenen Nadia Moscufo en Maria Vindevoghel van de werkvloer naar het Parlement: 'Er heerst echt woede op straat, van wie weinig heeft tegen wie veel heeft'"; HUMO; 3 June 2019
