= Social Support Act 2015 =

Dutch law]

The Social Support Act 2015 (WMO 2015) is a Dutch law that was introduced on January 1, 2015, and is the successor of the Social Support Act, which was introduced on January 1, 2007. The law is the basis of the system of care and welfare, including Mantelzorg. This system also coexists with the WMO in 2015 from the Long term care Act and the Health Insurance Act.

The previous entitlements such as those for household help, have been replaced by a bespoke provision for those who do not really need and can pay from their own resources. The provisions now differ more from municipality to municipality.
