= Public Centre for Social Welfare =

Welfare organization in Belgium

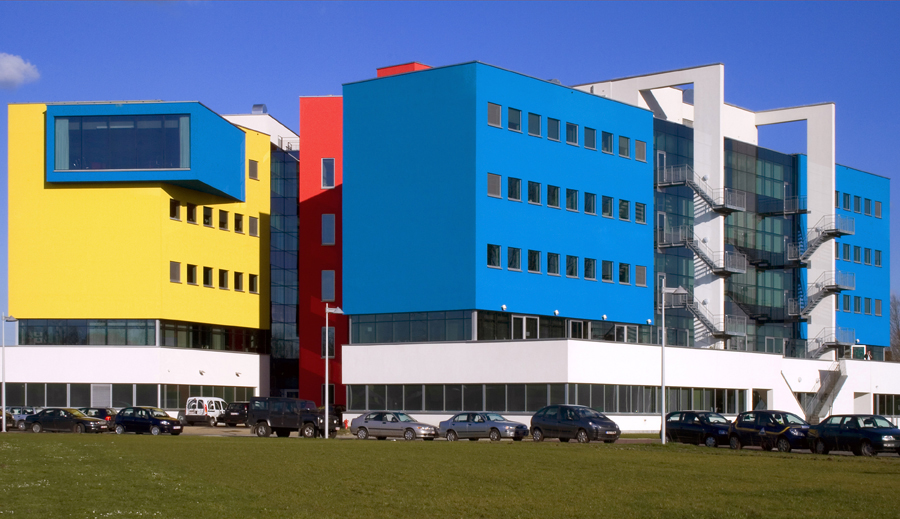
The OCMW centre of Bruges

The Public Centre for Social Welfare (Dutch: Openbaar Centrum voor Maatschappelijk Welzijn, OCMW; French: Centre public d'action sociale, CPAS; German: Öffentliches Sozialhilfezentrum, ÖSHZ) is a public institution that exists in each of the 581 municipalities of Belgium. Every citizen of Belgium has the right to social assistance and social integration.

Examples of social services provided by the OCMW/CPAS are financial help, medical help, housing and legal advice. Those who do not have sufficient means to live on receive a minimum income (Dutch: leefloon, French: revenu d'intégration).

Each municipality has, to complement the municipal council, a separate OCMW/CPAS council, appointed by the municipal council, not directly elected, except in the municipalities with language facilities of Voeren, Comines-Warneton and the six of the Brussels Periphery. The council is composed of 9 to 15 members depending on the population of the municipality. The fact that OCMW/CPAS is a separate institution from the municipalities is historical. In other countries, such social services are given by the municipalities themselves.

The three Belgian regions (Flanders, Brussels and Wallonia) are responsible for most local government matters. The Flemish Government plans to abolish its OCMW and integrate them into their respective municipalities by 1 January 2019.

== See also ==
- Healthcare in Belgium
