= Flemish insurance for non-medical care =

In the federal state of Belgium, healthcare is managed by the federal level. The Flemish Government introduced an additional insurance for non-medical care (Dutch: zorgverzekering) in 2001, which proved to be controversial and has a relatively long legal history.

Healthcare and social security in Belgium are federal matters, but the special law of Belgium grants the three communities several competences like "assistance to persons". The Flemish government made use of that to provide an additional insurance for nonmedical help and services, which is mainly targeted at elderly people. The insurance is mandatory for people aged 25 and above living in the Flemish Region and optional for inhabitants of the Brussels-Capital Region (as Brussels is covered by both the Flemish and French Community).

The Walloon region has tried to annul the decree that regulates Flemish health insurance. The Constitutional Court dismissed this appeal. Since 2017, the Walloon Region has its own health insurance.

== Controversy and legal issues ==
The French Community, however, feared that was a first step towards splitting the Belgian social security and found the service to be discriminatory. It fought this at the Constitutional Court, and tried to come up with legal arguments to repeal the decree, as laws by communities and regions are called, but to no avail. The system was however slightly adapted several times to suit their justified complaints.

The Constitutional Court sent a prejudicial question to the European Court of Justice, which inspected the decree. It considered this insurance to be social security, as opposed to Belgian terms, and it judged that the "place of residence criteria" as used in the decree (the insurance is for those living in Flanders or Brussels) violated the "workplace criteria" that EU law dictates for social security for EU citizens who made use of their right of freedom of movement. People working in a country in which they do not live must enjoy the same social rights as citizens of that state. Consequently, the Flemish decree was adapted to provide the insurance also for people working in Flanders or Brussels but not living there, as long as they made use of their right of free movement. Since EU law recognises only "Belgium", not the various entities within it, that does not include Walloons working in Flanders. As a result, anyone living or working in Flanders or Brussels can enjoy the insurance except Walloons, unless they make use of their right of free movement.

In January 2009, the final judgment of the Court of Arbitration came, meanwhile renamed the Constitutional Court. It ruled that the health insurance in itself is legal, but it had to be adapted again to comply with European regulations. The health insurance decree was amended by decree of 30 April 2009.
