= Arrondissement Court (Belgium) =

The Arrondissement Court (Dutch: Arrondissementsrechtbank, French: Tribunal d'arrondissement, German: Bezirksgericht) in Belgium is a court which deals with disputes of competence between the Court of First Instance, the Commercial Court and the Labour Court of a judicial arrondissement. It consists of the Presidents of the Court of First Instance, the Commercial Court and the Labour Court.

In principle, the decisions of the Arrondissement Court are not subject to appeal. Only the Prosecutor-General at the Court of Appeal can appeal against its decisions before the Court of Cassation.
