= SIS Card =

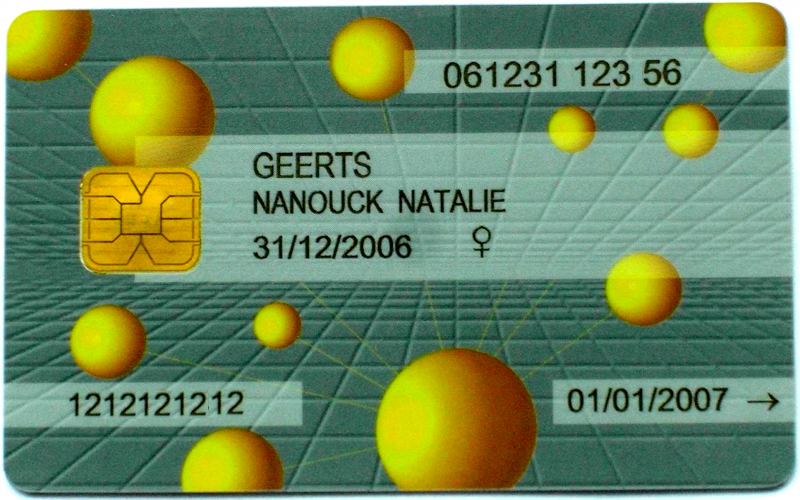
- SIS Card
- Type: Medical identification
- Issued by: BEL
- First issued: 1998
- Purpose: Reductions in hospitals and pharmacies and recording of a patient's medical history
- Valid in: European Union
- Eligibility: Living in Belgium (1998–2013)
- Expiration: 10 years after issue or December 31, 2016 whichever is earlier

The SIS Card (SIS = Sociaal Informatie Systeem / Système Information Social, English: Social Information System) in Belgium was a chip card system. The cards were credit card size and were used to prove the rights of the cardholder (or their legal guardian, for minors) to access the social security system when spending on medicine.

The card was first issued in 1998 for all people living in Belgium. From October 1, 1998 it was compulsory for every Belgian citizen to possess a SIS card.

In August 2011, it was announced that soon, new cards would no longer be issued. Starting on January 1, 2012, citizens wishing to do so, (and with their doctor's or pharmacist's agreement) could show their ID card instead of SIS. However, a doctor or pharmacist could not refuse a SIS card and had the right to refuse to accept an ID card.

The Belgian Federal Government officially announced a gradual phaseout of the traditional SIS card, initiating a transition to an electronic ID based system, on 1 January 2014. This was outlined in a Cabinet-approved proposal from the Minister of Social Affairs. On January 1, 2017, all still active cards expired and could no longer be accepted. The card was replaced by the new isi+ Card.
