= Mantelzorg =

Mantelzorg (literally: “cloak care”) is a Dutch term introduced by Johannes Hattinga Verschure in 1972. It describes the system of informal social care in the Netherlands.

Informal care is care for people who are chronically ill, disabled and in need that is provided by relatives, friends, acquaintances and neighbours. Typically, there is a pre-existing personal relationship between the caregiver and the person receiving care. This care is normally unpaid.

In the Netherlands, 3.6 million people care for another person in this way. Around 1.1 million caregivers provide more than 8 hours per week of care lasting for more than three months. 450 000 carers feel burdened or overburdened. Most carers find it natural to care for their neighbour but run into numerous problems. Difficulties include combining caring with paid employment, temporary transfer to caring and, for many carers, incurring extra costs.

Every year in the Netherlands Dag van de Mantelzorg, Carers Day, is celebrated. Across the country activities are organized for carers. This day is part of the Week of the Chronically Ill, in November.

In Flanders there are six associations that represent the interests of carers (Steunpunt Mantelzorg, Samana, Liever Thuis LM, Ons Zorgnetwerk, S-Plus Mantelzorg, Okra-Zorgrecht). Additionally, the 'Vlaams Expertisepunt Mantelzorg' collects information, publications, tools and tips about family care.

== Mantelzorg House ==
For the construction or installation of a home for a caregiver for someone in the grounds of a house who needs care or vice versa no environmental permit is required. However, building regulations do apply. If the care stops the building does not need to be removed, but it needs to be changed so that it is no longer a home. For example, it may be necessary to remove the kitchen and bathroom, downgrading it to the status of a shed.

== Complement informal care and eventual reduction of the inheritance tax ==
In the Netherlands Government under the Social Support Act 2015, specified in Article 6a and beyond the control social support, to a person who provides care provide care complement. The condition is that the CIZ or youth care agency is registered for at least 371 days for outpatient care under the Exceptional Medical Expenses Act.

It holds both a very low benefit in (2012: €200) as a token of appreciation; a groomed can make providing this once a year to one carer; a caregiver that provides for more people can get the benefit per annum once. If the caregiver and the cared for relatives in the straight line and kept his wealth then, however, in the event that took care of the next calendar year dies under conditions far greater financial interest. In the case that the caregiver a joint household has the cared then the volunteer complement one of the conditions as partners for the purposes of inheritance tax to apply. This may result in more than €100,000 will be avoided in inheritance tax. The tax website suggests that the money received must be in the year of death. In parliamentary questions to Minister Martin van Rijn, disputed that the award must be done in the year prior to death. Not the amount itself in the prior year must be received."

Each year more than 300,000 volunteer complements are provided.

A carer of a care recipient with an intramural AWBZ indication who has not yet been admitted to an institution but was previously on a waiting list is not eligible for a care complement.

The Social Support Act 2015 provides that the national system will be replaced by new, local versions of the volunteer complement. Any reduction of the inheritance tax was thereby abolished.

== Mantelzorg Penalty ==
The Dutch Senate had a bill pending that older people who move in with their children from July 2015 monthly 300 euro briefly on their state pension. State Secretary Jetta Klijnsma got no majority for its proposal in the Senate and decided on May 28, 2014, to postpone the penalty for a year.
