= Labour Tribunal (Belgium) =

The Labour Court (Dutch: Arbeidsrechtbank, French: Tribunal du travail, German: Arbeitsgericht) in Belgium is a court which deals in first instance with disputes between employers and employees and disputes regarding social security. There is a Labour Court in each Judicial Arrondissement of Belgium. It is not a division of the Court of First Instance. The decisions of the Labour Court can be appealed to the Court of Labour (Dutch: Arbeidshof, French: Cour du travail, German: Arbeitsgerichtshof).
