= List of Belgian royal consorts =

Spouses of Belgian monarchs

The wives of Belgian monarchs have all been titled Queen and styled Majesty, with the exception of Leopold III of Belgium's second wife Mary Lilian Baels, who was titled Princess of Belgium and Princess of Réthy. All Belgian monarchs so far have been male, so there have only been female consorts. There have been seven queen consorts of Belgium since 1832.

Picture	Coat of Arms	Name	Father	Birth	Marriage	Became Consort	Ceased to be Consort	Death	Spouse
		Louise-Marie Thérèse Charlotte Isabelle of Orléans	Louis Philippe I of France (Orléans)	3 April 1812	9 August 1832		11 October 1850		Leopold I
		Marie Henriette Anne of Austria	Archduke Joseph, Palatine of Hungary (Habsburg-Lorraine)	23 August 1836	22 August 1853	17 December 1865 husband's ascension	19 September 1902		Leopold II
		Elisabeth Gabriele Valérie Marie in Bavaria	Duke Karl-Theodor in Bavaria (Wittelsbach)	25 July 1876	2 October 1900	23 December 1909 husband's ascension	17 February 1934 husband's death	23 November 1965	Albert I
		Astrid Sofia Lovisa Thyra of Sweden	Prince Carl, Duke of Västergötland (Bernadotte)	17 November 1905	4 November 1926	23 February 1934 husband's ascension	29 August 1935		Leopold III
		Mary Lilian Henriette Lucie Josephine Ghislaine Baels (as title of princess)	Henri Baels	28 November 1916	6 December 1941		16 July 1951 husband's abdication	7 June 2002	Leopold III
		Fabiola Fernanda María-de-las-Victorias Antonia Adelaida de Mora y Aragón	Don Gonzalo de Mora y Fernández, 4th Marquess of Casa Riera (Casa Riera)	11 June 1928	15 December 1960		31 July 1993 husband's death	5 December 2014	Baudouin
		Paola Margherita Maria-Antonia Consiglia Ruffo di Calabria	Fulco Ruffo di Calabria, 6th Duke of Guardia Lombarda (Ruffo di Calabria)	11 September 1937	2 July 1959	9 August 1993 husband's ascension	21 July 2013 husband's abdication		Albert II
		Mathilde Marie Christine Ghislaine d'Udekem d'Acoz	Count Patrick d'Udekem d'Acoz (d'Udekem d'Acoz family)	20 January 1973	4 December 1999	21 July 2013 husband's ascension	present		Philippe

== See also ==
- Duchess of Brabant
- Countess of Flanders
- Countess of Hainaut
