= Lilian Baels =

Second wife of Leopold III of Belgium (1916–2002)

Lilian
- Princess of Réthy
- Photo of Lilian as Princess de Réthy

Consort of the Belgian monarch
- Tenure: 6 December 1941 – 16 July 1951
- Born: Mary Lilian Henriette Lucie Josephine Ghislaine Baels; 28 November 1916; Highbury, London, England
- Died: 7 June 2002 (aged 85); Domaine d'Argenteuil, Waterloo, Belgium
- Burial: Church of Our Lady of Laeken
- Spouse: Leopold III of Belgium (m. 1941; died 1983)
- Issue: Prince Alexandre; Princess Marie-Christine, Mrs. Gourgues; Princess Marie-Esméralda, Lady Moncada
- Father: Henri Baels
- Mother: Anne Marie de Visscher

Lilian, Princess of Réthy (born Mary Lilian Henriette Lucie Josephine Ghislaine Baels; 28 November 1916 – 7 June 2002) was the second wife of King Leopold III of Belgium. Born in the United Kingdom and raised in Belgium, she became a volunteer as a car driver who transported wounded Belgians and French to the hospital in Bruges during World War II. Lilian married King Leopold III in 1941 and became consort of the Belgian monarch. The couple had three children. She was also a stepmother to Leopold III's children from Queen Astrid who had died in a 1935 traffic crash, and became the "first lady" of Belgium during the first nine years of her stepson King Baudouin's reign. Her charity work revolved around medicine and cardiology.

== Early life and education ==
Mary Lilian Lucy Josepha Monique Baels was born in Highbury, London, England, where her parents had fled during World War I. She was one of the nine children of Henri Baels from Ostend and his wife, Anne Marie de Visscher, from Dentergem.

Her mother, Anne Marie, was born into a prominent bourgeois family, the daughter of a mayor and the granddaughter of a minister. Through her, among her ancestors was Félix Amandus, Count de Muelenaere, a member of the Belgian nobility, who served in the National Congress that established the Kingdom of Belgium and was Prime Minister of Belgium as well as Foreign Minister on three occasions between 1831 and 1841.

Lilian was initially educated in English, but, upon her parents' return to Belgium, she attended the College of the Sacred Heart in Ostend, where she learned Dutch. Lilian continued her studies in French at the Institute of the Sacred Heart in Brussels. She was also fluent in German. Lilian completed her education by attending a convent school in London and attending finishing schools in France, Switzerland and Austria.

In addition to academic work, Lilian participated extensively in sports, such as skiing, swimming, golfing, and hunting. Above all, however, she enjoyed, as did her father, literature and the arts.

As a teenager, she was presented to King George V and Queen Mary of the United Kingdom at Buckingham Palace.

== Friendship with the Belgian royal family ==
In 1933, Lilian Baels, as a student at the Institute of the Sacred Heart, saw her future husband King Leopold III of Belgium, then the Duke of Brabant, for the first time during a military review that was conducted by King Albert I at the location near to the school. Leopold was at the time married to Astrid of Sweden. When the students in her class were given the task of writing an essay on a topic of their choice, Lilian decided to write on the then-Prince Leopold. A few years later, when her father, then Governor of West Flanders, took his daughter to a public ceremony, she had the occasion to meet King Leopold, who presided at the event, for the second time.

In 1937, again on another ceremonial occasion, Lilian and her mother met the King, who was now a widower after Queen Astrid's death in an automobile accident in 1935. Soon afterwards, King Leopold III contacted Governor Baels to invite him and his daughter to join him in a golfing party the next day. Lilian also saw the King in 1939 at a garden-party organised in honour of Queen Wilhelmina of the Netherlands, and later at the golf course at Laeken, where she was invited to lunch by King Leopold's mother, Queen Elisabeth of Belgium. A final golf party near the Belgian coast occurred in May 1940, just before the Nazi invasion of Belgium.

== Beginnings of World War II in Belgium ==
Following the Nazi invasion of Belgium, Lilian's mother put herself at the service of the Red Cross during the Belgian and Allied military campaign against the invaders. Lilian helped her mother actively in her new role, transporting wounded Belgian and French to the hospital of St. John in Bruges by car and helped to evacuate the elderly from an asylum in Aalst, which was inside the combat zone. Meanwhile, her father, Governor Baels, attempted to alleviate the plight of his invaded province. On 18 May, Henri Baels went in search of the Minister of the Interior, thinking he had left for France, to obtain his signature for an important relief measure. On his journey, however, Governor Baels had a car accident and injured his legs. He was admitted to a hospital in Le Havre. As the military situation in Belgium headed towards disaster, his wife decided to bring her daughters to safety in France, and Lilian drove the family car on the trip. Governor Baels' wife and daughters met him again, by pure chance, in a hospital in Poitiers. Baels was subsequently accused of having abandoned his post as Governor without justification by fleeing to France. He succeeded, however, in obtaining an audience with the King following the capitulation of the Belgian army on 28 May 1940 and the King's own imprisonment by the Germans at Laeken Castle. Baels and his daughter Lilian, who drove him to the audience, explained the real circumstances of his departure from Belgium, and the Governor was thereby vindicated. Subsequently, Lilian and her father returned to France and occupied themselves with the care of Belgian refugees in the region of Anglet. After Belgium's liberation, Henri Baels was accused of collaborating with the Nazis during the war, while he lived in France.

== Marriage and controversy ==
In 1941, at the invitation of Queen Elisabeth, Lilian visited Laeken Castle, where King Leopold III, now a prisoner of war, was held by the Germans under house arrest. This visit was followed by several others, with the result that Leopold III and Lilian fell in love. Leopold proposed marriage to Lilian in July 1941, but Lilian declined his offer because "Kings only marry princesses," she said. Queen Elisabeth, however, prevailed upon Lilian to accept the King's offer. Lilian agreed to marry the King, but declined the title of queen. Instead, the King gave Lilian the title Princess of Belgium, a.k.a. Princess of Réthy, with the style Royal Highness. It was agreed that descendants of the King's new marriage would be titled Prince/Princess of Belgium with the style Royal Highness but excluded from succession to the throne.

Leopold and Lilian initially planned to hold their official, civil marriage after the end of the war and the liberation of Belgium, but in the meantime, a secret religious marriage ceremony took place on 11 September 1941, in the chapel of Laeken Castle, in the presence of King Leopold's mother Queen Elisabeth, Lilian's father Henri Baels, Cardinal van Roey (who worked as the Archbishop of Mechelen and primate of Belgium) and one of the King's old friends. Lilian was wearing Queen Elisabeth's bridal veil during her wedding. This actually contravened Belgian law, which required that the religious wedding be preceded by the civil one. Although Lilian and Leopold had originally planned to postpone their civil marriage until the end of the war, Lilian was soon expecting her first child, necessitating a civil marriage, which took place on 6 December 1941. The civil marriage automatically made Lilian a Belgian princess. Lilian proved a devoted wife to the King and an affectionate and vivacious stepmother to his children by his first wife, Queen Astrid. Her stepchildren—Joséphine-Charlotte, Baudouin, and Albert II—adored her and they called her "Mother".

When the civil marriage of Leopold and Lilian was made public in a pastoral letter by Cardinal van Roey read throughout Belgian churches in December 1941, there was a mixed reaction in Belgium. Some showed sympathy for the new couple, sending flowers and messages of congratulations to the palace at Laeken. Others, however, argued that the marriage was incompatible with the King's status as a prisoner of war and his stated desire to share the hard fate of his conquered people and captive army, and was a betrayal of Queen Astrid's memory. They also branded Lilian as a social-climber. One of the leading Belgian newspapers rebuked King Leopold: "Sire, we thought you had your face turned towards us in mourning. Instead you had it hidden in the shoulder of a woman." Leopold and Lilian were also blamed for violating Belgian law by holding their religious marriage before their civil one. These criticisms would continue for many years, even after the war.

According to Lilian's account, the news of her secret marriage with King Leopold upset and worried her mother, who foresaw that it would provoke a political storm. Her mother quoted "My little one, you don't know what's in store for you. It will be appalling, they will all attack you, you will have a terribly hard life." Queen Astrid's parents, Prince Carl and Princess Ingeborg of Sweden, did not take the hard line against King Leopold's remarriage. Princess Ingeborg told a Belgian journalist that she couldn't understand all the animus in Belgium against the king's second marriage, that it was perfectly natural for a young man not to want to remain alone forever. She said she was happy about her son-in-law's new marriage, both for his own sake and for the sake of her grandchildren.

== Deportation to Nazi Germany ==
In 1944, the Belgian royal family was deported to Nazi Germany, where they were strictly guarded by 70 members of the SS, under harsh conditions. The family suffered from a deficient diet and lived with the constant fear that they would be massacred by their jailers, as an act of revenge on the part of the Nazis, angered at their defeat (by now becoming increasingly certain) by the Allies, or that they would be caught in the cross-fire between Allied forces and their captors, who might try to make a desperate last stand at the site of the royal family's internment. The family's fears were not unfounded. At one point, a Nazi official tried to give them cyanide, pretending it was a mixture of vitamins to compensate for the captives' poor diet during their imprisonment. Lilian and Leopold, however, were rightly suspicious and did not take the pills or give them to their children. During their period of captivity in Germany, (and later Austria), Leopold and Lilian jointly homeschooled the royal children. The King taught scientific subjects; his wife, arts and literature. In 1945, the Belgian royal family was released by the American 106th Cavalry Regiment under the command of Lieutenant General Alexander Patch, who thereafter became a close friend of King Leopold and Princess Lilian until he died 2 months later.

== "Royal Question" and the aftermath ==
Following his liberation, King Leopold was unable to return to Belgium (by now liberated as well) due to a political controversy that arose in Belgium surrounding his actions during World War II. He was accused of having betrayed the Allies by an allegedly premature surrender in 1940 and of collaborating with the Nazis during the occupation of Belgium. In 1946, a juridical commission was constituted in Brussels to investigate the King's conduct during the war and occupation. During this period, the king and his family lived in exile in Pregny-Chambésy, Switzerland, and the King's younger brother, Prince Charles, Count of Flanders, was made regent of the country. The commission of inquiry eventually exonerated Leopold of the charges and he was able, in 1950, to return to Belgium and resume his royal duties. Political agitation against the King continued, however, leading to civil disturbances in what became known as the Royal Question. As a result, in 1951, to avoid tearing the country apart and to save the embattled monarchy, King Leopold III abdicated in favour of his 21-year-old son, Prince Baudouin.

During the first nine years of her stepson's reign, Lilian acted as "first lady" of Belgium. At the same period, Lilian also became the senior lady of the household. King Leopold and Princess Lilian continued to live in the royal palace at Laeken until Baudouin's marriage to Doña Fabiola de Mora y Aragón in 1960.

== Life in Argenteuil and charity work ==
In 1960, following the marriage of King Baudouin, Leopold and Lilian moved out of the royal palace to a government property, the estate of Argenteuil, Belgium. Lilian employed various designers to transform the dilapidated mansion on the property into a distinguished and elegant residence for the ex-King. Argenteuil became a cultural centre under the auspices of Leopold and Lilian, who cultivated the friendship of numerous prominent writers, scientists, mathematicians, and doctors. Leopold and Lilian also travelled extensively all over the world.

Following her son Prince Alexandre's heart surgery in Boston, Massachusetts in 1957, Princess Lilian became very interested in medicine, and, in particular, in cardiology, and founded a Cardiological Foundation in 1958 to promote new forms of treatment for cardiovascular diseases, which, through its work, has saved the lives of hundreds of people. Both before and after her husband's death in 1983, Lilian pursued her interests in intellectual and scientific spheres with energy and passion. Princess Lilian also personally financed a number of Belgian children who needed to go to the United States for operations. Princess Lilian and her husband appeared in public at a ceremony for the Brussels Exhibition of 1958. In 1961, Lilian inaugurated a new cardiac research laboratory at the Hospital Saint-Pierre in Brussels.

In 1962, Pan, a Belgian satirical journal, followed by two French tabloids, released a publication about the private life of Lilian. On December 31, Leopold submitted a complaint to the press. He wrote that "For more than twenty years, my wife has shared my joys and my sorrows: she has restored a home to me, she has helped me to raise the children Queen Astrid gave me, and she has consecrated herself to them with a devotion and a tenderness that have made them what they are today." He also concluded that "My wife and I wish for nothing more than to dwell in peace at Argenteuil, and devote ourselves to scientific, philanthropic and social activities in which we take a deep interest."

Her belongings from the chateau were put up at auction in Amsterdam.

== Death ==
Princess Lilian died in 2002 at the Domaine d'Argenteuil in Waterloo, Belgium. Before her death, she had expressed the desire to be buried at Argenteuil. Her wish was denied, however, and she was buried in the royal crypt of the Church of Our Lady, Laeken, Belgium, with King Leopold and his first wife, Queen Astrid. Queen Fabiola and Lilian's stepchildren attended the funeral, as did Lilian's son Alexandre and her daughter Marie-Esmeralda. Lilian's long-estranged daughter Marie-Christine did not attend.

== Legacy ==
=== Character and reputation ===
Lilian was known as a woman who was terribly strict and demanding towards herself, and, a result, as one who could be excessively severe with others as well. Due to the controversy surrounding King Leopold's wartime actions, and, in particular, his second marriage, Lilian was widely unpopular in Belgium. However, she also had a circle of close friends, who saw her as a woman of great beauty, charm, intelligence, elegance, strength of character, kindness, generosity, humor and culture. They admired her for the courage and dignity with which she faced a long series of personal attacks, both during the Royal Question and for decades afterwards. According to Queen Elisabeth's lady-in-waiting, Lilian was "a true princess in the full sense of the term."

=== Fashion ===
Jacqueline Kennedy, First Lady of the United States as wife of John F. Kennedy, cited Princess Lilian as a fashion inspiration. Lilian's wardrobe and jewelry collection were auctioned by Sotheby's in 2003.

=== Philanthropy ===
Following Princess Lilian's death, a cardiological conference was organised and prominent doctors and surgeons such as DeBakey and many others rendered an homage to Lilian and her contributions to cardiology through Cardiological Foundation.

== Children ==
Lilian had three children with King Leopold III:

- Prince Alexandre Emmanuel Henri Albert Marie Léopold of Belgium (1942–2009). Married Léa Wolman in 1991 (the marriage became public knowledge in 1998).
- Princess Marie-Christine Daphné Astrid Élisabeth Léopoldine of Belgium, born in Brussels on 6 February 1951. First marriage to Paul Drucker in 1981 (separated 1981, divorced 1985); second marriage to Jean-Paul Gourgues in 1989. Resides in Las Vegas.
- Princess Marie-Esméralda Adelaide Lilian Anne Léopoldine of Belgium, born in Brussels on 30 September 1956. Married Sir Salvador Enrique Moncada in 1998. They have two children: Alexandra and Leopoldo. A journalist, she writes under the professional name of Esmeralda de Réthy.

== Bibliography ==
- Jean Cleeremans. Léopold III, sa famille, son peuple sous l'occupation. (in French)
- Jean Cleeremans. Un royaume pour un amour: Léopold III, de l'éxil a l'abdication. (in French)
- Vincent Dujardin, Mark van de Wijngaert, et al. Léopold III
- Jacques Franck. "Souvenirs de la Princesse Lilian," published in La Libre Belgique, 29 October 2003
- Roger Keyes. Echec au Roi: Léopold III, 1940–1951.
- Claude Désiré and Marcel Jullian. Un couple dans la tempête. (in French)
- Michel Verwilghen. Le mythe d'Argenteuil: demeure d'un couple royal.
- Patrick Weber. Amours royales et princières.
