= William D. Richardson =

William D. Richardson FRS FMedSci FLS
- Born: 18 August 1951; Belfast
- Education: University of Manchester, King's College London
- Occupations: Biologist; biophysicist; university teacher
- Scientific career
- Workplaces: UCL Wolfson Institute
- Thesis: Quantitative and qualitative electron microscope observations on condensed nucleoprotein in avian Erythrocytes, and in spermatids of a mollusc, Nucella lapillus

William David Richardson FRS FLS (born 18 August 1951) has been Director of the UCL Wolfson Institute since 2012.

He was educated at the Royal Belfast Academical Institution, the University of Manchester (BSc Physics, 1973) and King's College London (PhD, 1978). He was a Lecturer in Molecular Genetics at University College London from 1985 to 1990 and has been Professor of Biology at the UCL Wolfson Institute since 1993.

He was made a Fellow of the Royal Society in 2013. He is also a Fellow of the Linnean Society of London and of the Academy of Medical Sciences.
