= Leopold III of Belgium =

King of the Belgians from 1934 to 1951

Leopold III
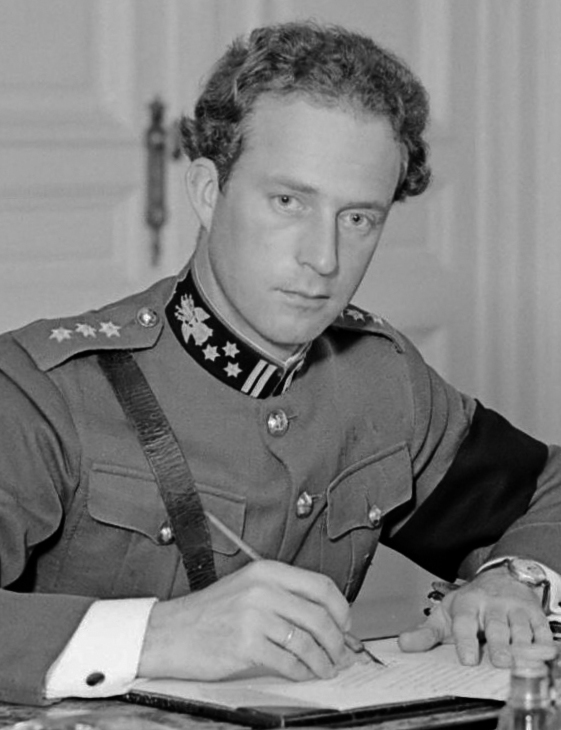
- Leopold in 1934

King of the Belgians
- Reign: 23 February 1934 – 16 July 1951
- Predecessor: Albert I
- Successor: Baudouin
- Regents: Prince Charles, Count of Flanders (1944–1950); Prince Baudouin, Duke of Brabant (1950–1951)
- Prime Ministers: See list: Charles de Broqueville Georges Theunis Paul van Zeeland Paul-Émile Janson Paul-Henri Spaak Hubert Pierlot Achille Van Acker Camille Huysmans Gaston Eyskens Jean Duvieusart Joseph Pholien
- Born: 3 November 1901; Brussels, Belgium
- Died: 25 September 1983 (aged 81); Woluwe-Saint-Lambert, Brussels, Belgium
- Burial: Church of Our Lady of Laeken
- Spouses: Astrid of Sweden (m. 1926; died 1935) Mary Lilian Baels (m. 1941)
- Issue: Joséphine-Charlotte, Grand Duchess of Luxembourg; Baudouin, King of the Belgians; Albert II, King of the Belgians; Prince Alexandre; Princess Marie-Christine, Mrs. Gourgues; Princess Marie-Esméralda, Lady Moncada
Names
- Flemish: Leopold Filips Karel Albert Meinrad Hubertus Maria Miguel; French: Léopold Philippe Charles Albert Meinrad Hubert Marie Michel; German: Leopold Philipp Karl Albrecht Meinrad Hubert Maria Michael
- House: Saxe-Coburg and Gotha (until 1920); Belgium (from 1920)
- Father: Albert I of Belgium
- Mother: Elisabeth of Bavaria

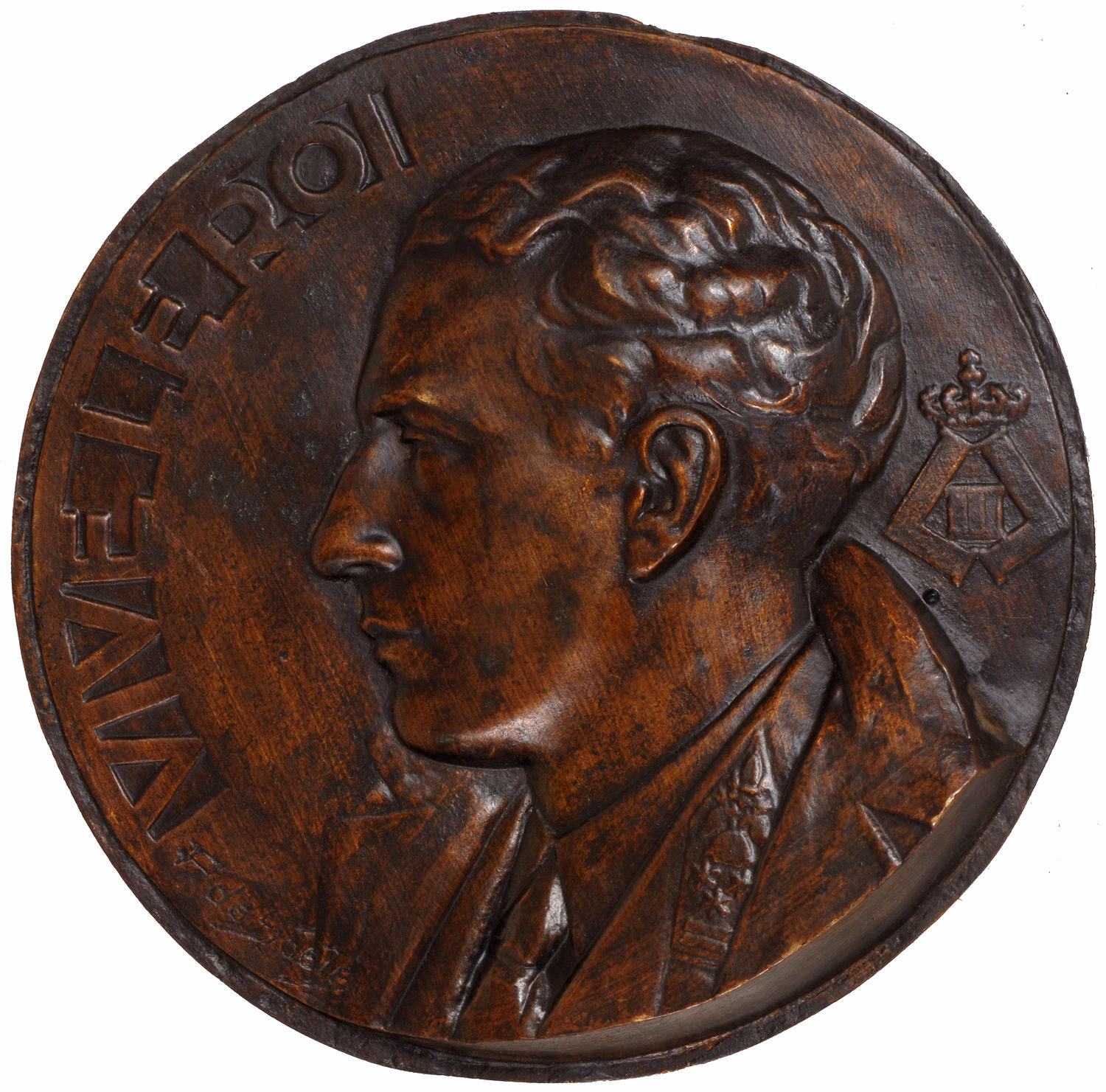
The face of Leopold III on a bas-relief by Pierre De Soete.

Leopold III (Note: French: Léopold Philippe Charles Albert Meinrad Hubert Marie Michel; Dutch: Leopold Filips Karel Albert Meinrad Hubertus Maria Miguel; German: Leopold Philipp Karl Albrecht Meinrad Hubert Maria Michael.) (3 November 1901 – 25 September 1983) was King of the Belgians from 23 February 1934 until his abdication on 16 July 1951. At the outbreak of World War II, Leopold tried to maintain Belgian neutrality, but after the German invasion in May 1940, he surrendered his country, earning him much hostility, both at home and abroad.

Leopold's act was declared unconstitutional by Prime Minister Hubert Pierlot and his cabinet, who moved to London to form a government-in-exile, while Leopold and his family were placed under house arrest by the Germans. In 1944, they were moved to Germany and then Austria, before being liberated by the Americans, but banned for some years from returning to Belgium, where his brother Prince Charles, Count of Flanders, had been declared regent. Leopold's eventual return to his homeland in 1950 nearly caused a civil war, with serious calls for a secessionist republic in Wallonia. Under pressure from the government, he abdicated in favour of his son Baudouin in July 1951.

Leopold's first wife, Astrid of Sweden, died in a road accident while on a driving holiday in Switzerland in August 1935, being much mourned by the public. Leopold, who was driving the vehicle when it hit a tree, suffered minor injuries. His morganatic second marriage, to Lilian Baels in captivity in 1941, was contrary to Belgian law, which stipulates that the civil marriage has to occur before a religious marriage, and she was never permitted the title of queen. Although Lilian and Leopold had originally planned to postpone their civil marriage until the end of the war, Lilian was soon expecting their first child, necessitating a civil marriage, which took place on 6 December 1941.

== Early life and family ==
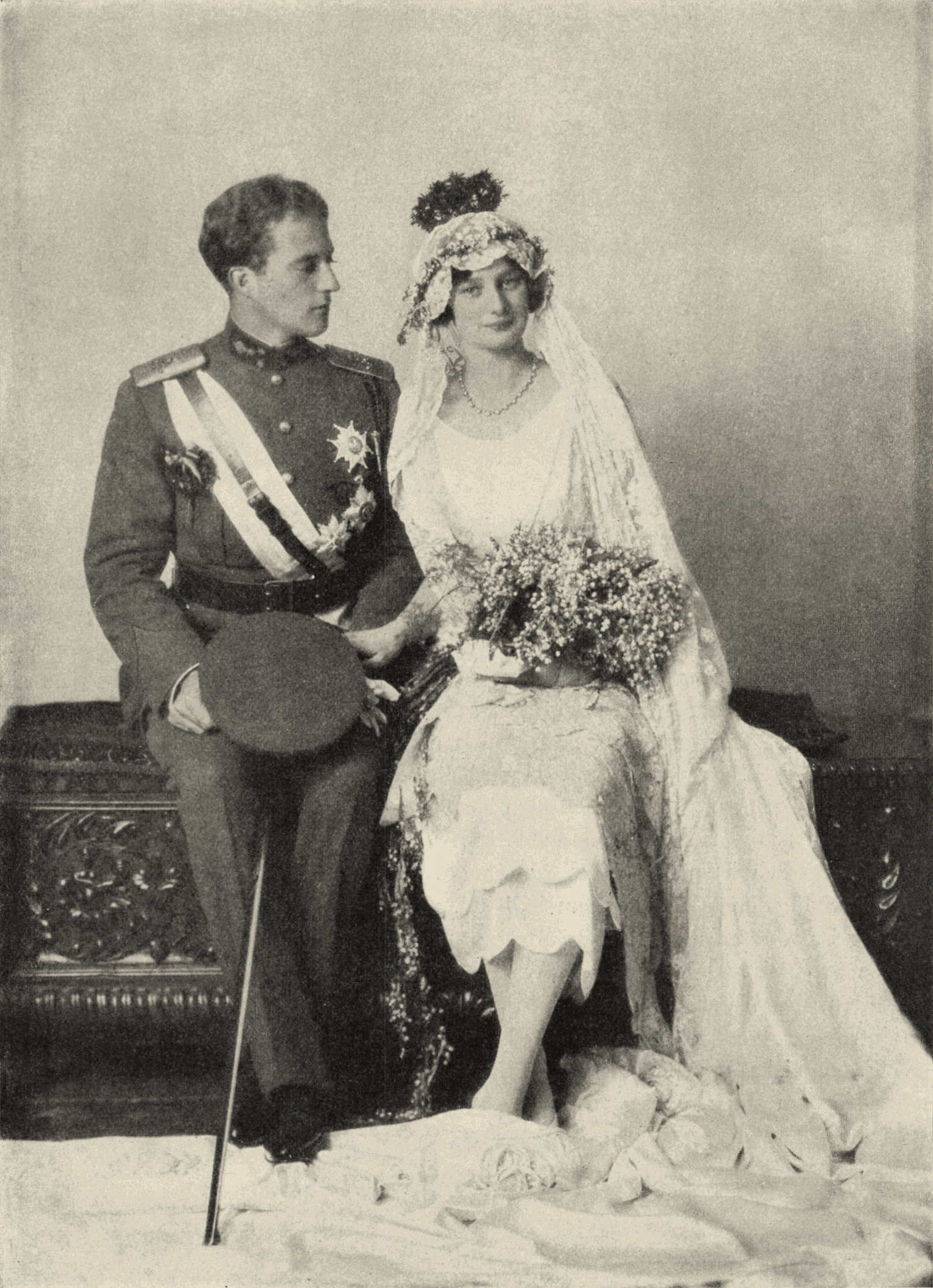
Leopold of Belgium and Astrid of Sweden on their wedding day.

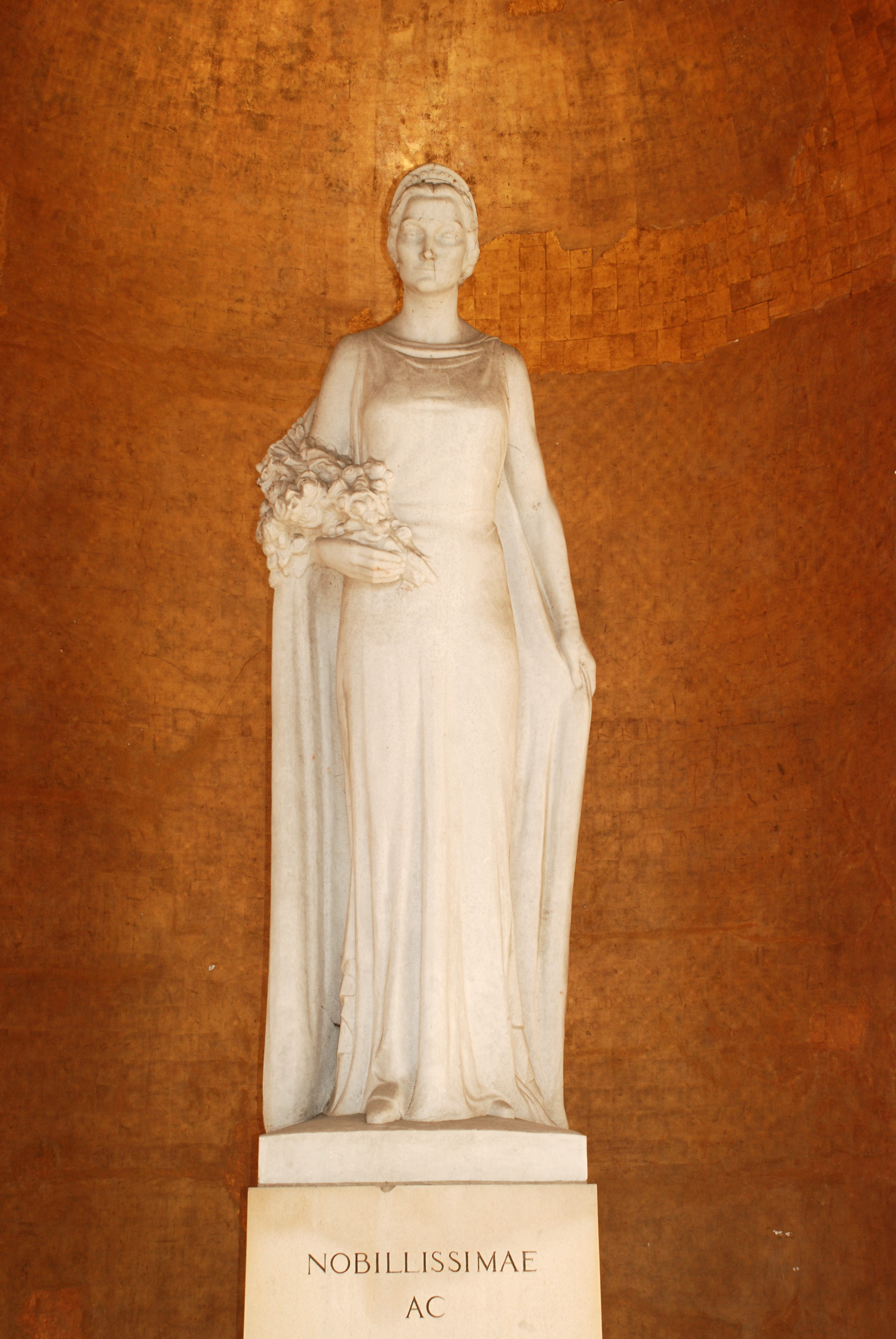
Queen Astrid Memorial in Brussels.

Prince Leopold was born in Brussels, the first child of Prince Albert, heir to the Belgian throne, and his consort, Duchess Elisabeth of Bavaria. In 1909 his father became King of the Belgians, as Albert I, and Prince Leopold became Duke of Brabant.

In August 1914, when Belgium was invaded by Germany, King Albert allowed Leopold, then aged twelve, to enlist in the Belgian army as a private and fight in defence of the kingdom. However, in 1915, with Belgium almost entirely occupied by the Germans, Leopold was sent to attend Eton College, while his father fought on in France.

After the war, in 1919, the Duke of Brabant visited the Old Mission and Saint Anthony Seminary in Santa Barbara, California.

He married Princess Astrid of Sweden in a civil ceremony in Stockholm on 4 November 1926, followed by a religious ceremony in Brussels on 10 November. The marriage produced three children:

- Princess Joséphine Charlotte of Belgium, born at the Royal Palace of Brussels on 11 October 1927, Grand Duchess consort of Luxembourg. She was married on 9 April 1953 to Prince Jean, later Grand Duke of Luxembourg. She died at Fischbach Castle on 10 January 2005.
- Prince Baudouin of Belgium, Duke of Brabant, Count of Hainaut, who became the fifth King of the Belgians as Baudouin, born at Stuyvenberg on the outskirts of Brussels on 7 September 1930, and died at Motril in Andalusia, Spain, on 31 July 1993.
- Prince Albert of Belgium, Prince of Liège, who became the sixth King of the Belgians as Albert II, born at Stuyvenberg on 6 June 1934. He abdicated in July 2013.

On 29 August 1935, while the king and queen were driving along the winding, narrow roads near their villa at Küssnacht am Rigi, Schwyz, Switzerland, on the shores of Lake Lucerne, Leopold lost control of the convertible car which ran over the kerb and crashed straight into a tree. Astrid flew out of the open car and died at the scene of the accident.

Leopold married Lilian Baels on 11 September 1941, in a secret religious ceremony which was not valid under the law of Belgium. They originally intended to wait until the end of the war for the civil marriage, but as the new Princess of Réthy was soon expecting their first child, the ceremony took place on 6 December 1941. They had three children in total:

- Prince Alexandre of Belgium, born in Brussels on 18 July 1942. In 1991, he married Léa Wolman, a marriage revealed only seven years later. He died on 29 November 2009.
- Princess Marie-Christine of Belgium, born in Brussels on 6 February 1951. Her first marriage, to Paul Drucker in 1981, lasted 40 days (they were formally divorced in 1985). She later married Jean-Paul Gourges in 1989.
- Princess Marie-Esméralda of Belgium, later Lady Moncada, born in Brussels on 30 September 1956. She became a journalist; her professional name is Esmeralda de Réthy. She married pharmacologist Sir Salvador Moncada in 1998. They have a son and a daughter.

== World War II ==
When World War II broke out in September 1939, the French and British governments immediately sought to persuade Belgium to join them. Leopold and his government refused, maintaining Belgium's neutrality. Belgium considered itself well-prepared against a possible invasion by Axis forces, for during the 1930s the Belgian government had made extensive preparations to deter and repel an invasion of the country by Germany such as the one that had occurred in 1914.

On 10 May 1940, the Wehrmacht invaded Belgium. On the first day of the offensive, the principal Belgian strong point of Fort Eben-Emael was overwhelmed by a daring paratroop operation and the defensive perimeter thus penetrated before any French or British troops could arrive. After a short running battle that eventually involved the armies of all four belligerents, Belgium was overwhelmed by the numerically superior and better-prepared Germans.

Nevertheless, the Belgian perseverance prevented the British Expeditionary Force from being outflanked and cut off from the coast, enabling the evacuation from Dunkirk. Alan Brooke who commanded II Corps of the BEF thought that the 10th Belgian Division was in the wrong place and wanted to deploy north of Brussels to avoid "double-banking". He was advised by Roger Keyes to see the king, as the king was commanding the Belgian forces, and on 12 May was "making progress in getting matters put right" in discussion with the king in English, but was interrupted (twice) by the king's advisor who spoke to the king in French (in which Brooke was fluent). The advisor was insistent that the Belgian division could not be moved and the BEF should be stopped further south and clear of Brussels; Brooke said he was not putting the whole case to the king; he found that arguing with the advisor was a sheer waste of time as he cared little about the BEF and most of his suggestions were "fantastic". The king's advisor Raoul Van Overstraeten was not the Chief of Staff, as Brooke had assumed - Van Overstraeten had refused that rank - but the king's aide-de-camp, with the rank of Major-General, and would not give up the Louvain front. The French liaison officer, General Champon, told Brooke that Van Overstraeten had ascendancy over the king and had taken control, so it was useless to see the Chief of Staff. Later (15 May) Brooke found that the BEF was likely to "have both flanks turned" with French defeats, and started withdrawal on 16 May.

After his military surrender, Leopold (unlike Queen Wilhelmina of the Netherlands in a similar predicament) remained in Brussels to surrender to the victorious invaders, while his entire civil government fled to Paris and later to London.

=== Surrender and constitutional crisis ===
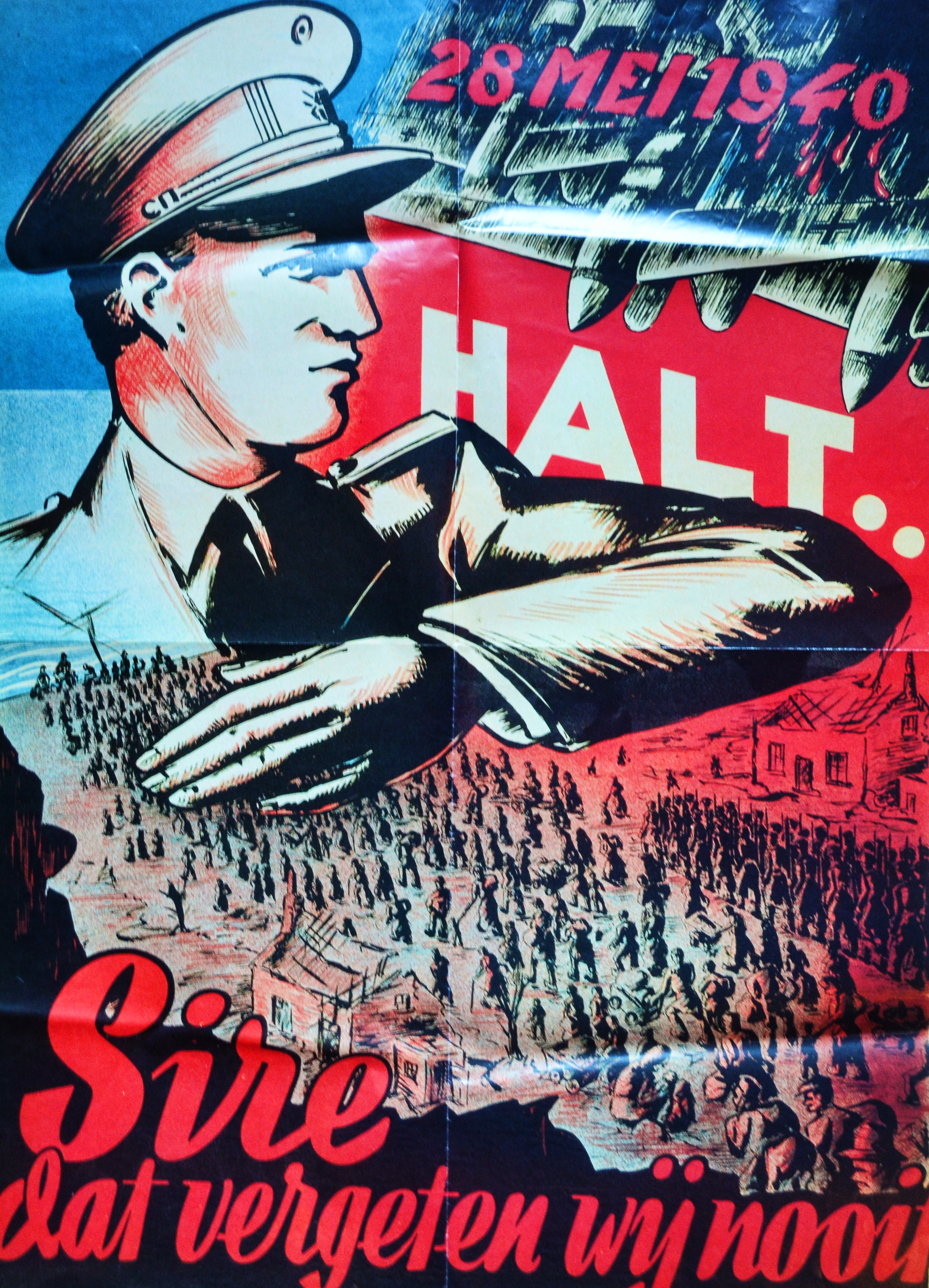
Belgian propaganda poster from King Leopold III with title "28 May 1940, Halt, Sire We will never forget this" in response to the Battle of Belgium

On 24 May 1940, Leopold, having assumed command of the Belgian Army, met with his ministers for the final time. The ministers urged the king to leave the country with the government. Prime Minister Hubert Pierlot reminded him that capitulation was a decision for the Belgian government, not for the king, to make. The king indicated that he had decided to remain in Belgium with his troops, whatever the outcome. The ministers took this to mean that he would establish a new government under the direction of Hitler, potentially a treasonous act. Leopold thought that he might be seen as a deserter if he were to leave the country: "He was resolved to remain with his army and amidst his people so as to share their fate." Leopold had long had a difficult and contentious relationship with his ministers, acting independently of government influence whenever possible, and seeking to circumvent and even limit the ministers' powers, while expanding his own.

French, British, and Belgian troops were encircled by German forces at the Battle of Dunkirk. Leopold notified King George VI by telegram on 25 May 1940 that Belgian forces were being crushed, saying "assistance which we give to the Allies will come to an end if our army is surrounded". Two days later (27 May 1940), Leopold surrendered the Belgian forces to the Germans.

Prime Minister Pierlot spoke on French radio, saying that the king's decision to surrender went against the Belgian Constitution. The decision, he said, was not only a military decision but also a political decision, and the king had acted without his ministers' advice, and therefore contrary to the Constitution. Pierlot and his government believed this created an impossibilité de régner:

Should the king find himself unable to reign, the ministers, having observed this inability, immediately summon the Chambers. Regency and guardianship are to be provided by the united Chambers.

It was impossible, however, to summon the Belgian Chamber of Representatives or Belgian Senate at this time, or to appoint a regent. After the liberation of Belgium in September 1944, the government asked Leopold's brother, Prince Charles, to serve as regent.

After Leopold's surrender, the British press denounced him as "Traitor King" and "King Rat"; the Daily Mirror published a picture of Leopold with the headline "The Face That Every Woman Now Despises". A group of Belgian refugees in Paris placed a message at King Albert's statue denouncing his son as "your unworthy successor". French Prime Minister Paul Reynaud accused Leopold of treason. Flemish historians Valaers and Van Goethem wrote that Leopold III had become "The scapegoat of Reynaud", because Reynaud was probably already aware that the Battle of France was lost.

Leopold's surrender was also decried by Winston Churchill. In the House of Commons on 4 June 1940 he said:

At the last moment when Belgium was already invaded, King Leopold called upon us to come to his aid, and even at the last moment we came. He and his brave, efficient army, nearly half a million strong, guarded our left flank and thus kept open our only line of retreat to the sea. Suddenly, without prior consultation, with the least possible notice, without the advice of his ministers and upon his own personal act, he sent a plenipotentiary to the German Command, surrendered his army and exposed our whole flank and means of retreat.

In 1949, Churchill's comments about the events of May 1940 were published in Le Soir (12 February 1949). Leopold's former secretary sent a letter to Churchill saying that Churchill was wrong. Churchill sent a copy of this letter to the King's brother, Prince Charles, via his secretary André de Staercke. In his own letter Churchill wrote,

With regards to King Leopold, the words which I used at the time in the House of Commons are upon record and after careful consideration I do not see any reason to change them (...) it seemed to me and many others that the king should have been guided by the advice of his ministers and should not have favoured a course which identified the capitulation of the Belgian Army with the submission of the Belgian State to Herr Hitler and consequently taking them out of the war. Happily this evil was averted, and in the end, all came right. I need scarcely say that nothing I said at the time could be interpreted as a reflection upon the personal courage or honour of King Leopold.

De Staercke replied that Churchill was right: "The Prince, Monsieur Spaak [Belgian Foreign Minister Paul-Henri Spaak] and I read your text, which states the precise truth and seems perfect to us."

Belgian historian Francis Balace wrote that capitulation was inevitable because the Belgian Army was not able to fight any longer against the German army. Even Churchill admitted that their position was perilous. In a telegram to Field Marshal Lord Gort on 27 May, only one day before the Belgian capitulation, he wrote, "We are asking them to sacrifice themselves for us."

=== After the fall of France ===
Upon Leopold's surrender, the government ministers left for exile, mostly in France. When France fell at the end of June 1940, several ministers sought to return to Belgium. They made an overture to Leopold but were rebuffed.

Because of the great popularity of the king, and the unpopularity of the civil government from the middle of 1940, the government crisis persisted.

On 2 August 1940, several ministers conferred in Le Perthus in France near the Spanish border. Prime Minister Pierlot and Foreign Minister Spaak were persuaded to go to London, but they were able to start out for London only at the end of August and could travel only via neutral Spain and Portugal. When they reached Spain, they were arrested and detained by the regime of Francisco Franco; they finally arrived in London on 22 October.

=== Meeting with Hitler ===
Leopold rejected cooperation with the government of Nazi Germany and refused to administer Belgium in accordance with its dictates; thus, the Germans implemented a military government. Leopold attempted to assert his authority as monarch and head of the Belgian government, although he was a prisoner of the Germans. Despite his defiance of the Germans, the Belgian government-in-exile in London maintained that the king did not represent the Belgian government and was unable to reign. The Germans held him at first under house arrest at the Royal Castle of Laeken. Having since June 1940 desired a meeting with Adolf Hitler in respect of the situation of Belgian prisoners of war, Leopold III finally met with him on 19 November 1940. Leopold wanted to persuade Hitler to release Belgian POWs, and issue a public statement about Belgium's future independence. Hitler refused to speak about the independence of Belgium or issue a statement about it. In refusing to publish a statement, Hitler preserved the king from being seen as cooperating with Germany, and thus engaged in treasonous acts, which would likely have obliged him to abdicate upon the liberation of Belgium. "The [German] Chancellor saved the king two times."

=== Second marriage ===
On 11 September 1941, while a prisoner of the Germans, Leopold secretly married Lilian Baels in a religious ceremony that had no validity under Belgian law, which required a religious marriage to be preceded by a legal or civil marriage. On 6 December, they were married under civil law. The reason for the out-of-order marriages was never officially made public.

Jozef-Ernest Cardinal van Roey, Archbishop of Mechelen, wrote an open letter to parish priests throughout the country announcing Leopold's second marriage on 7 December. The letter from the Cardinal revealed that the king's new wife would be known as Princesse de Réthy, not Queen Lilian, and that any children they had would have no claim to the throne. Leopold's new marriage damaged his reputation further in the eyes of many of his subjects.

=== The Political Testament ===
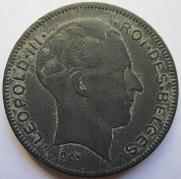
The face of Leopold III on the zinc 5 franc coin.

The ministers made several efforts during the war to work out a suitable agreement with Leopold III. They sent Pierlot's son-in-law as an emissary to Leopold in January 1944, carrying a letter offering reconciliation from the Belgian government-in-exile. The letter never reached its destination, however, as the son-in-law was killed by the Germans en route. The ministers did not know what happened either to the message or the messenger and assumed that Leopold was ignoring them.

Leopold wrote his Political Testament in January 1944, shortly after this failed attempt at reconciliation. The testament was to be published in case he was not in Belgium when Allied forces arrived. The testament, which had an imperious and negative tone, considered the potential Allied movement into Belgium an "occupation", not a "liberation". It gave no credit to the active Belgian resistance. The Belgian government-in-exile in London did not like Leopold's demand that the government ministers involved in the 1940 crisis be dismissed. The Allies did not like Leopold's repudiation of the treaties concluded by the Belgian government-in-exile in London. The United States was particularly concerned about the economic treaty it had reached with the government-in-exile that enabled it to obtain Congolese uranium for America's secret atom bomb program, which had been developed for use against Germany (although, as it turned out, Germany surrendered before the first bomb was ready).

The Belgian government did not publish the Political Testament and tried to ignore it, partly for fear of increased support for the Belgian Communist Party. When Pierlot and Spaak learned of its contents in September 1944, they were astonished and felt deceived by the king. According to André de Staercke, they were dismayed "in the face of so much blindness and unawareness".

Churchill's reaction to the Testament was simply, "It stinks." In a sentence inspired by a quote of Talleyrand about the Bourbons after the restoration of the French monarchy in 1815, Churchill declared, "He is like the Bourbons, he has learned nothing and forgotten nothing."

== Exile and abdication ==
=== Deportation and exile ===
On 7 June 1944, Heinrich Himmler ordered Leopold deported to Germany. Princess Lilian followed with the family in another car the following day under an SS armed guard. The Nazis interned the family in a fort at Hirschstein in Saxony from June 1944 to March 1945, and then at Strobl, Austria.

The British and American governments worried about the return of the king. Charles W. Sawyer, US Ambassador to Belgium, warned his government that an immediate return by the king to Belgium would "precipitate serious difficulties". "There are deep differences even in the royal family and the situation holds dynamite for Belgium and perhaps for Europe". "The Foreign Office feared that an increasing minority in French-speaking Wallonia would demand either autonomy or annexation to France. Winant, the American Ambassador to the Court of St James's, reported a Foreign Office official's concern regarding irredentist propaganda in Wallonia." and that "the French Ambassador in Brussels... is believed to have connived in the spreading of this propaganda".

Leopold and his companions were released by members of the United States 106th Cavalry Group in early May 1945. Because of the controversy about his conduct during the war, Leopold III and his wife and children were unable to return to Belgium and spent the next six years in exile at Pregny-Chambésy near Geneva, Switzerland. A regency under his brother Prince Charles had been established by the Belgian legislature in 1944.

=== Resistance to Leopold's return ===
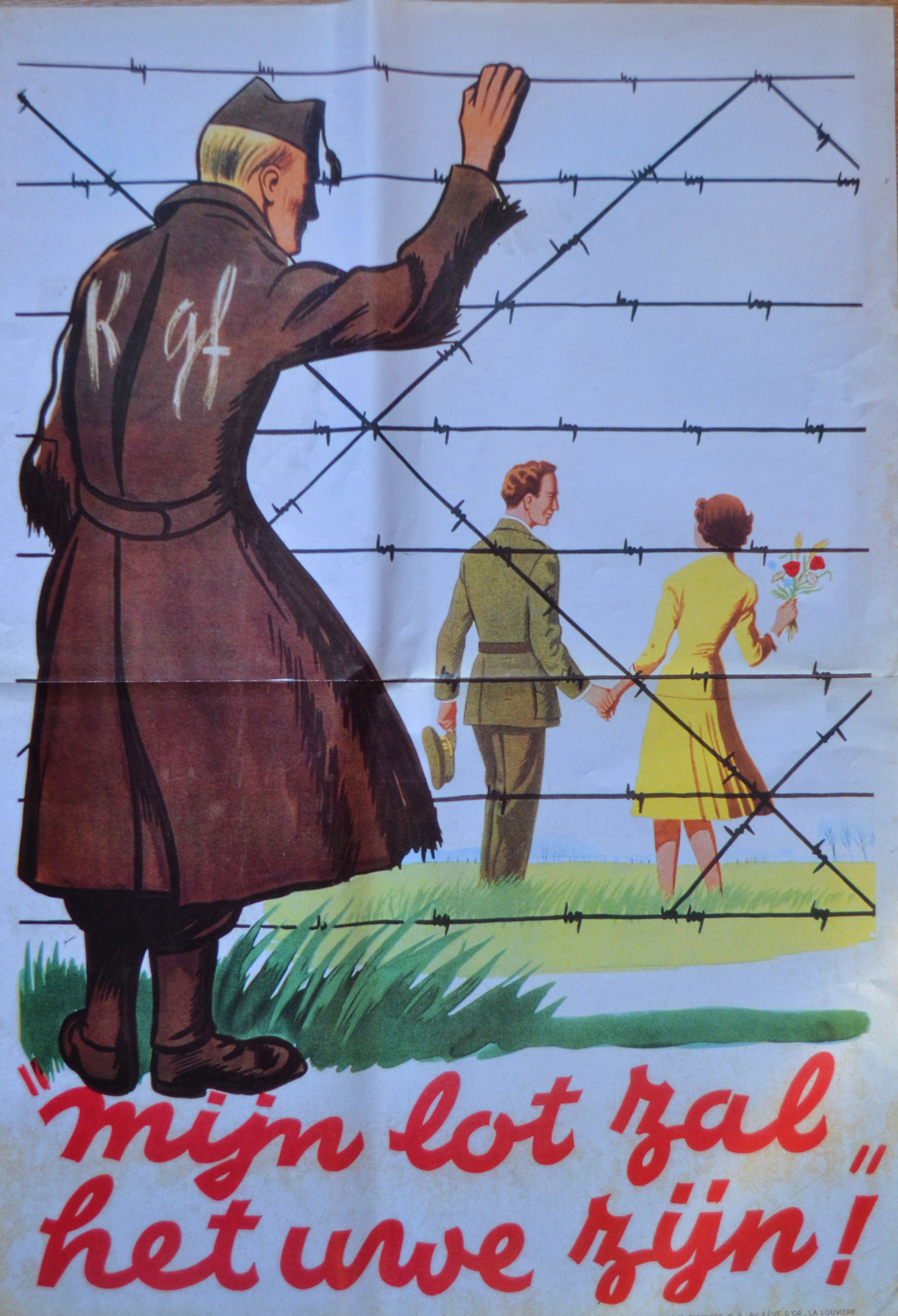
Belgian propaganda poster about King Leopold III with the title "My Destiny will be yours". The "Kgf" on the coat stands for Kriegsgefangener, German for "prisoner of war". Published in 1950 in response to the royal question.

Frans Henri van den Dungen, rector of the Free University of Brussels, wrote to Leopold on 25 June 1945 about concerns for serious disorder in Wallonia, "The question is not if the accusations against you are right or not [but that...] you are no longer a symbol of Belgian unity."

Robert Gillon, the President of the Belgian Senate, told the king that there was a threat of serious disorder: "If there are only ten or twenty people killed, the situation would become terrible for the king."

The president of the Belgian Chamber of Representatives, Frans Van Cauwelaert, was concerned that there would be a general strike in Wallonia and revolt in Liège. He wrote, "The country is not able to put down the disorders because of the insufficient forces of the police and a lack of weapons."

In 1946, a commission of inquiry exonerated Leopold of treason. Nonetheless, controversy concerning his loyalty continued, and in 1950, a referendum was held about his future. Fifty-seven per cent of the voters favoured his return. The divide between Leopoldists and anti-Leopoldists ran along the lines of socialists and Walloons who were mostly opposed (42% favourable votes in Wallonia) and Christian Democrats and Flemish who were more in favour of the king (70% favourable votes in Flanders).

== General strike of 1950 ==
On 31 July 1950, after the fusillade of Grâce-Berleur, Liège and other municipalities of Wallonia replaced the Belgian flag with the Walloon flag

His return to Belgium on 22 July 1950 was met with one of the most violent general strikes in the history of Belgium. Three protesters were killed when the gendarmerie opened fire with automatic weapons. The country stood on the brink of civil war, and Belgian banners were replaced by Walloon flags in Liège and other municipalities of Wallonia. To avoid tearing the country apart, and to preserve the monarchy, Leopold decided on 1 August 1950 to delegate his powers and duties to his 20-year-old son Baudouin, making the latter regent. At the urging of the government, Leopold abdicated on 16 July 1951 in favour of Baudouin. If he had remained king until the day of his death, he would have ruled for 49 years, surpassing Leopold II as longest-reigning monarch of Belgium.

== Post-abdication life ==
Leopold and his wife continued to advise King Baudouin until the latter's marriage in 1960. Some Belgian historians, such as Vincent Delcorps, speak of there having been a "diarchy" during this period.

In retirement, he followed his passion as an amateur social anthropologist and entomologist and travelled the world, collecting zoological specimens. Two species of reptiles are named after him, Gehyra leopoldi and Polemon leopoldi.

Leopold died in 1983 in Woluwe-Saint-Lambert (Sint-Lambrechts-Woluwe) following emergency heart surgery. He was interred next to Queen Astrid in the royal vault at the Church of Our Lady of Laeken. Leopold's second wife, the Princess de Réthy, was later interred with them.

== See also ==
- Crown Council of Belgium
- Kings of Belgium family tree
- Royal Trust
- List of covers of Time magazine: 1930s, 1940s

== Notes ==
Leopold III of Belgium House of Saxe-Coburg and Gotha Cadet branch of the House of Wettin Born: 3 November 1901 Died: 25 September 1983
Regnal titles
Preceded by Albert I	King of the Belgians; 1934–1951	Succeeded by Baudouin
Belgian royalty
Vacant Title last held by Leopold	Duke of Brabant; 1909–1934	Succeeded by Baudouin
