= Prince Alexandre of Belgium =

Belgian prince (1942–2009)

Prince Alexandre
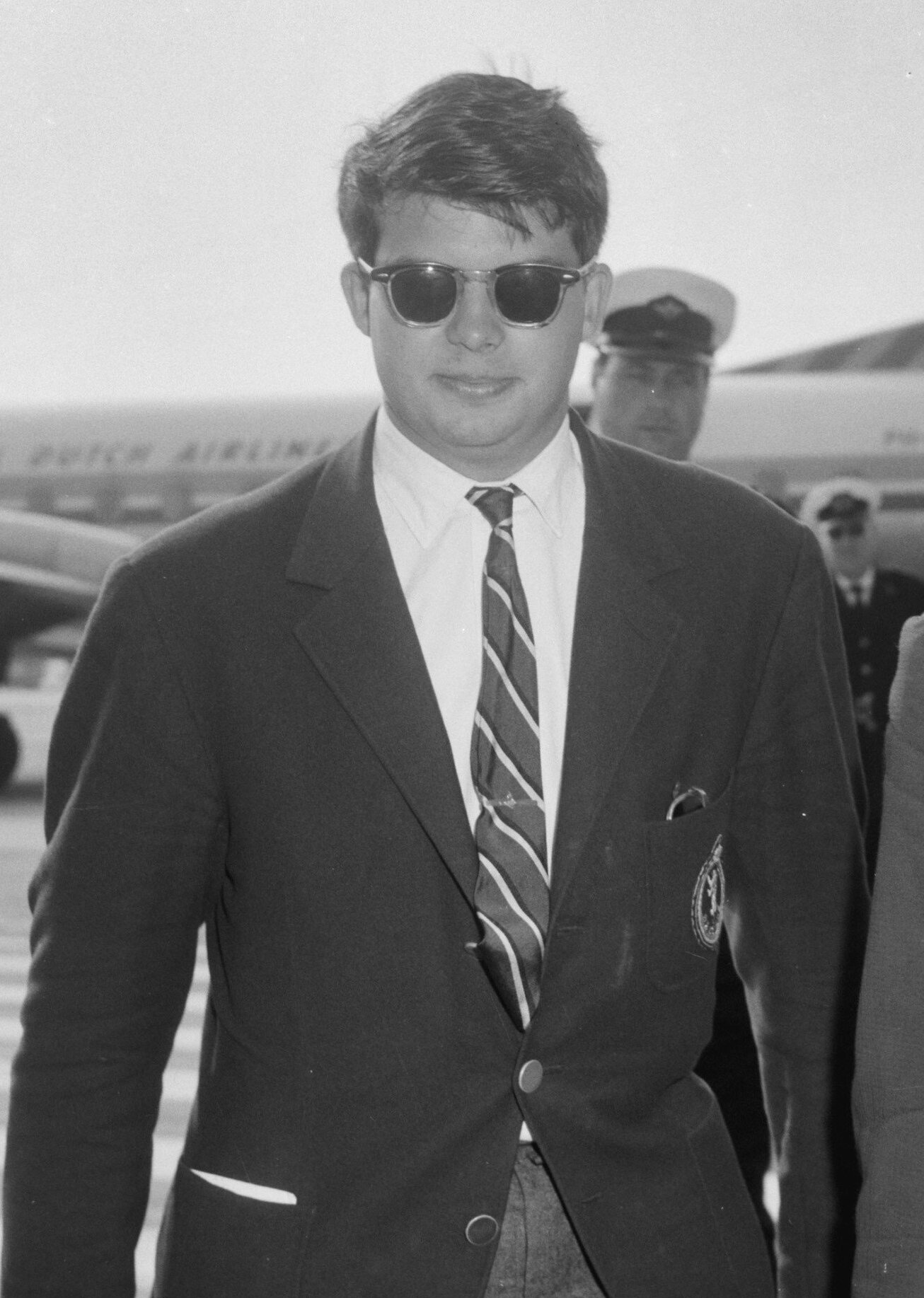
- Prince Alexandre of Belgium in August 1963
- Born: 18 July 1942; Royal Castle of Laeken, Laeken, Brussels, Belgium
- Died: 29 November 2009 (aged 67); Sint-Genesius-Rode, Belgium
- Burial: Church of Our Lady of Laeken
- Spouse: Léa Wolman (m. 1991)
Names
- French: Alexandre Emmanuel Henry Albert Marie Léopold; Dutch: Alexander Emanuel Hendrik Albert Maria Leopold
- House: Belgium
- Father: Leopold III of Belgium
- Mother: Lilian Baels

Prince Alexandre of Belgium (French: Alexandre Emmanuel Henry Albert Marie Léopold, Dutch: Alexander Emanuel Hendrik Albert Maria Leopold; 18 July 1942 – 29 November 2009) was the fourth child of King Leopold III of Belgium, and the eldest for his second wife Lilian, Princess of Réthy. King Baudouin and King Albert II of Belgium were his older half-brothers. Grand Duchess Joséphine-Charlotte of Luxembourg was his older half-sister.

== Background and youth ==
Prince Alexandre was born at the Royal Castle of Laeken in Brussels on 18 July 1942.. He had two younger full sisters: Marie-Christine and Marie-Esméralda. His godmother was his elder half-sister, Princess Joséphine-Charlotte of Belgium.

Held under house arrest by the Germans until 1944, upon the invasion in Normandy, Léopold, his second wife, and his four children were transferred to Germany and Austria where they remained under house arrest, first in a fort at Hirschstein in Saxony during the winter of 1944–45, and then at Strobl, near Salzburg. They were freed by the U.S. Army in May 1945. After the war, the Royal Family was unable to return to Belgium and was forced to spend some years in Swiss exile before finally being able to return to Belgium in 1950 after a national referendum. Alexandre studied medicine for a while, later pursuing a career in trade. Suffering from serious heart problems, he was successfully operated upon in the USA. This decision raised criticism in Belgium by some who suggested that his surgery should have been performed in his own country.

Unverified sources have claimed that, in September 1971, Prince Alexandre was responsible for a car accident that resulted in the death of a Belgian priest named l'abbé Froidure. The priest had survived concentration camps in WW2, organized a charitable organization still present in Brussels (Les Petits Riens/Spullenhulp), knew the royal family including King Baudouin, and died in a crash in front of his home. It has been suggested that the Belgian royal family controlled the official inquiry and avoided any further investigation or consequences.

== Marriage ==
In Debenham, Suffolk, on 14 March 1991 Alexandre married Léa Wolman, who had been twice divorced. The marriage was kept secret until 1998 because the Prince apparently feared his mother would disapprove. The couple remained childless. The initial secrecy surrounding this marriage has parallels with his father's wedding to his mother fifty years previously, in 1941.

== Royal status ==
There had been some friction between the children of the first marriage of King Leopold III of Belgium and those of his second marriage. Eventually, however, Alexandre and the dynastic descendants of the first marriage seemed to have made their peace, and the prince and his wife joined the rest of the Royal Family in public appearances. This does not appear to extend to the two younger children of the second marriage, Princess Marie-Christine of Belgium and Princess Marie-Esméralda of Belgium.

Although it has been assumed that the children of King Léopold's second marriage were barred from the Belgian throne, some constitutional scholars maintain that there was no legal ground for Alexandre's exclusion. Even if that is the case, Alexandre's secret marriage in 1991 contravened Article 85 of the Belgian constitution, which deprived of the right of succession to the Throne any descendant of King Leopold I who marries without the Sovereign's permission.

Nonetheless, in a May 2008 interview with Point de vue a little over a year before Alexandre's death, his wife noted, "...the children of the second marriage of King Leopold -- Prince Alexandre, the Princesses Maria Esmeralda and Marie-Christine -- have been raised in a certain manner: Prince and Princesses of Belgium, accorded the style of Royal Highness, yet excluded from the succession to the throne." She added, "Alexandre received a very solid intellectual education...He waited to assume some official responsibilities. They never came."

== Death ==
Alexandre died on 29 November 2009 of a pulmonary embolism. His funeral was held on 4 December 2009 at the Church of Our Lady of Laeken. He was buried in the crypt.
