= List of state visits made and received by Albert II of Belgium =

The list of King Albert II and Queen Paola of Belgium's state visits are:

== State visits abroad by King Albert II and Queen Paola ==
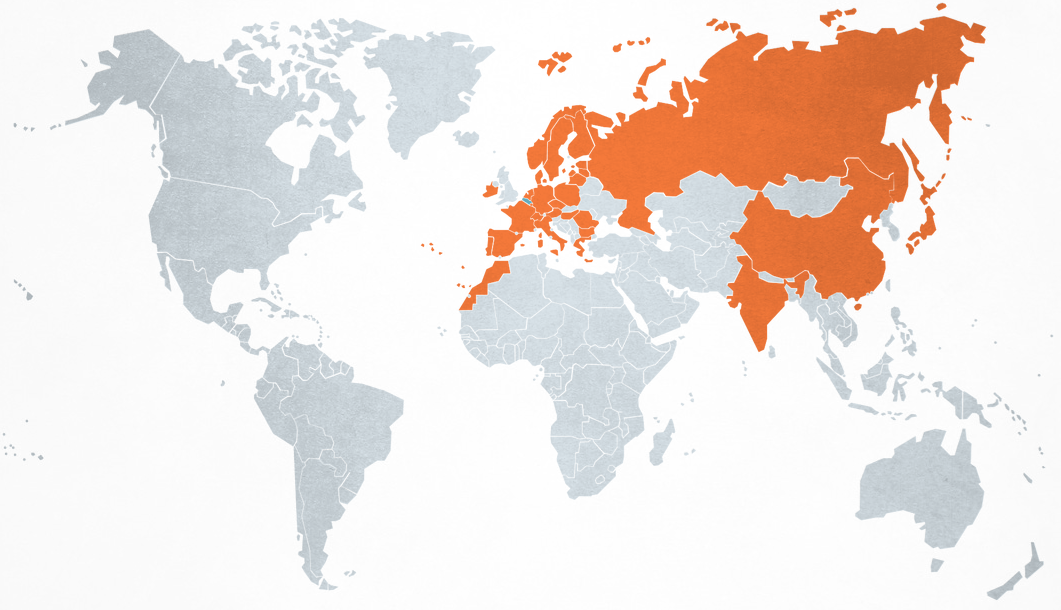
Map of countries visited by Albert II and Queen Paola

=== 1990s ===
Date(s)	Country	Details
17–20 March 1994	Luxembourg	hosted by Grand Duke Jean and Grand Duchess Josephine-Charlotte, his sister
03–5 May 1994	Sweden	by King Carl XVI Gustaf, Queen Silvia
19–22 September 1994	Spain	hosted by King Juan Carlos and Queen Sofía of Spain
16–18 May 1995	Denmark	hosted by Queen Margrethe II and Henrik, Prince Consort of Denmark
10–12 July 1995	Germany	hosted by President Roman Herzog and Christiane Herzog
05–7 June 1996	Finland	hosted by President Martti Ahtisaari and Eeva Ahtisaari
21–25 October 1996	Japan	(with Prince Philippe), hosted by Emperor Akihito and Empress Michiko
28–30 April 1997	Norway	hosted by King Harald V and Queen Sonja of Norway
06–8 October 1997	Austria	visiting President Thomas Klestil
19–21 February 1998	Russia	Prince Philippe arrived on 18/02 for own program.
12–15 May 1998	Italy	visiting President Oscar Luigi Scalfaro
10–12 May 1999	Poland	visiting President Aleksander Kwaśniewski and Jolanta Kwaśniewska
23–25 November 1999	Portugal	visiting President Jorge Sampaio and Maria José Ritta

=== 2000s ===
Date(s)	Country	Details
04–6 April 2000	Netherlands	visiting Queen Beatrix and Prince Claus of the Netherlands
24–26 October 2000	Czech Republic	visiting President Václav Havel and Dagmar Havlová
21–22 November 2000	Switzerland	visiting President Adolf Ogi
19–21 June 2001	Greece	visiting President Konstantinos Stephanopoulos
24–26 June 2002	Hungary	visiting President Ferenc Mádl and Dalma Mádl
14–16 October 2003	Bulgaria	visiting President Georgi Parvanov and Zorka Parvanova
27–29 October 2003	France	visiting President Jacques Chirac and Bernadette Chirac
05–7 October 2004	Morocco	visiting King Muhammad VI and Princess Lalla Salma of Morocco
04–11 June 2005	China	visiting President Hu Jintao and Liu Yongqing
20–22 March 2006	Lithuania	visiting President Valdas Adamkus and Alma Adamkienė
23–25 April 2007	Latvia	visiting Madame President Vaira Vīķe-Freiberga and Imants Freibergs
08–10 October 2007	Ireland	visiting President Mary McAleese and Martin McAleese
10–12 June 2008	Estonia	visiting President Toomas Hendrik Ilves and Evelin Ilves
02–12 November 2008	India	visiting Madame President Pratibha Devisingh Patil
07–9 July 2009	Romania	visiting President Traian Băsescu and Maria Băsescu

=== 2010s ===
Date(s)	Country	Details
29–30 March 2011	Germany	hosted by President Horst Köhler and Eva Bohnet

== State visits received by King Albert II and Queen Paola in Belgium ==
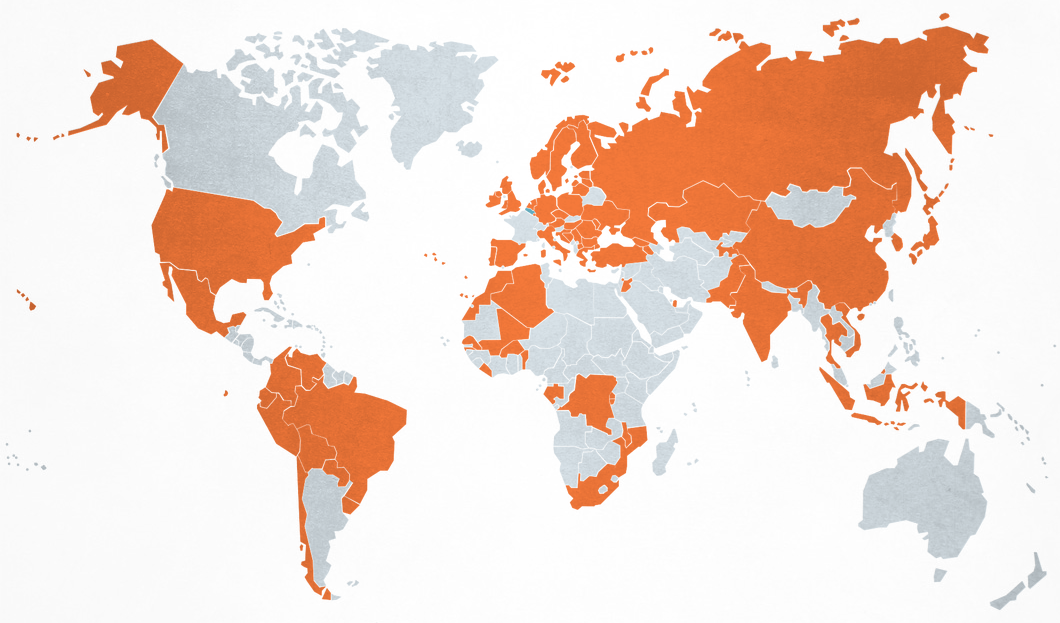
State visits received by King Albert II and Queen Paola in Belgium

=== 1990s ===
Date(s)	Country	Details
09–12 September 1993	Japan	visited by Emperor Akihito and Empress Michiko
13–15 July 1998	Germany	visited by President Roman Herzog and Christiane Herzog
16–18 March 1999	Luxembourg	visited by Grand Duke Jean and Grand Duchess Josephine-Charlotte, his sister

=== 2000s ===
Date(s)	Guest	Title	Country	Details
08-11/4/2001	Sweden	King and Queen	Carl XVI Gustaf Silvia of Sweden and Victoria, Crown Princess of Sweden	
16–18/5/2000	Spain	King and Queen	Juan Carlos and Sofía of Spain	first state visit with new Princess Mathilde of Belgium attending
01/10/2001	Poland	President	Aleksander Kwaśniewski	
02/10/2001	Russia	President	Vladimir Putin	audience followed by a lunch
10/10/2001	Africa	African Heads of State	gathered in Brussels in the frame of the "New African Initiative"	
15/10/2001	Venezuela	President	Hugo Chávez	
29/11/2001	Republic of Macedonia	President	Boris Trajkovski	
04/12/2001	Burundi	President	Pierre Buyoya	
19/12/2001	Algeria	President	Abdelaziz Bouteflika	
05/02/2002	Bulgaria	President	Georgi Parvanov	
19/03/2002	Georgia	President	Eduard Shevardnadze	
28–30 /5/2002	Denmark	Queen	Margrethe II and Henrik, Prince Consort of Denmark	
11/06/2002	Jordan	King and Queen	King Abdullah II and Queen Rania	
03/10/2002	Bulgaria	President	Georgi Parvanov	Audience by the King and Queen, followed by a lunch attended by King and Queen, Queen Fabiola, Prince Philippe and Princess Mathilde, Princess Astrid and Prince Lorenz, and Prince Laurent.
15–17/10/2002	Italy	President	Carlo Azeglio Ciampi and Franca Ciampi (& Audience 10/2003)	
19/11/2002	Senegal	President	Abdoulaye Wade	
04/12/2002	Macedonia	President	Boris Trajkovski	
05/12/2002	Peru	President	Alejandro Toledo	
10/12/2002	Algeria	President	Abdelaziz Bouteflika	audience followed by a lunch
11/02/2003	Croatia	President	Stjepan Mesić	
22/02/2003	Burundi	President	Pierre Buyoya	
25/03/2003	Tajikistan	President	Emomalii Rahmon	
19/05/2003	World Bank	President	James Wolfensohn	lunch with Prince Philippe.
20–22/2003	Norway	King and Queen	Harald V and Sonja of Norway	first state visit with new Princess Claire of Belgium attending
24/06/2003	Moldova	President	Vladimir Voronin	
08/07/2003	Burundi	President	Domitien Ndayizeye	
08/09/2003	Benin	President	Mathieu Kérékou	
01/10/2003	Italy	President	Carlo Azeglio Ciampi	Audience and lunch
20/11/2003	Ireland	President	Mary McAleese	
04/12/2003	Armenia	President	Robert Kocharyan	
15/01/2004	Burundi	President	Domitien Ndayizeye	
09/02/2004	Colombia	President	Álvaro Uribe	
10/02/2004	Democratic Republic of the Congo	President	Joseph Kabila	
12/02/2004	Bulgaria	President	Georgi Parvanov	
11/03/2004	Rwanda	President	Paul Kagame	
30/3/-1/4/2004	Finland	President	Tarja Halonen and Pentti Arajärvi	
12/10/2004	Tajikistan	President	Emomalii Rahmon	
26–28/10/2004	Poland	President	Aleksander Kwaśniewski and Jolanta Kwasniewska	
16/11/2004	South Africa	President	Thabo Mbeki	
25/11/2004	Jordan	King	Abdullah II	lunch
16/12/2004	Lithuania	President	Valdas Adamkus	
18/01/2005	Germany	President	Horst Köhler	
1–3/2/2005	Greece	President	Constantinos Stephanopoulos	
21/02/2005	United States of America	President	George W. Bush	
22/02/2005	Burkina Faso	President	Blaise Compaoré	
02/03/2005	Palestinian National Authority	President	Mahmoud Abbas	
08/03/2005	Malawi	President	Bingu wa Mutharika	
16/06/2005	Romania	President	Traian Băsescu	
20/06/2005	Gabon	President	Omar Bongo	
12/10/2005	Peru	President	Alejandro Toledo	
18–20/10/2005	Portugal	President	Jorge Sampaio and Maria José Ritta	
16/11/2005	Mali	President	Amadou Toumani Touré	presence of Prince Philippe and Princess Mathilde
07/12/2005	Burundi	President	Pierre Nkurunziza	
06/03/2006	Bosnia and Herzegovina	President	Sulejman Tihić	
09/03/2006	Serbia and Montenegro	President	Svetozar Marović	
15/05/2006	Paraguay	President	Nicanor Duarte	
16/05/2006	Bolivia	President	Evo Morales	
20–22/6/2006	Netherlands	Queen	Beatrix of the Netherlands	
19/07/2006	Mozambique	President	Armando Guebuza	
02/10/2006	Latvia	President	Vaira Vīķe-Freiberga	
17/10/2006	Benin	President	Yayi Boni	
16/11/2006	Qatar	Emir	Hamad bin Khalifa Al Thani	Lunch in presence of the Queen, Prince Philippe and Princess Mathilde.
05/12/2006	Kazakhstan	President	Nursultan Nazarbayev	
20/12/2006	Estonia	President	Toomas Hendrik Ilves	
15/03/2007	Liberia	President	Ellen Johnson Sirleaf	
19/03/2007	Ireland	President	Mary McAleese	
20–22 /3/2007	Luxembourg	Grand Duke and Duchess	Henri, Grand Duke and Maria Teresa, Grand Duchess of Luxembourg	
05/06/2007	Mexico	President	Felipe Calderón	
24/09/2007	Democratic Republic of the Congo	President	Joseph Kabila	
03/10/2007	Bulgaria	President	Georgi Parvanov	
03/10/2007	Romania	President	Traian Băsescu	
15–17 /4/2008	Hungary	President	László Sólyom	
26/03/2009	Turkey	President	Abdullah Gül	
14/05/2009	Macedonia	President	Gjorge Ivanov	
17/06/2009	Pakistan	President	Asif Ali Zardari	
18/06/2009	Jordan	King	Abdullah II	
04/10/2009	Brazil	President	Luiz Inácio Lula da Silva	
14/10/2009	Ukraine	President	Victor Yushchenko	
21/10/2009	Burundi	President	Pierre Nkurunziza	
29/10/2009	Lithuania	President	Dalia Grybauskaite	
26/11/2009	Ecuador	President	Rafael Correa	
01/09/2010	Poland	President	Bronisław Komorowski	
29/09/2010	South Africa	President	Jacob Zuma	
05/10/2010	South Korea	President	Lee Myung-bak	
05/10/2010	Brunei	Sultan	Hassanal Bolkiah	
06/10/2010	China	Prime Minister	Wen Jiabao	
08/12/2010	Russia	President	Dmitry Medvedev	
15/12/2010	Jordan	King	Abdullah II	
25/01/2011	Hungary	President	Pál Schmitt	
25/05/2011	Czech Republic	President	Václav Klaus	
19/10/2011	Uruguay	President	José Mujica	
13/11/2012	Poland	President	Bronisław Komorowski	
14/11/2012	Chile	President	Sebastián Piñera	

== Sources ==
- Royal family's website, State visits in Belgium (French)
- Royal family's website, State visits abroad (French)
- Royal family's website, Audiences (French)
