= Henri Baels =

Belgian Catholic Party politician and ship-owner

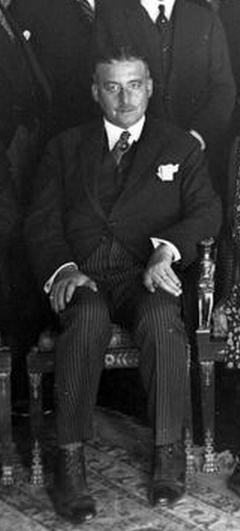
- Born: Henri Louis Baels; 18 January 1878; Ostend, Belgium
- Died: 14 June 1951 (aged 73); Knokke, Belgium
- Occupations: Shipowner, politician
- Spouse: Anne Marie de Visscher (m. 1905; died 1950)
- Children: Elza Baels; Lydia Baels; Susanne Baels; Walter Baels; Hermann Baels; Henry Baels; Lilian Baels; Edwige Baels; Ludwina Baels
- Parents: Julius Ludovicus Baels (father); Delphina Alexandrina Mauricx (mother)

Henri Louis Baels (18 January 1878 – 14 June 1951), was a Belgian Catholic Party politician, and ship-owner from Ostend.

== Early life ==
Baels was born on 18 January 1878 in Ostend, Belgium. He was the son of Julius Ludovicus Baels (1851–1896), a shipowner, and Delphina Alexandrina Mauricx (1848–1931), who married in Ostend in January 1876.

== Career ==
He eventually became Minister of Agriculture, then Minister of the Interior, and, finally, Minister of Public Works and Public Health. He crowned his career by becoming Governor of West Flanders in 1936. A friend of King Albert I of the Belgians, and later equally trusted by Albert's son, King Leopold III of the Belgians, Henri Baels was responsible, among other important public initiatives, for the creation of the Albert Canal.

Baels was also a great friend of Dom Marie-Albert van der Cruyssen, the Abbot of the Cistercian Monastery of Orval, Belgium, and took a lead in supporting the restoration of the Monastery, a project the Abbot (who was also a highly decorated Belgian war hero of World War I) had undertaken.

== Personal life ==
Baels was married to Anne Marie de Visscher (1882–1950), member of a minor Belgian nobility, a daughter of Adolphus Gustavus de Visscher and his wife, Alicia Victoria Carolina Opsomer. She was a descendant of Count Felix de Muelenaere, member of the Belgian National Congress (when founding the Kingdom of Belgium in 1831), who was a three-time Minister of Foreign Affairs between 1831 and 1841. Together, Anne Marie and Henri were the parents of eight children, including:

- Mary Lilian Baels (1916–2002), who became the second wife of King Leopold III of Belgium.
- Lydia Baels (1920–1990), who married Jean-Jacques Cartier, a son of jeweler Jacques-Théodule Cartier and the former Nelly Harjes.

Their other children included Elza Baels, Susanne Baels, Ludwina Baels, Walter Baels, Hermann Baels (who married), and Henry Baels. Baels died on 14 June 1951 in Knokke, Belgium.

=== Descendants ===
Through his daughter Lydia, he was a grandfather of two Viviane Mary Cartier (b. Dorking, 22 December 1946) and N. N. Cartier (b. Dorking, 26 April 1948).
