= Princess Marie-Esméralda of Belgium =

Member of the Belgian royal family

Princess Marie-Esméralda
- Lady Moncada
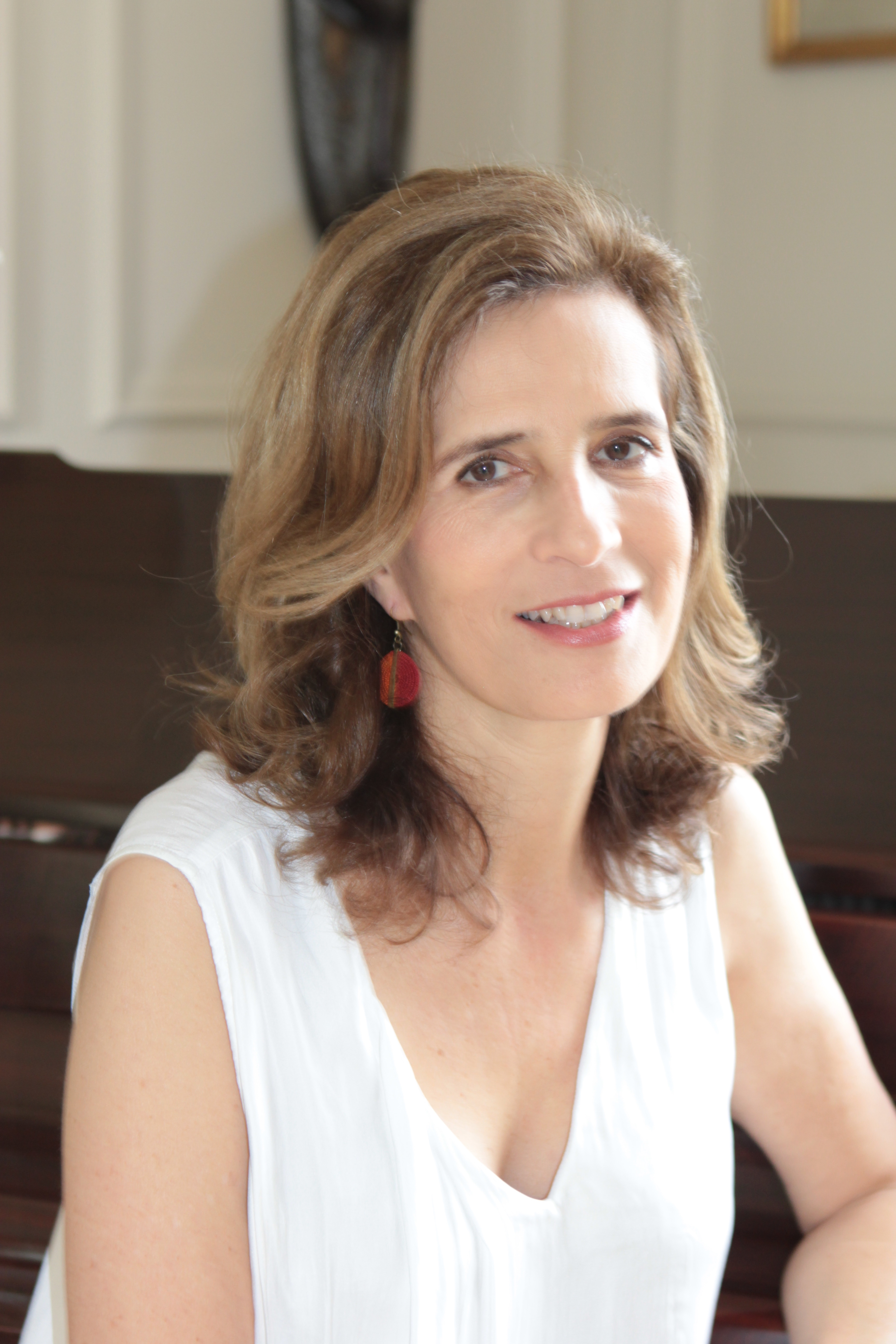
- Marie-Esméralda in 2015
- Born: 30 September 1956 (age 70); Royal Castle of Laeken, Brussels, Belgium
- Spouse: Sir Salvador Moncada (m. 1998)
- Issue: Alexandra Moncada; Leopoldo Moncada
Names
- French: Maria-Esmeralda Adélaïde Lilian Anne Léopoldine; Dutch: Maria-Esmeralda Adelaïde Lilian Anne Léopoldine; German: Maria-Esmeralda Adelheid Liliane Anna Leopoldine
- House: Belgium
- Father: Leopold III of Belgium
- Mother: Mary Lilian Baels

Princess Marie-Esméralda of Belgium, Lady Moncada (born 30 September 1956), is a member of the Belgian royal family. She is the half-aunt of King Philippe of Belgium and Henri, Grand Duke of Luxembourg. Princess Marie-Esméralda is a journalist, author, documentary-maker, environmental activist and a campaigner for the rights of women and indigenous people.

== Family ==
Princess Marie-Esméralda is the youngest child of the late Leopold III of Belgium and his second wife, Lilian Baels, Princess of Réthy. Her full siblings are the late Prince Alexandre of Belgium and Princess Marie-Christine of Belgium. Her half-siblings include the late King Baudouin of Belgium, former King Albert II of Belgium (who is also Marie-Esméralda's godfather), and the late Grand Duchess Joséphine-Charlotte of Luxembourg from her father's marriage to his first wife, Queen Astrid.

Princess Marie-Esméralda of Belgium married Sir Salvador Moncada, a Honduran-British pharmacologist, in London on 5 April 1998. They have a daughter, Alexandra Léopoldine Moncada (born in London on 4 August 1998), and a son, Leopoldo Daniel Moncada (born in London on 21 May 2001).

== Career ==
Princess Marie-Esméralda is a journalist and author, writing under the name Esmeralda de Réthy. After studying law at the Université Saint-Louis - Bruxelles, she graduated in journalism at Université catholique de Louvain in Louvain-la-Neuve and then moved to Paris to pursue her career, working freelance for international magazines. Her book Christian Dior, the Early Years 1947-1957 focused on the career of Christian Dior and was published in 2001 by Vendome Press. Esmeralda then went on to write several books about her late father King Leopold III using archival material such as letters and photos. Her book Léopold III, mon père was published in 2001, followed in 2006 by Leopold III photographe, both published by Racine. In these books she writes about her father's expeditions, and his passion for nature, science and photography, rather than the Belgian royal family (Racine). One year later, her mother Lilian was the subject of "Lilian, une princesse entre ombres et lumière", which she co-wrote with Patrick Weber (Racine). In 2014, she wrote about her grandparents "Albert and Elisabeth" with Christophe Vachaudez (Racine). In the same year, Esméralda published a book about female Nobel Peace Prize winners called "Femmes prix Nobel de la Paix" (Avant-Propos).

=== Documentaries ===
She has produced three documentary films directed by Nicolas Delvaulx and broadcast by the Belgian channel RTBF "Leopold III, my father", "In the footsteps of King Albert and Queen Elizabeth, my grandparents" (2014), and "Virunga" (2016).

== Activism ==
=== Environmental issues ===
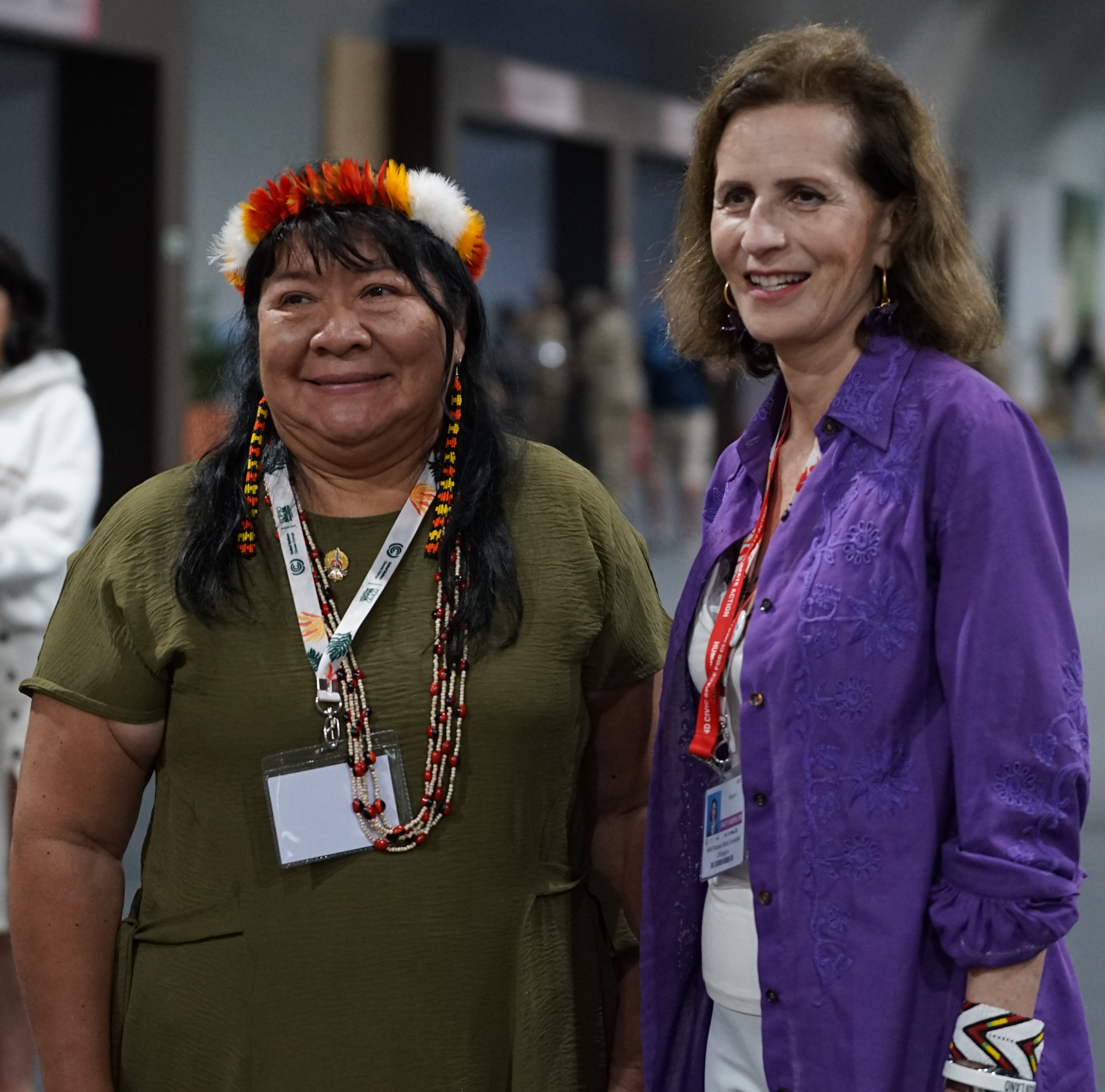
Joenia Wapichana and Princess Marie-Esméralda at COP30 (2025)

Princess Marie-Esméralda dedicates time to environmental issues. She has given many talks and written many articles as well as a book called "Terre, agissons pour la planete, il n’est pas trop tard" (Earth – Act Now to Save our Planet. It's not too Late) which discussed the importance of protecting the environment. She has taken part in high-profile campaigns such as the Antarctica Greenpeace one in 2015. In her documentary "Virunga" with Nicolas Delvaulx in 2016, she highlights the significance of the park because of its exceptional diversity and sustainable development. Marie-Esméralda has been the president of the King Leopold III Fund for Nature Exploration and Conservation since the death of her father in 1983. In October 2026, she became honorary president of Take Action Global Belgium, the Belgian branch of the international climate education organisation Take Action Global.

Princess Marie-Esméralda was arrested in London, England on 10 October 2019 after joining an Extinction Rebellion (XR) sit-in protest at Trafalgar Square, but later released without charge. She had been demonstrating all week, and had demonstrated with XR that April. She said, "The more people from all sections of society protest, the greater the impact will be".

=== Women's rights ===
Marie-Esméralda takes part in many women's rights' conferences. In December 2013, she participated in a feminist play in Brussels called "Blessées à mort" ("Wounded to Death") written by Italian author Serena Dandini. She read a monologue on stage called "Fleur de Lotus" (Lotus Flower). In March 2015, alongside Eve Ensler, she took part in a forum called "Jump" to promote gender equality internationally. In July 2019, Marie-Esméralda and her daughter Alexandra hiking Kilimanjaro to raise money for Hero Women Rising, an organization that is committed to education for girls in Congo.

=== Indigenous people's rights ===
In 1989, she supported Chief Raoni's campaign to protect the Amazonian forest with the help of internationally renowned singer Sting. King Leopold had met Raoni in 1964. In 2011, while Europalia Brasil was taking place, Marie-Esméralda met a delegation of Mehinako Indians. The following year, the Mehinako Indians honoured the memory of the late King Leopold III in Xingu Park in a special ceremony. The only white people who have been recognised in the past along with their ancestors are the Vilas Boas brothers, founders of Xingu Park. In December 2015 at the Cop21 in Paris, Marie-Esméralda met members of the Kichwa tribe from Sarayaku in Ecuador. The Leopold III Fund has financed one of their projects. In July 2016, the princess visited the tribal group Xerente at Porteira in Brazil. She received a special welcome during a traditional ceremony. In Brasilia, she officially opened an exhibition of her father's photographs. She gave a speech highlighting the importance of protecting and promoting indigenous rights in the presence of the famous Indian Chief Alvaro Tukano. In December 2016, at the COP22 in Marrakesh, she took part in some events organised by the WECAN International Association. Their aim is to support indigenous, low-income, Global South, and other women most impacted by and fighting against climate change. In September 2017, Marie-Esméralda became the patron of the Campaign for the Amazonian Forest launched by the Association Movement Actions across the World.

=== Health-related issues ===
She is also a patron of The Princess Lilian Foundation which was established in 1958 by her late mother. Its initial objective was to send Belgian children to the United States if they had a serious heart condition and needed surgery. In the seventies, the foundation focused on organising high-level scientific meetings. Since the death of Princess Lilian, the foundation has created a visiting professorship.

In 2008, she spoke at a conference on mental health and well-being at the European community in Brussels.

Maria-Esmeralda is the honorary president of Care Belgium. She was the honorary president of Delphus until 2017, an association offering autistic children a week of assisted therapy with dolphins every year.

== Books ==
- Christian Dior, the early years 1947-1957. Vendome Press, New York, 2001.
- Léopold III, mon père. Editions Racine, 2001.
- Léopold III photographe. Editions Racine, 2006.
- Terre. Editions Racine, 2011.
- With Patrick Weber. Lilian, une princesse entre ombre et lumière. Editions Racine, 2012.
- With Christophe Vachaudez. Albert et Elisabeth. Editions Racine, 2014.
- Femmes prix Nobel de la Paix. Editions Avant-Propos, 2014.

== Filmography ==
- Léopold III mon père. 90 minute documentary by Nicolas Delvaulx for RTBF.
- Sur les pas du roi Albert Ier et de la reine Elisabeth mes grands-parents (2014) 140 minute documentary by Nicolas Delvaulx for RTBF.
- Virunga, de l’espoir pour tout un peuple by Nicolas Delvaulx.
