= UCL Wolfson Institute =

University department in London, England

Coordinates: 51.5242°N 0.1349°W

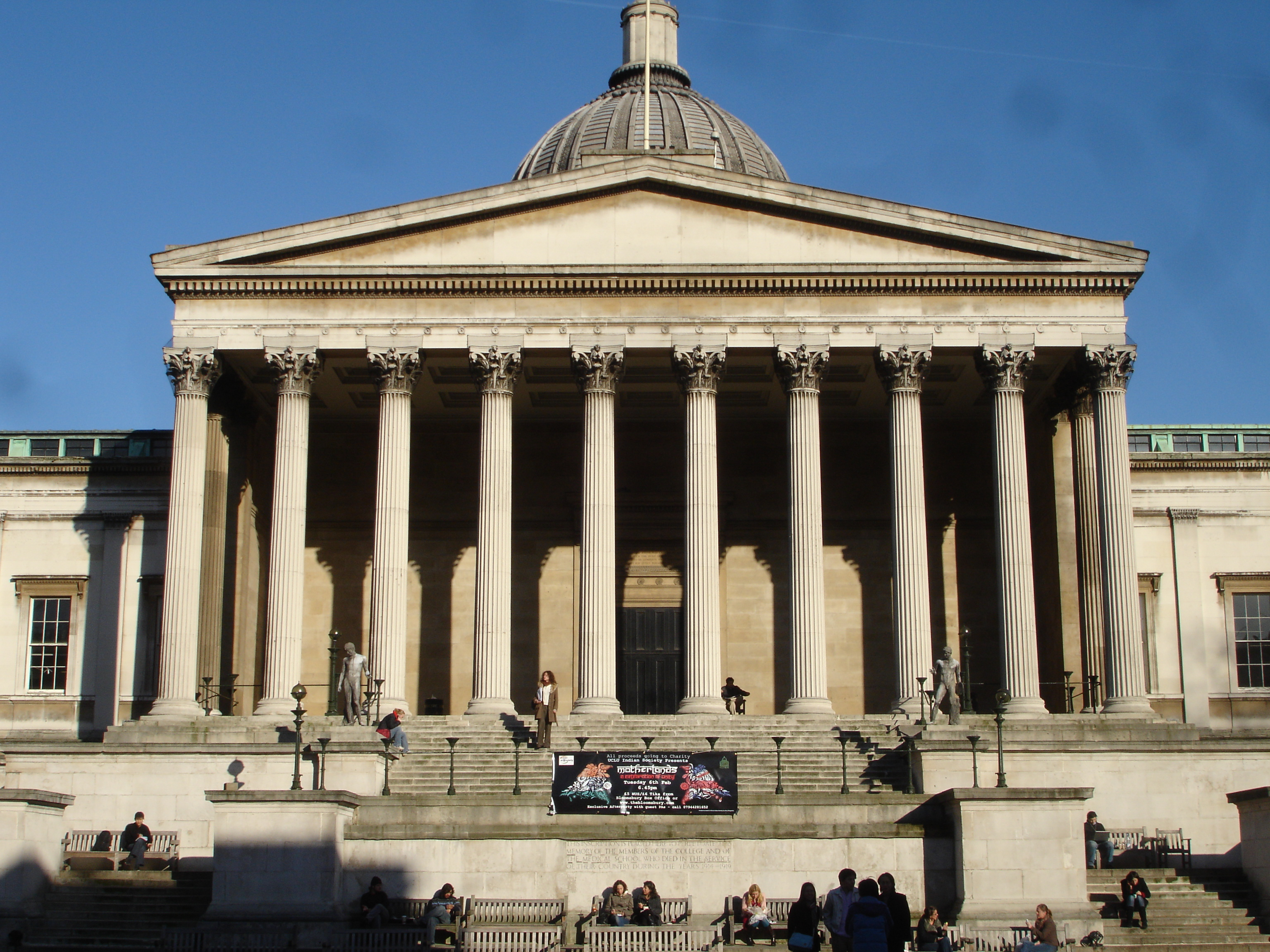
UCL Portico

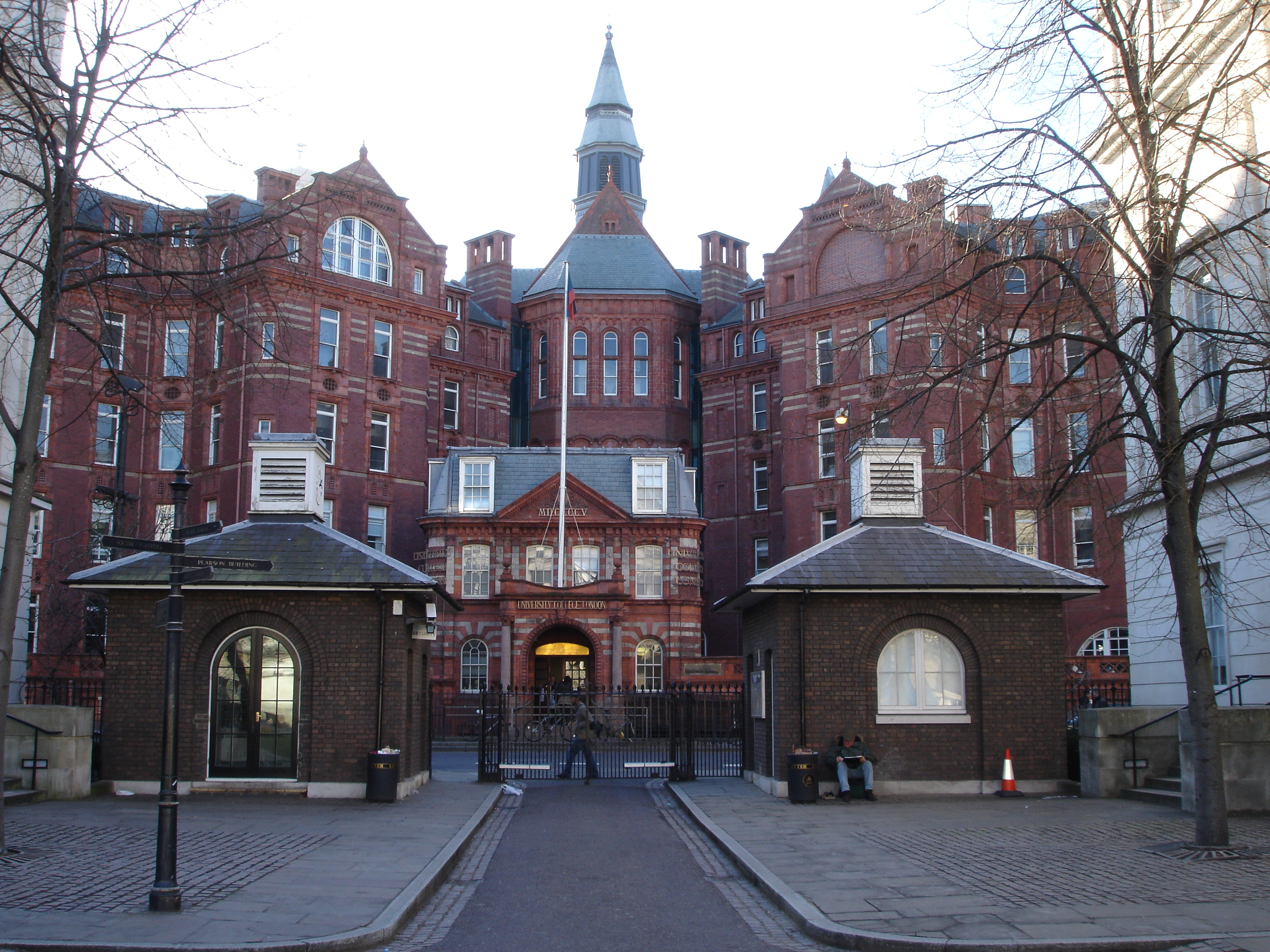
The Cruciform Building

The Wolfson Institute for Biomedical Research at UCL is an academic department of the Faculty of Biomedical Sciences of University College London located in London, England. The Institute is situated in the Cruciform Building, formerly the main building of University College Hospital, in the Bloomsbury district of Central London.

Originally named the Cruciform Project, its aim is to facilitate the interface between fundamental biological research and its application both to the discovery of new medicines and to clinical practice. The Institute now comprises more than 200 scientists, many of whom are of international standing.

== History ==
WIBR was established in 1995 as an Institute within UCL based in the Cruciform building, which underwent a £50 million renovation in order to create a modern infrastructure. Substantial grants to carry out the work were obtained from a number of funding bodies, notably The Wellcome Trust, the Higher Education Funding Council for England and The Wolfson Foundation and Charitable Family Trust.

The Institute Director was Prof. Salvador Moncada from 1995 - 2012. The current Institute Director is Dr. Beverley Clark

== Research ==
Research areas of the Institute include:

- Molecular Nociception
- Circuit Neuroscience
- Neural development, plasticity and repair
- Drug Discovery
- Cortical Processing

In the 2008 Research Assessment Exercise the 75% of the Institute's research was rated 4* (world leading) or 3* (internationally excellent).

== Education ==
The Institute provides teaching for both undergraduates and postgraduates via both internal and external programmes. Since 2010 a MSc in Drug Design is offered to life science graduates in biological sciences, chemical sciences and pharmacy.

== See also ==
- UCL Partners
- Francis Crick Institute
