= Albert II of Belgium =

King of the Belgians from 1993 to 2013

Albert II
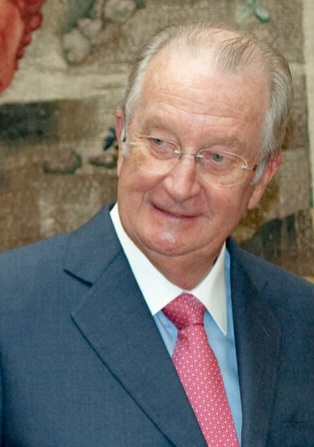
- Albert in 2010

King of the Belgians
- Reign: 9 August 1993 – 21 July 2013
- Predecessor: Baudouin
- Successor: Philippe
- Prime ministers: See list: Jean-Luc Dehaene Guy Verhofstadt Yves Leterme Herman Van Rompuy Yves Leterme Elio Di Rupo
- Born: 6 June 1934 (age 92); Château of Stuyvenberg, Brussels, Belgium
- Spouse: Paola Ruffo di Calabria (m. 1959)
- Issue: King Philippe; Princess Astrid, Archduchess of Austria-Este; Prince Laurent; Princess Delphine
Names
- Dutch: Albert Felix Humbert Theodoor Christiaan Eugen Maria; French: Albert Félix Humbert Théodore Christian Eugène Marie; German: Albert Felix Humbert Theodor Christian Eugen Maria
- House: Belgium
- Father: Leopold III of Belgium
- Mother: Astrid of Sweden

Albert II (Note: French: Albert Félix Humbert Théodore Christian Eugène Marie, pronounced [albɛʁ feliks œ̃bɛʁ teɔdɔʁ kʁistjɑ̃ øʒɛn maʁi]; Dutch: Albert Felix Humbert Theodoor Christiaan Eugène Marie, pronounced [ˈɑlbərt ˈfeːlɪks ˈɦʏmbərt teːjoːˈdoːr ˈkrɪstijaːn øːˈʑɛːn maːˈri]; German: Albrecht Felix Humbert Theodor Christian Eugen Maria, pronounced [ˈalbʁɛçt ˈfeːlɪks ˈhʊmbɛʁt ˈteːodoːɐ̯ ˈkʁɪsti̯a(ː)n ˈʔɔʏɡeːn maˈʁiːaː, - ˈʔɔʏɡn̩ -]) (born 6 June 1934) is a member of the Belgian royal family who reigned as King of the Belgians from 1993 until his abdication in 2013.

Albert II is the son of King Leopold III and the last living child of Queen Astrid, born a princess of Sweden. (Note: Princess Marie-Esméralda of Belgium and Princess Marie-Christine of Belgium, the two daughters of Leopold III and his second wife, Lilian, Princess of Réthy, are also still alive.) He is the younger brother of the late Grand Duchess Joséphine-Charlotte of Luxembourg and King Baudouin, whom he succeeded following Baudouin's death in 1993. He married Donna Paola Ruffo di Calabria (now Queen Paola), with whom he had three children. Albert's eldest son, Philippe, is the current King of the Belgians.

On 3 July 2013, King Albert II attended a midday session of the Belgian cabinet. He then announced that, on 21 July, Belgian National Day, he would abdicate the throne for health reasons. He was succeeded by his son Philippe on 21 July 2013. In doing so, he was also the second Belgian monarch to abdicate, following his father, Leopold III, who abdicated in 1951. His nephew is former Grand Duke of Luxembourg, Henri.

== Early life ==
Albert was born at the Château of Stuyvenberg in Laeken, northern Brussels, as the second son and youngest child of King Leopold III and his first wife, Princess Astrid of Sweden. He was second in line to the throne at birth, and was given the title Prince of Liège. When Albert was one year old, Queen Astrid died in Switzerland in a car accident on 29 August 1935, in which King Leopold, who was driving the vehicle, was lightly injured. The King remarried to Mary Lilian Baels (later became Princess of Réthy) in 1941. The couple produced three children: Prince Alexandre, Princess Marie-Christine and Princess Marie-Esméralda (who is also Albert's goddaughter). Albert and his siblings had a close relationship with their stepmother and they called her "Mother".

During World War II, on 10 May 1940, at the time when Belgium was being invaded, Albert, his elder sister Princess Joséphine-Charlotte and his elder brother Prince Baudouin, left the country for France and later Spain. The Prince and the Princess returned to Belgium on 2 August 1940. They continued their studies until 1944, either at Laeken, or at the Castle of Ciergnon in the Ardennes. In June 1944, at the time of the Allied landings, King Leopold, his wife Princess Lilian and the royal children were deported by the Germans to Hirschstein, Germany, and later to Strobl, Austria, where they were released by the American 106th Cavalry Regiment on 7 May 1945. Owing to the political situation in Belgium, King Leopold and his family moved to the villa "Le Reposoir" in Pregny, Switzerland, when they left Austria in October 1945 and stayed until July 1950. During that time, Albert would continue his education in a secondary school in Geneva. King Leopold III, accompanied by Prince Baudouin and Albert, returned to Belgium on 22 July 1950.

== Marriage and family ==
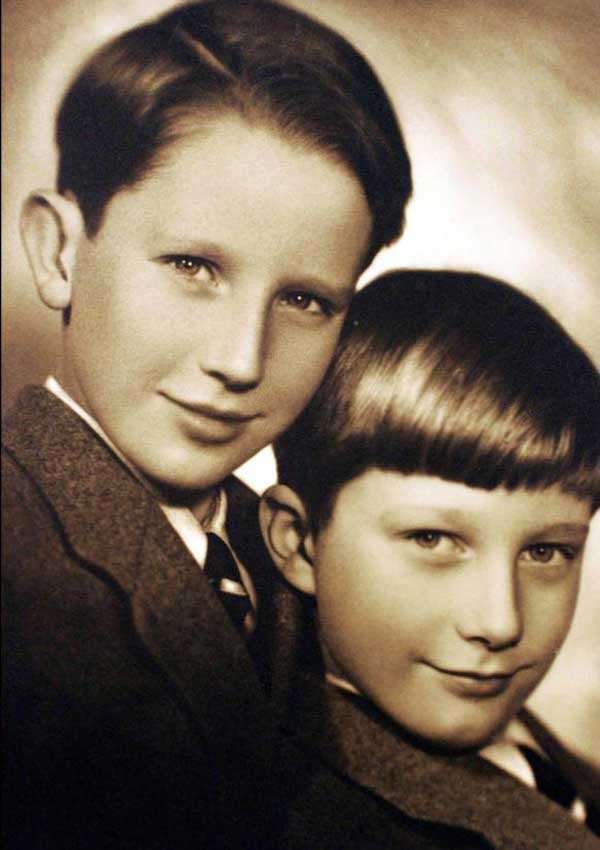
Albert (right) and his brother Baudouin, c. 1940

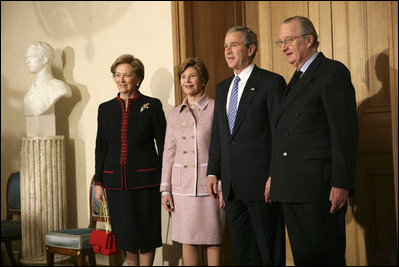
King Albert II and Queen Paola with US President George W. Bush and First Lady Laura Bush at the Royal Palace of Brussels in 2005

In 1958, Albert went to the Vatican to witness the coronation of Pope John XXIII. At a reception at the Belgian Embassy, he met Italian Donna Paola Ruffo di Calabria. Albert proposed marriage to her, to which she accepted. Two months after their meeting, he introduced his future wife to his family, and four months later to the press. The couple were married on 2 July 1959, one-and-a-half years before Albert's older brother, the king, got married (a marriage which would prove childless). Albert and Paola have three children, thirteen grandchildren and four great-grandchildren. Their children are:

- King Philippe (born 15 April 1960 at the Belvédère Château in Brussels)
- Princess Astrid (born 5 June 1962 at the Belvédère Château in Brussels)
- Prince Laurent (born 19 October 1963 at the Belvédère Château in Brussels)

=== Delphine Boël ===
In 1997, the Belgian satirical magazine Père Ubu reported that the Belgian sculptor Delphine Boël (born 22 February 1968) was King Albert II's extramarital daughter. It took some years for the Belgian mainstream media to report this news. According to Baroness Sybille de Selys Longchamps, the mother of Delphine, she and Albert shared an 18-year-long relationship from which Delphine was born.

In June 2013, Boël summoned the then King and his two older children (the then Duke of Brabant and the Archduchess of Austria-Este) to appear in court. She hoped to use DNA tests to prove that she is the King's daughter. As the King enjoyed complete immunity under the law, Boël decided to summon his elder children as well. The King abdicated the following month, in July 2013. After the King's abdication, Boël abandoned her first suit to introduce a second one only against the former King as he was no longer protected by immunity and the first claim would have been judged according to the situation at the time of the introduction of the claim.

In March 2017, the Court ruled that her claim was unfounded, and her lawyers said she would take the claim to appeal. On 25 October 2018, the Court of Appeal decided that Delphine Boël is not a descendant of Jacques Boël, and ordered King Albert to undergo DNA testing. His lawyer announced that he would seek further advice about a possible referral to Belgium's Cour de Cassation / Hof van Cassatie. In 2019, the King's lawyer confirmed he would not provide a DNA sample in the case.

On 29 May 2019, it was reported by CNN that Albert II had submitted a DNA sample after a Belgian court ruled on 16 May that he would be fined 5,000 euros for each day that he failed to do so, although he would continue to challenge the ruling, according to his attorney, Alain Berenboom. The results of these DNA samples were released on 27 January 2020 by Alain Berenboom, confirming Delphine Boël as Albert II's daughter. Albert II confirmed this on 27 January 2020 in a press release. "The king will treat all his children as equal," Berenboom said, according to VTM News. "King Albert now has four children."

While it was proven that Boël was his biological daughter, her legal status as a daughter was not recognized until a 1 October 2020 ruling of the Brussels Court of Appeal, which also recognized Boël as a princess of Belgium and granted her the new surname of Saxe-Coburg.

== Official role ==
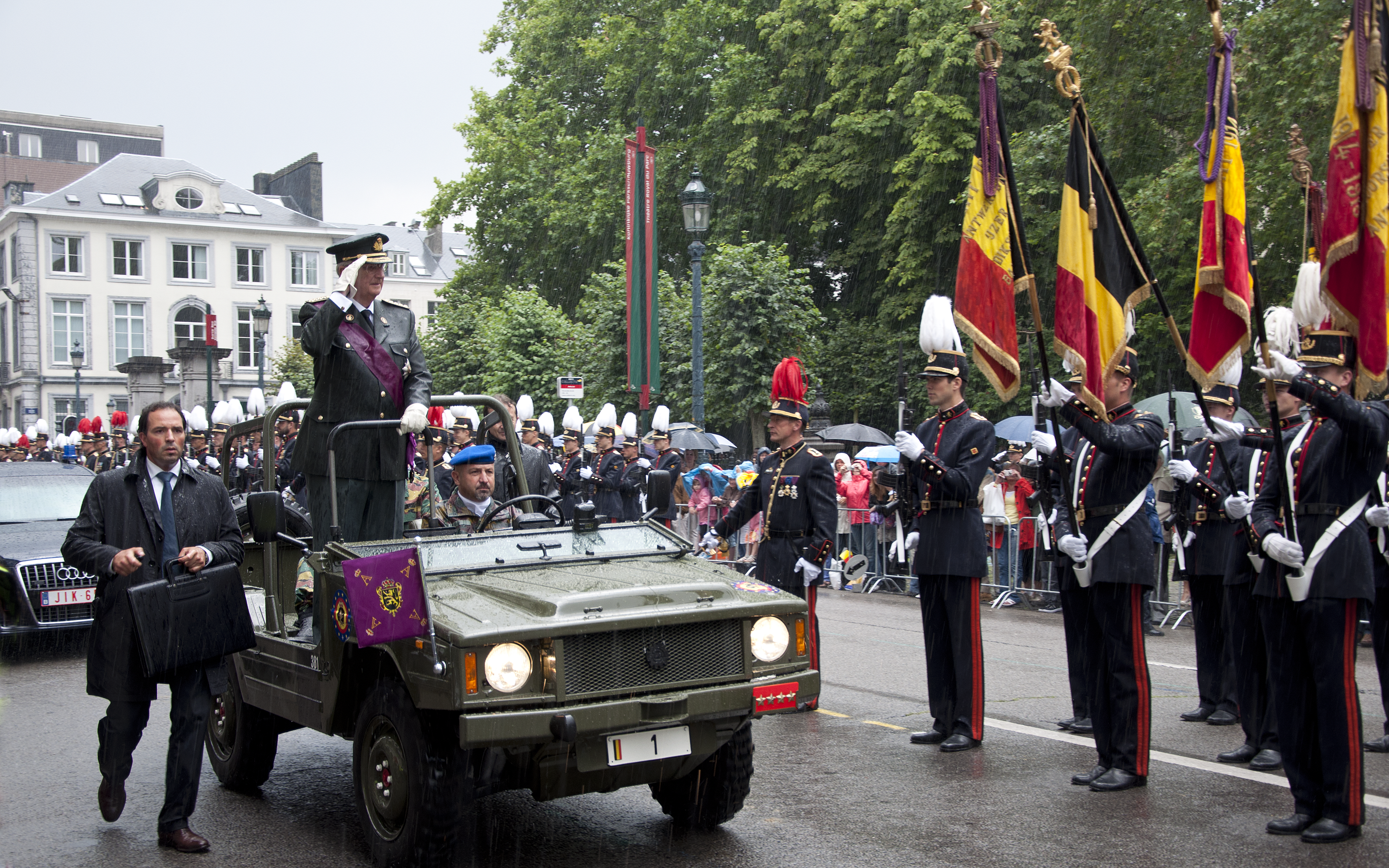
The King reviewing the army during the Belgian National Day, 2011

As the younger brother of the childless King Baudouin, Albert was the heir-presumptive to the throne. Albert's son Philippe was groomed to eventually succeed. On Baudouin's death, Albert was sworn in before parliament, on 9 August 1993, as King of the Belgians.

As King, Albert's duties included representing Belgium at home and abroad on state visits, trade missions, and at high level international meetings as well as taking an interest in Belgian society, culture and enterprise. The King had a constitutional role which came into play in 2010–2011 when Belgium's parliament was unable to agree on a government. When the crisis was resolved, Albert swore in the new government.

In 1984, Albert set up the Prince Albert Foundation, to promote expertise in foreign trade.

Albert sparked controversy in his December 2012 Christmas speech by comparing modern "populist movements" with those of the 1930s. This was seen by several political commentators, as well as many Flemish politicians, as aimed implicitly at the large Flemish nationalist party, the N-VA. Bart De Wever, the party's leader, called for the King's role in the formation of Belgian governments to be changed in the wake of this comment since he "could no longer see the monarch as playing the constitutional role of referee."

=== Abdication ===
On 3 July 2013, 79-year-old King Albert II attended a midday session of the Belgian cabinet, where he revealed his intention to abdicate to Prime Minister Elio Di Rupo and to the deputy prime ministers. This came less than one month after the King and two of his children had been asked to appear in court by the Belgian sculptor Delphine Boël, who was intent on proving that the King was her biological father. According to a letter sent by the King to the Prime Minister and dated 3 July 2013, and which was made public, the King had already broached the topic of his intention to abdicate several times with the Prime Minister, who had asked him to reconsider it. At 6 pm (CET) the King announced in a recorded radio and television speech that on 21 July, Belgium's National Day, he would abdicate the throne for health reasons. He was succeeded by his elder son, Philippe.

After his abdication on 21 July 2013 it was decided that he would be styled as His Majesty King Albert II, the same form of address granted to his father, Leopold III, after his abdication.

== Honours ==
Royal monogram of King Albert II of Belgium

Coat of arms as King of the Belgians

Personal Standard of King Albert II.

=== National honours ===
- Grand Cordon in the Order of Leopold

As King (1993-2013) he was Grand Master of:

  - The Order of the African Star
  - The Royal Order of the Lion
  - The Order of the Crown
  - The Order of Leopold II

=== Other European distinctions ===
- Grand Star of the Decoration of Honour for Services to the Republic of Austria (1958)
- Grand Cross of the Order of the Balkan Mountains (2003, Bulgaria)
- Grand Cross Special Class of the Order of Merit of the Federal Republic of Germany (West Germany)
- Knight of the Order of the Elephant (Denmark)
- Grand Cross of the Order of the Dannebrog (Denmark)
- Grand Cross with Collar of the Order of the Cross of Terra Mariana (5 June 2008, Estonia)
- Grand Cross of the Order of the White Rose of Finland (1996)
- Grand Cross of the Legion of Honour (France)
- Grand Cross of the Order of the Redeemer (Greece)
- Grand Cross of the Hungarian Order of Merit
- Grand Cross of the Order of the Falcon (16 October 1979, Iceland)
- Knight Grand Cross of the Order of Merit of the Italian Republic (29 October 1973, Italy)
- Knight Grand Cross of the Order of Saints Maurice and Lazarus (Italy)
- Knight of the Supreme Order of the Most Holy Annunciation (Italy)
- Commander Grand Cross of the Order of the Three Stars (Latvia)
- Grand Cross with Collar of the Order of Vytautas the Great (16 March 2006, Lithuania)
- Knight of the Order of the Golden Lion of Nassau (Luxembourg)
- Knight Grand Cross of the Order of Saint-Charles (13 October 1957, Monaco)
- Knight Grand Cross of the Order of the Netherlands Lion
- Knight Grand Cross of the Order of Orange-Nassau (Netherlands)
- Queen Beatrix Investiture Medal (Netherlands)
- Grand Cross of the Order of St. Olav (1964, Norway)
- St. Olavsmedaljen (Norway)
- Knight Grand Cross of Honour and Devotion of the Sovereign Military Order of Malta
- Grand Cross of the Order of Merit of the Republic of Poland
- Grand Collar in the Order of Prince Henry (13 December 1999, Portugal)
- Grand Cross of the Military Order of Aviz (11 December 1985, Portugal)
- Collar of the Order of the Star of Romania (2009)
- Grand Cross of the Order of the White Double Cross (Slovakia)
- Knight of the Order of the Golden Fleece (16 September 1994, Spain)
- Knight of the Order of the Seraphim (Sweden)
- King Carl XVI Gustaf Jubilee Medal (Sweden)
- Queen Elizabeth II Coronation Medal (UK)
- Queen Elizabeth II Golden Jubilee Medal (UK)
- Knight Grand Cross of the Royal Victorian Order (UK)
- Knight with the Collar of the Order of Pope Pius IX (Vatican)

=== Latin-American distinctions ===
- Grand Cross in the Order of the Liberator General San Martín (Argentina)
- Extraordinary Grand Cross of the Order of Boyacá (Colombia)
- Grand Collar of the National Order of San Lorenzo (Ecuador)
- Collar in the Order of the Aztec Eagle (Mexico)
- Grand Cross of the Order of the Sun of Peru, Special Class
- Grand Cross with Collar in the Order of the Liberator (Venezuela)

=== African distinctions ===
- Grand Cross in the Order of Merit (Cameroon)
- Grand Cordon in the National Order of the Leopard (R. Congo)
- Grand Cordon in the Order of the Republic (Egypt)
- Collar in the Order of the Queen of Sheba (Ethiopia)
- Grand Cross of the Order of the Equatorial Star (Gabon)
- Grand Cordon of the Order of the Throne (Morocco)
- Crand Cross of the Order of Merit (Senegal)
- Grand Cross in the Order of the Independence (Tunisia)

=== Asian and Middle-East distinctions ===
- 25th Centennial Anniversary Medal Ribbon (Iran)
- Grand Cordon in the Order of the Chrysanthemum (Japan)
- Grand Cross in the Grand Order of Mugunghwa (South-Korea)
- Honorary Grand Commander of the Most Esteemed Order of the Defender of the Realm (Malaysia)

=== Dynastic and religious honours ===
- Knight in the Supreme Order of the Most Holy Annunciation
- Knight in the Order of the Golden Fleece (Austrian Imperial Family)
- Knight of the Great Cross in the Order of the Holy Sepulchre

=== Honorary degrees ===
King Albert II is Doctor Honoris Causa of:

- the Catholic University of Leuven
- Saint Louis University, Baguio City
- Ghent University
- the Free University of Brussels
- the Catholic university of Mons
- the Polytechnic Faculty of Mons.

=== Eponym ===
- Boulevard du Roi Albert II/Koning Albert II-laan, Brussels.
- Boulevard Prince de Liège /Prins van Luiklaan, Brussels
- Institute King Albert II, University hospital of Saint-Luc.

=== Arms ===
Coat of arms of Albert II of Belgium
Notes As a former reigning monarch of Belgium, the king is entitled to use a coat of arms which was stipulated in the Royal Decree of King Philippe in 2019. Adopted 12 July 2019 Coronet Royal crown of Belgium Torse A lambrequin or lined with sable Helm A golden helmet sideways with the visor open Escutcheon Sable, a lion rampant or, armed and langued gules (Belgium), on the shoulder an escutcheon barry of ten sable and or, a crancelin vert (Wettin), overall a label of three points gules, the centre point a royal crown or. Supporters Two lions guardant proper each supporting a lance or with two National Flags of Belgium (Tierced per pale Sable, or and Gules). Motto French: L'union fait la force Dutch: Eendracht maakt macht German: Einigkeit macht stark Other elements The whole is placed on a mantle purpure with ermine lining, fringes and tassels or and ensigned with the Royal crown of Belgium. Previous versions Previously as reigning monarch, Albert used the royal coat of arms of Belgium undifferenced (shown above).

== See also ==
- Line of succession to the Belgian throne
- Crown Council of Belgium
- Royal Trust
- Prince Albert Fund
- Michel Didisheim, former private secretary
- Jacques van Ypersele de Strihou, former chief of the Kings Cabinet.
- Frank De Coninck, (former) Marshal of the Royal Household

== Notes ==
Albert II of Belgium House of Saxe-Coburg and Gotha Born: 6 June 1934
Regnal titles
Preceded by Baudouin	King of the Belgians; 1993–2013	Succeeded by Philippe
Academic offices
Preceded by Robert van Schendel	Invocation Speaker of the College of Europe; 1969	Succeeded by Jean Rey
