= Princess Léa of Belgium =

Belgian princess (born 1951)

Princess Léa
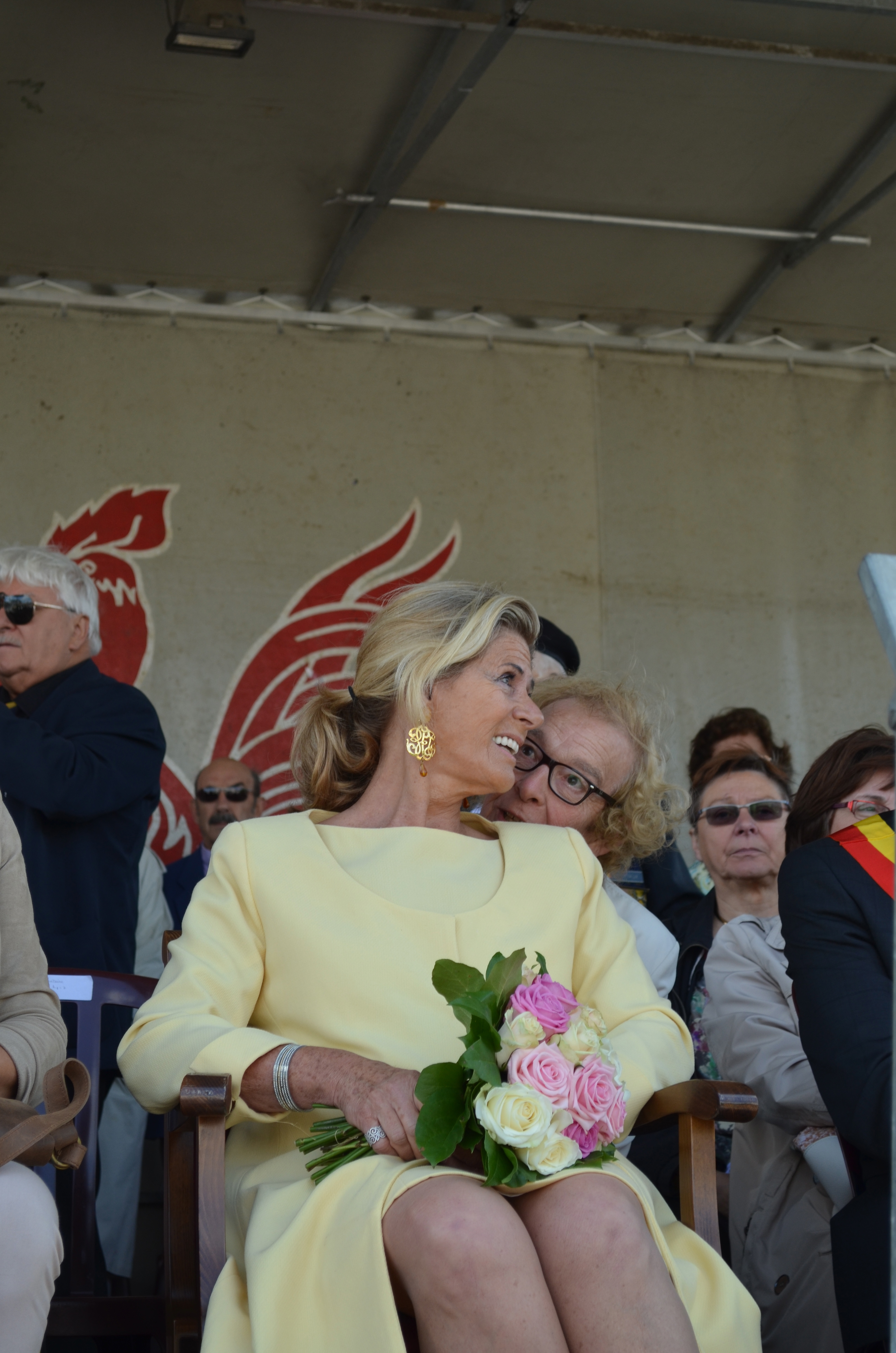
- Princess Léa in Charleroi on 13 June 2015
- Born: Léa Inga Dora Wolman; 2 December 1951 (age 74); Brussels, Belgium
- Spouses: Serge Victorovich Spetschinsky (m. 1975; div. 1980) Paul Robert Bichara (m. 1983; div. 1987) Prince Alexandre of Belgium (m. 1991; died 2009)
- Issue: Laetitia Spetschinsky; Renaud Bichara
- Father: Sigismund Wolman
- Mother: Lisa Bornstein

Styles of Princess Léa of Belgium
- Reference style: Her Royal Highness
- Spoken style: Your Royal Highness

Princess Léa of Belgium (born Léa Inga Dora Wolman; 2 December 1951) is a member of the Belgian Royal Family and the widow of Prince Alexandre of Belgium. She is an aunt by marriage of King Philippe of Belgium.

== Early life ==
Léa Inga Dora Wolman was born on 2 December 1951 as the daughter of Sigismund Wolman (born in Warsaw on 12 July 1906), a merchant in Brussels, and his wife Lisa Bornstein (born in Nürnberg). Of German descent, she grew up in Belgium.

== Marriages and issue ==
She married the Russian aristocrat Serge Victorovich Spetschinsky on 27 May 1975 in Brussels (son of Victor Sergeyevich Spetschinsky, President of the Russian Nobility Association in Belgium, and Elena Dmitrievna von Höbel), from whom she was divorced on 28 March 1980. They had a daughter, Laetitia Spetschinsky (born in 1976), who is now married to HE Didier Nagant de Deuxchaisnes, Ambassador of Belgium to Ethiopia, and mother of three children.

On 23 July 1983, she married Paul Robert Bichara in Uccle, and they had a son, Renaud Bichara (born 1 September 1983).

After her second divorce on 25 August 1987, she wed Prince Alexander in Debenham, Suffolk, on 14 March 1991. They had been introduced in 1986 by former defence minister Léon Mundeleer. Alexander asked her to accompany him to the cinema. She vacillated initially, but they began to enjoy dining out together, Alexander being a gourmand, according to his future wife.

The couple had no children together, and the marriage was kept secret until 1998, as reportedly the prince feared his mother, Princess de Réthy, would disapprove.

== Published work ==
In 2008, she published a book of photographs from the life of her husband and his family, titled Le Prince Alexandre de Belgique, because she felt that he was too little known in Belgium.

== Sources ==
- "Monarchies of Europe".
