= Salvador Moncada =

Honduran pharmacologist and professor

Sir Salvador Moncada FRS FRCP FMedSci
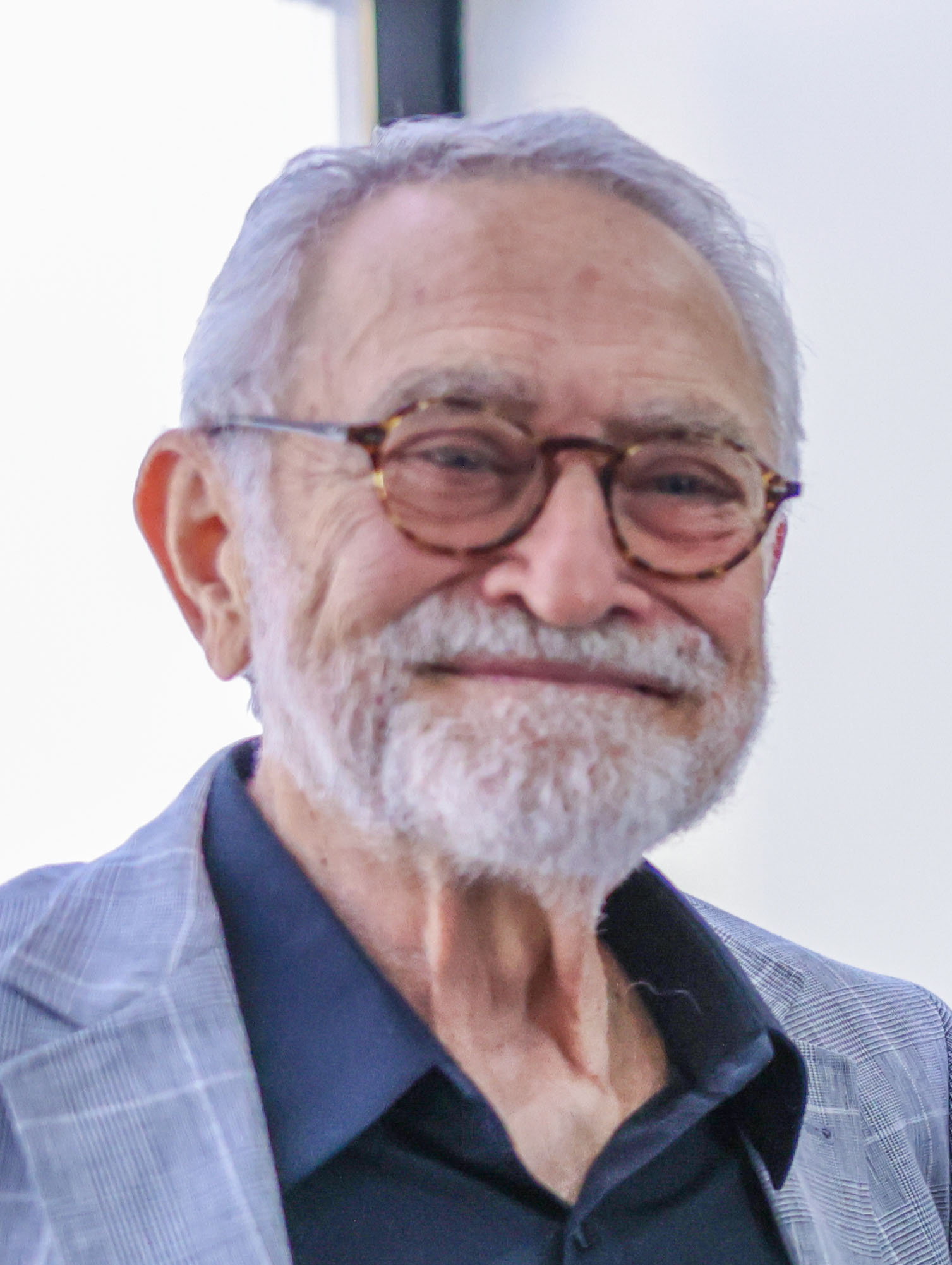
- Moncada in 2022
- Born: 3 December 1944 (age 81); Tegucigalpa, Honduras
- Other name: Salvador Enrique Moncada Seidner
- Citizenship: United Kingdom; Honduras
- Education: University of El Salvador (MD); University of London (PhD, DSc)
- Known for: Prostacyclin
- Spouses: Dorys Lemus (divorced); Princess Marie-Esméralda of Belgium (m. 1998)
- Children: 4
- Awards: FRS (1988); FRCP; FMedSci
- Scientific career
- Fields: Pharmacology
- Workplaces: University of Manchester; University College London
- Website: manchester.ac.uk/research/salvador.moncada

Sir Salvador Enrique Moncada Seidner (born 3 December 1944) is a Honduran-British pharmacologist and professor. He is currently Research Domain Director for Cancer at the University of Manchester.

In the past, he was the Research Director of the Wellcome Research Laboratories from 1986 to 1995 and, until recently, the Director of the UCL Wolfson Institute, which he established at University College London in 1996. His research interests include inflammation and vascular biology and he is currently working on the regulation of cell proliferation. He gained fame for his discoveries related to nitric oxide function and metabolism, and his exclusion from the 1996 Lasker Award and the 1998 Nobel Prize in medicine.

Moncada was nominated by Xiomara Castro, the President of Honduras, to serve as their first Ambassador to China following the Honduran government's recognition of the People's Republic of China in March 2023. The Embassy in Beijing was opened in June 2023.

== Early life and education ==
Moncada was born in Tegucigalpa, Honduras, to Salvador Moncada and Jenny Seidner on 3 December 1944, and moved to El Salvador in 1948. He attended the secondary School Instituto Nacional in San Salvador (El Salvador) between 1957 and 1961. In 1962, he went to study medicine at the University of El Salvador where he received an MD degree in 1970. In 1971 he went to London to work on a research doctorate with John Vane at the Department of Pharmacology of the Institute of Basic Medical Sciences, Royal College of Surgeons. In 1974, Moncada obtained a PhD in Pharmacology from the University of London. After a short period of research at the National Autonomous University of Honduras between 1974 and 1975, he moved to the Wellcome Research Laboratories (Beckenham, Kent), where he became director of research in 1986. During this period he also received a higher DSc degree from the University of London in 1983. In 1996, Moncada moved to this university, where he was director of the UCL Wolfson Institute (formerly known as The Cruciform Project for Strategic Medical Research) until 2011 and a professor of experimental biology and therapeutics until 2013.

== Research ==
His scientific career began at the Royal College of Surgeons, where he collaborated in the discovery that aspirin-like drugs inhibit prostaglandin biosynthesis. This finding elucidated the mechanism by which these drugs act as analgesic, antipyretic, and anti-inflammatory agents and also explained the mechanism by which they cause gastric damage. In 1975, at the Wellcome Research Laboratories, he led the team that discovered the enzyme thromboxane synthase and the vasodilator prostacyclin. This work contributed to the understanding of how low doses of aspirin prevent cardiovascular episodes such as myocardial infarction and stroke. As director of research at the Wellcome Research Laboratories he presided over the discovery and development of lamotrigine (an anti-epileptic compound), atovaquone (an anti-malarial) and zomig (for treatment of migraine headaches), and initiated the work that resulted in the development of lapatinib for the treatment of breast cancer. He was also responsible for the identification of nitric oxide as a biological mediator and the elucidation of the metabolic pathway leading to its synthesis. A great deal of the early work on the biological significance of nitric oxide in the cardiovascular system came from his laboratory, as well as some fundamental information about the role of nitric oxide in the peripheral and central nervous systems and in cancer. His later work has focused on the areas of mitochondrial biology and cell metabolism. Most recently, his work has led to the finding of the molecular mechanism that coordinates cell proliferation with the provision of metabolic substrates required for this process.

=== Publications ===
Moncada is the author of more than 500 peer-reviewed papers and highly cited reviews, including

- Ferreira, S. H.; Moncada, S.; Vane, J. R. (1971). "Indomethacin and Aspirin abolish Prostaglandin Release from the Spleen". Nature New Biology. 231 (25): 237–9. doi:10.1038/newbio231237a0. PMID 5284362.
- Needleman, P.; Moncada, S.; Bunting, S.; Vane, J. R.; Hamberg, M.; Samuelsson, B. (1976). "Identification of an enzyme in platelet microsomes which generates thromboxane A2 from prostaglandin endoperoxides". Nature. 261 (5561): 558–60. Bibcode:1976Natur.261..558N. doi:10.1038/261558a0. PMID 934294. S2CID 4177705.
- Moncada, S.; Gryglewski, R.; Bunting, S.; Vane, J. R. (1976). "An enzyme isolated from arteries transforms prostaglandin endoperoxides to an unstable substance that inhibits platelet aggregation". Nature. 263 (5579): 663–5. Bibcode:1976Natur.263..663M. doi:10.1038/263663a0. PMID 802670. S2CID 4279030.
- Moncada, S. (1982). "Eighth Gaddum Memorial Lecture University of London Institute of Education December 1980: Biological Importance of Prostacyclin". British Journal of Pharmacology. 76 (1): 3–31. doi:10.1111/j.1476-5381.1982.tb09186.x. PMC 2068748. PMID 7044460.
- Palmer, R. M.; Ferrige, A. G.; Moncada, S (1987). "Nitric oxide release accounts for the biological activity of endothelium-derived relaxing factor". Nature. 327 (6122): 524–6. Bibcode:1987Natur.327..524P. doi:10.1038/327524a0. PMID 3495737. S2CID 4305207.
- Palmer, R. M. J.; Ashton, D. S.; Moncada, S. (1988). "Vascular endothelial cells synthesize nitric oxide from L-arginine". Nature. 333 (6174): 664–6. Bibcode:1988Natur.333..664P. doi:10.1038/333664a0. PMID 3131684. S2CID 4329084.
- Rees, D. D.; Palmer, R. M.; Moncada, S (1989). "Role of endothelium-derived nitric oxide in the regulation of blood pressure". Proceedings of the National Academy of Sciences of the United States of America. 86 (9): 3375–8. Bibcode:1989PNAS...86.3375R. doi:10.1073/pnas.86.9.3375. PMC 287135. PMID 2497467.
- Moncada, S. (2006). "Adventures in vascular biology: A tale of two mediators". Philosophical Transactions of the Royal Society B: Biological Sciences. 361 (1469): 735–759. doi:10.1098/rstb.2005.1775. PMC 1609404. PMID 16627292.
- Almeida, A.; Bolanos, J. P.; Moncada, S. (2009). "E3 ubiquitin ligase APC/C-Cdh1 accounts for the Warburg effect by linking glycolysis to cell proliferation". Proceedings of the National Academy of Sciences. 107 (2): 738–41. doi:10.1073/pnas.0913668107. PMC 2818939. PMID 20080744.

=== Other interests ===
Moncada is interested in medical education and in the development of science and technology in Latin America. He has been a consultant of the Panamerican Health Organization (PAHO, the regional office of the WHO) and in recent years he founded Honduras Global – an international network of experts involved in supporting the development of Honduras.

== Awards and honours ==
Moncada is an elected member of a number of international scientific societies. Foreign Member of the National Academy of Sciences of the United States of America (1994); Fellow of the Royal College of Physicians, London (1994), and Honorary Fellow of University College London (1999). He was elected a Fellow of the Royal Society (FRS) in 1988.

He has received honorary degrees from more than twenty universities, including Honorary Degree of Doctor of Science, Mount Sinai School of Medicine, New York City (1995); Degree of Doctor "Honoris Causa" of the University Pierre & Marie Curie, Paris, France (1997) and Honorary Degree of Doctor of Science of the University of Edinburgh, Scotland (2000).

His prizes and distinguished lectures include: The VIII Gaddum Memorial Lecture, British Pharmacological Society (1980); The Prince of Asturias Award (1990); The Ulf von Euler Memorial Lecture, Karolinska Institute, Stockholm, Sweden (1991); The Paul Dudley White Lecture, American Heart Association, Anaheim, California, USA (1991); The Royal Medal of the Royal Society, UK (1994); The Gregory Pincus Memorial Lecture, the Worcester Foundation for Biomedical Research, Massachusetts, USA (1996); The Louis and Artur Lucian Award (jointly with Prof. R. Furchgott), McGill University, Montreal, Canada (1997); The Bayliss-Starling Prize Lecture to the Physiological Society, UK (2000); The Gold Medal of the Royal Society of Medicine, UK (2000); Le Grand Prix Annuel Lefoulon-Delalande, from the Institut de France, Paris (2002); the Croonian Lecture at the Royal Society, London, UK (2005), the Debrecen Award for Molecular Medicine from the University of Debrecen, Hungary (2011) and The Dohme Lecture, The Johns Hopkins University School of Medicine, Baltimore (2010).

In the 2010 New Year Honours, Moncada was knighted for Services to Science by Queen Elizabeth II. In 2013 he was awarded the Ernst Jung Gold Medal for Medicine (Ernst Jung Prize).

== Personal life ==
He was married to Dorys Lemus, a biochemistry teacher at the Medical School in El Salvador. The marriage resulted in two children, Claudia Regina (born 1966 – a G.P. who lives in London) and Salvador Ernesto (1972–1982). On 5 April 1998, in London, he married Princess Marie-Esméralda of Belgium. They have two children, Alexandra Leopoldine (born in London on 4 August 1998) and Leopoldo Daniel (born in London on 21 May 2001), and two grandchildren.
