= Jean de Selys Longchamps =

Belgian fighter pilot (1912–1943)

Baron Jean de Selys Longchamps DFC
- Born: 31 May 1912; Brussels, Belgium
- Died: 16 August 1943 (aged 31); Manston, Kent, England
- Military career
- Allegiance: Belgium
- Branch: Belgian Army (until 1940); Royal Air Force (1940–1943)
- Rank: Captain (Belgian Army); Flying Officer (RAF)
- Unit: No. 609 Squadron RAF
- Conflicts: Second World War; European air campaign †
- Awards: Knight of the Order of Leopold (Posthumous); War cross WWII with palm Distinguished Flying Cross Coat of arms of Selys Longchamps

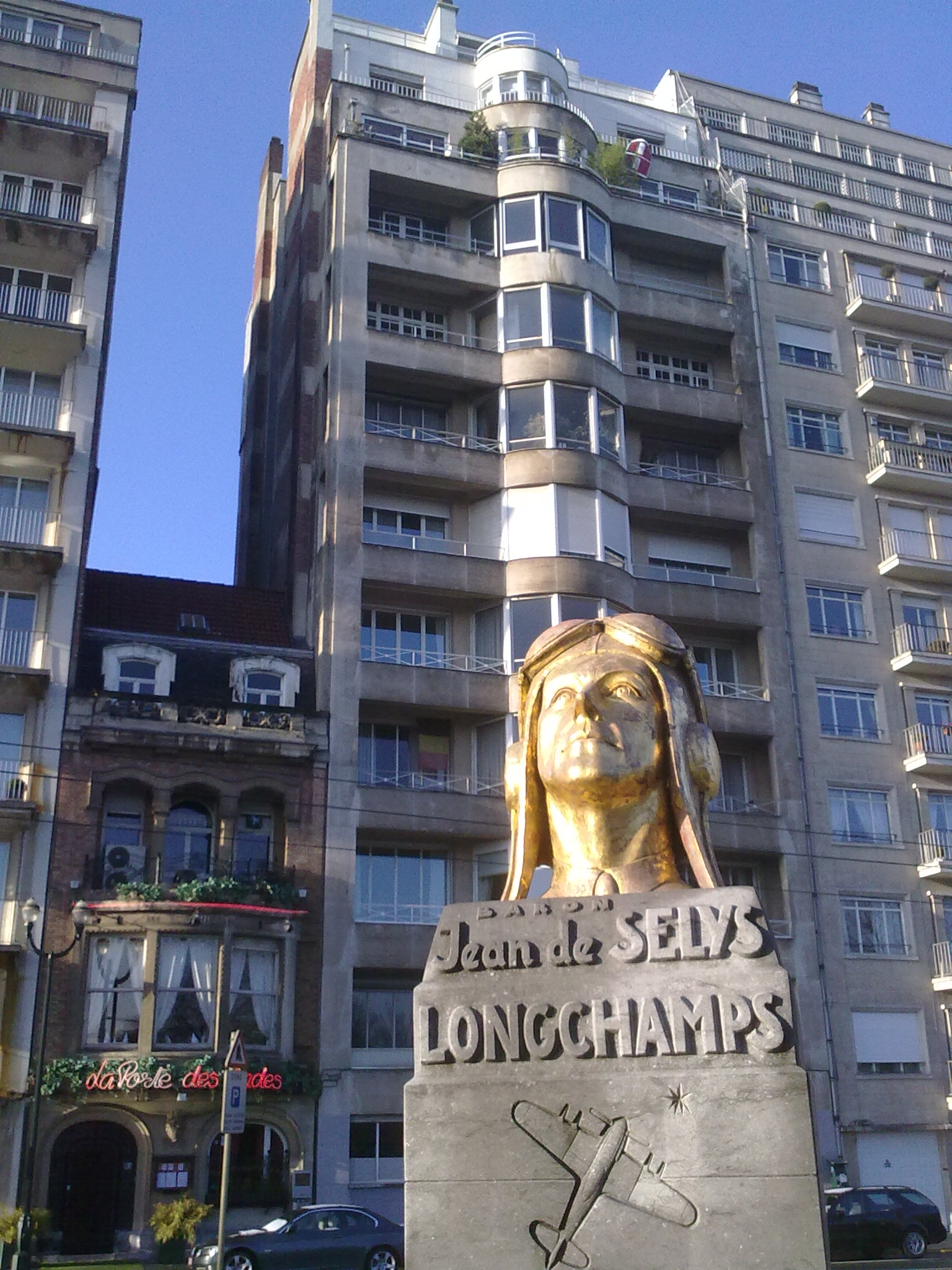
Bust of Selys Longchamps in front of his target, the former Gestapo headquarters, looking up along his attack path. The Hawker Typhoon figure shows the distinctive cannon.

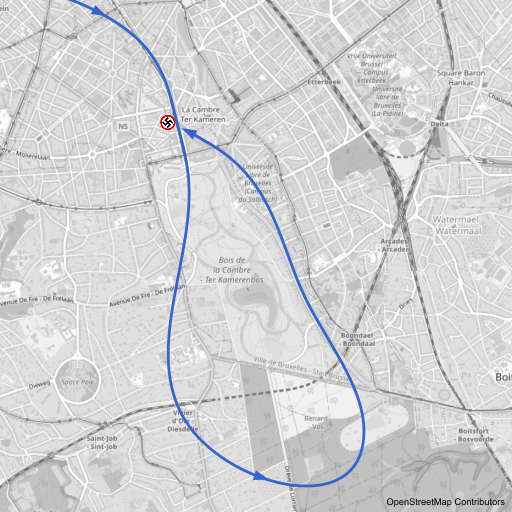
Estimated path of Selys Longchamps' strafing run.

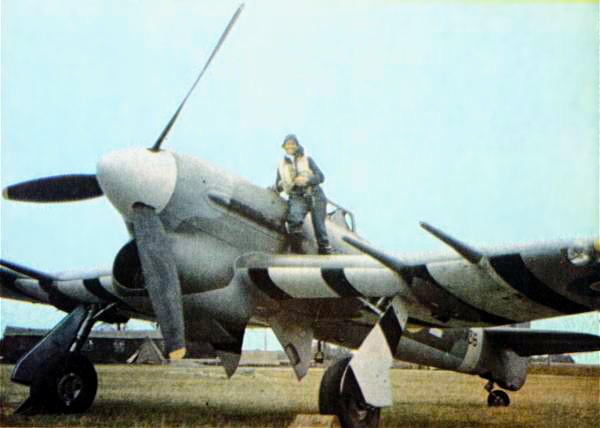
Hawker Typhoon of a type similar to the one used in the attack

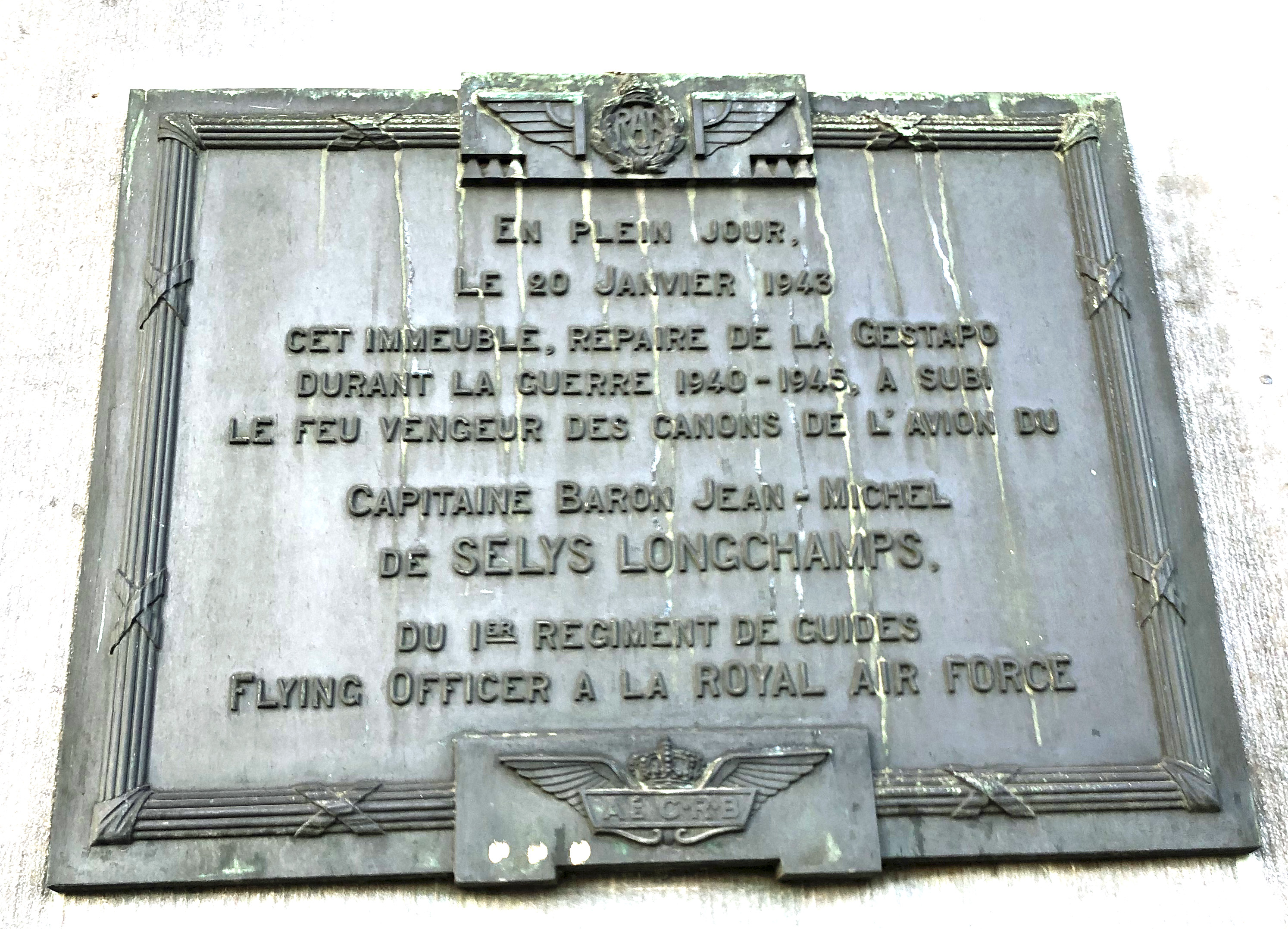
Commemorative plaque affixed to the target building, showing de Selys Longschamps' military rank of Captain (Belgian Army) and Flying officer (Royal Air Force).

Baron Jean Michel P.M.G. de Selys Longchamps DFC (31 May 1912 – 16 August 1943) was a Belgian aristocrat and RAF fighter pilot during World War II. He is chiefly known for his single-handed attack on the Gestapo headquarters in Brussels in German-occupied Belgium.

== Early life ==
Baron Jean de Selys Longchamps, DFC was born into Belgian nobility, historically residing in Longchamps Castle (now a gîte) in Borgworm near Liège. He inherited the title of baron from his father, Baron Raymond Charles Michel Ghislain de Selys Longchamps. He dropped out of the Catholic University of Leuven and then started his professional career as a bank clerk.

== Early military career ==
At the outbreak of the war, Selys Longchamps was drafted into the Belgian Army, in which he was commissioned as a cavalry officer with the 1er Régiment des Guides. He managed to escape with the British forces from Dunkirk, only to return to France shortly after and be faced with France's capitulation. He tried to join the allies again by way of Morocco, where he was arrested by the Vichy French authorities and sent into internment in Marseille. He escaped and travelling via Francoist Spain, was able to reach Britain, where he – after purporting to be younger than his age of 28 – was accepted for flight training with the RAF. He was posted to No. 609 Squadron RAF, and flying Hawker Typhoons quickly made a name as an able and aggressive pilot.

== Attack on the Gestapo headquarters in Brussels ==
Immediately upon the fall of Belgium on May 10, 1940, the Gestapo commandeered Résidence Belvédère, a luxurious Art Deco apartment building located at 453 Avenue Louise (Note: The building still exists and can be found at 50°49′4.37″N 4°22′15.63″E) in Brussels as its headquarters, and tortured prisoners in its cellars.

Longchamps devised a plan to strafe the building in order to raise the morale of occupied Belgians, which RAF command repeatedly declined. Myths have claimed his motivation being the torture and death of his father at the hands of the Gestapo. His father, Raymond de Selys Longchamps, however, died peacefully in 1966, having received recognition for his and his family's (including Jean's) valiant efforts in the war.

On January 20, 1943, Longchamps completed an approved railway strafing mission over Ghent, then ordered his wingman (flight sergeant André Blanco) back to base and set out without approval for Brussels, some 50 kilometres (31 mi) to the south-east.

Longchamps first flew his Typhoon down the Avenue Louise to make a high-speed pass of the target building, reportedly to have the roar of the Napier Sabre engine draw Gestapo personnel to the unprotected windows. Using the ample manoeuvering space above the Bois de la Cambre parc, he then turned to the Avenue de la Nation, (Note: after the war renamed Avenue Franklin Roosevelt) using it as a low-level attack path. He continued through the left turn of the connecting Avenue Emile De Mot to an unobstructed and fairly frontal firing position with little risk of collateral damage and raked the target with his four 20 mm Hispano autocannons, resulting in the death of SS-Obersturmführer Werner Vogt of the SiPo, SS-Sturmbannführer Alfred Thomas, head of Abteilung III of the Sicherheitsdienst (SD) in Belgium, a high-ranking Gestapo officer named Müller, and others.

Longchamps had a bag of small Belgian flags made by Belgian refugee schoolchildren in London. After the attack, he scattered the small Belgian flags across Brussels, dropped a Union Jack and a large Belgian flag at the Royal Palace in Laeken, and dropped another at the garden of his niece, the Baroness de Villegas de Saint-Pierre.

Upon his return, Longchamps was demoted to pilot officer, but this had been planned already before the unauthorised raid. He was soon after awarded the Distinguished Flying Cross for his actions. Some resistance sources claimed a death toll as high as thirty, while the Nazis admitted four fatalities and five serious injuries. A bust near the site commemorates Longchamps' actions.

== Death ==
On August 16, 1943, Selys Longchamps was killed while attempting to land at RAF Manston, his landing gear having been damaged by German Flak during a mission over Ostend. A commemoration of his life was held on 16 August 2013 in conjunction with the Royal British Legion and Wings Of Memory from Belgium.

== Honours and awards ==

- Knight of the order of Leopold (posthumous)
- War cross WWII with palm
- Distinguished flying cross (United Kingdom)

== Family ==
Jean's brother, François de Selys Longchamps, was the father of Baroness Sybille de Selys Longchamps, the former mistress of King Albert II, with whom she had a daughter, Princess Delphine (who since October 2020 can legally bear the title of "Her Royal Highness"). Her legal name though is now Delphine Saxe-Coburg.

== See also ==
- Ken Gatward#Operation Squabble
