= Queen Mathilde of Belgium =

Queen of the Belgians since 2013

Mathilde
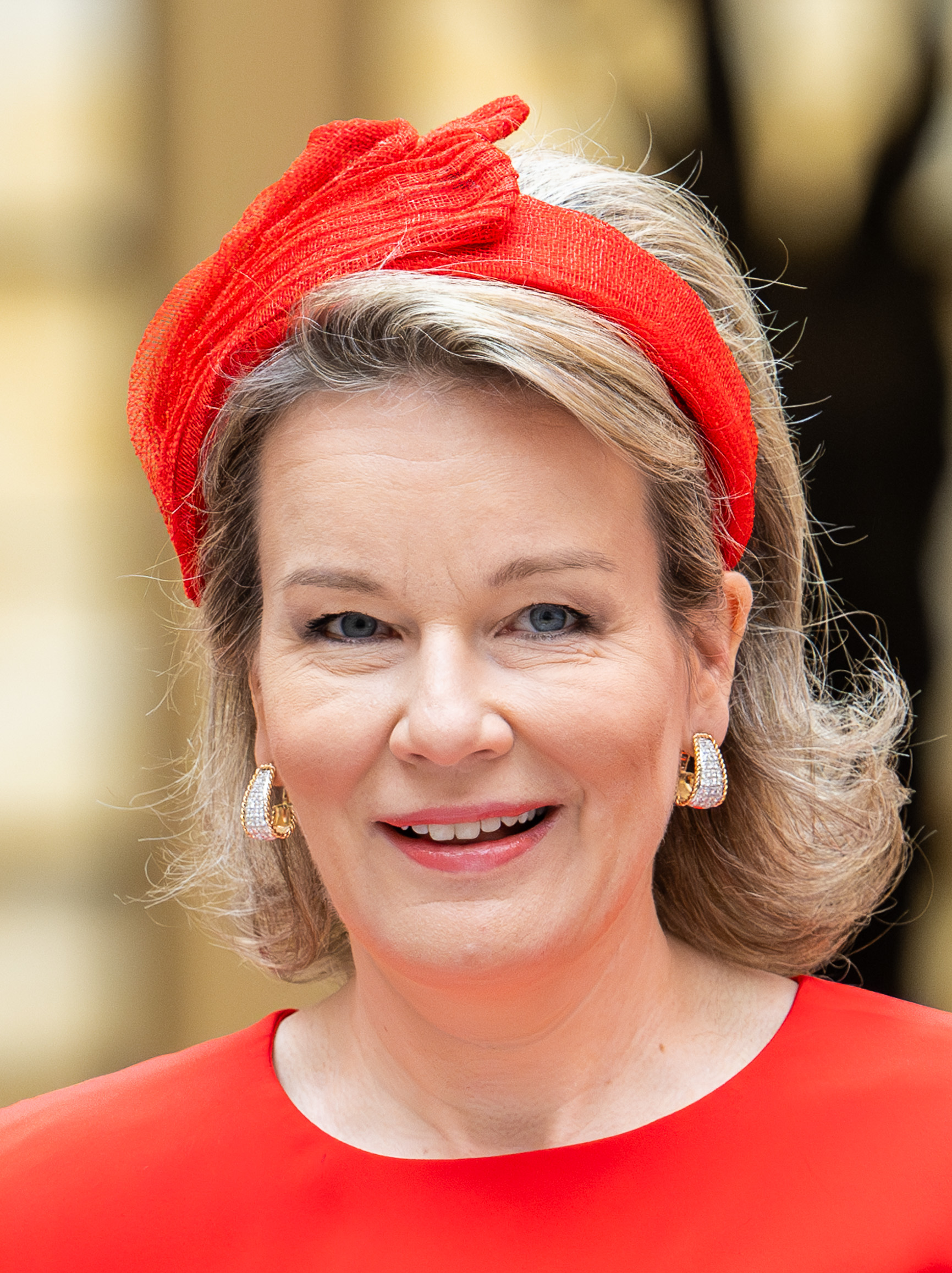
- Mathilde in 2024

Queen consort of the Belgians
- Tenure: 21 July 2013 – present
- Born: Jonkvrouw Mathilde Marie Christine Ghislaine d'Udekem d'Acoz; 20 January 1973 (age 53); Edith Cavell Hospital, Uccle, Belgium
- Spouse: Philippe of Belgium (m. 1999)
- Issue: Princess Elisabeth, Duchess of Brabant; Prince Gabriel; Prince Emmanuel; Princess Eléonore
- House: d'Udekem d'Acoz (by birth); Belgium (by marriage)
- Father: Count Patrick d'Udekem d'Acoz
- Mother: Countess Anna Maria Komorowska

Mathilde Marie Christine Ghislaine d'Udekem d'Acoz (Note: Belgian women do not change their surname upon marriage.) (pronounced [matild dyd(ə)kɛm dakɔ]; born 20 January 1973) is Queen of the Belgians as the wife of King Philippe.

She is the first native-born Belgian queen, and has four children. She formerly worked as a speech therapist. She is involved with a range of organisations which address social issues including education, child poverty, intergenerational poverty, the position of women in society and literacy.

== Early life and family ==
Jonkvrouw Mathilde Marie Christine Ghislaine d'Udekem d'Acoz was born on 20 January 1973 at Edith Cavell Hospital in Uccle, Brussels, Belgium. Her parents are Count Patrick d'Udekem d'Acoz (1936–2008), a politician, and his wife, Countess Anna Maria Komorowska (b. 1946). Mathilde has three sisters: Marie-Alix (1974–1997), Elisabeth (b. 1977, a speech therapist) and Hélène (b. 1979, a lawyer), and one brother Charles-Henri (b. 1985, a lawyer). Her godfather is her uncle, Count Raoul d'Udekem d'Acoz.

Mathilde grew up in the Château de Losange in Villers-la-Bonne-Eau. At the age of 17, she lived with her three sisters in an apartment at Boulevard Auguste Reyers, Schaarbeek.

== Education and career ==
Mathilde attended primary school in Bastogne and then attended secondary school at the Institut de la Vierge Fidèle in Brussels. At the age of 18, Mathilde did voluntary work in the slums of Cairo for six weeks. From 1991 until 1994, Mathilde attended the Institut Libre Marie Haps in Brussels, where she studied speech therapy and graduated magna cum laude. She worked as a speech therapist in her own practice in Brussels from 1995 to 1999. She also worked in several Brussels schools. She earned a master's degree in psychology at the Université catholique de Louvain in 2002 with honours (cum laude). Mathilde became the first member of the Belgian royal family with a Belgian university degree. She also took a ten-day leadership course at Harvard University in 2011.

Mathilde speaks French, Dutch, English and Italian. She is also able to speak basic Spanish. Her mother, a member of an old Polish aristocratic Komorowski family but who has lived most of her life outside Poland, did not teach her Polish, thinking that it would not be necessary. Therefore, she knows only a few words of Polish.

== Marriage and children ==
Jonkvrouw Mathilde d'Udekem d'Acoz met Prince Philippe, Duke of Brabant while playing tennis in 1996. In September 1999, the Belgian Royal Court announced the engagement of Prince Philippe to Mathilde. Mathilde was presented to the press and public at the Castle of Laeken on 13 September 1999. The announcement of Mathilde's engagement to the Belgian heir-apparent Prince Philippe came as a surprise to the country. Mathilde married Philippe on 4 December 1999 in Brussels, civilly at the Brussels Town Hall and religiously at the Cathedral of St. Michael and St. Gudula. Mathilde's bridal gown was designed by Édouard Vermeulen. She was made Duchess of Brabant and a Princess of Belgium on 8 November 1999 (published on 13 November 1999 and effective from 4 December 1999). The couple reportedly spent their honeymoon in the Maldives and India.

Upon her marriage to Prince Philippe in 1999, King Albert II of Belgium elevated the d'Udekem d'Acoz family from the baronial to the comital rank, hereditary in the male lineage.

The couple have four children:

- Princess Elisabeth, Duchess of Brabant, born 25 October 2001 at Erasmus Hospital in Anderlecht, Brussels
- Prince Gabriel, born 20 August 2003 at Erasmus Hospital in Anderlecht, Brussels
- Prince Emmanuel, born 4 October 2005 at Erasmus Hospital in Anderlecht, Brussels
- Princess Eléonore, born 16 April 2008 at Erasmus Hospital in Anderlecht, Brussels

Princess Elisabeth, the couple's eldest child, is the first in line to the throne and ahead of her younger brothers and sister, who are second, third, and fourth in line to succeed, owing to a change in Belgian succession laws in 1991, allowing for the eldest child to succeed, regardless of sex.

Queen Mathilde is a godmother to Princess Alexia of the Netherlands and Princess Isabella of Denmark. Queen Mathilde is also a godmother to girls named Hyle-Mathilde Blakaj, Zaineb Tebbi and Madinah Mohammed Ibrahim, the seventh daughters of families from Charleroi and Ghent. Belgian tradition stated that the seventh daughter from an uninterrupted line of girls has the privilege of asking the Queen to be her godmother.

== Queen Consort ==
King Albert II announced on 3 July 2013 that he would abdicate in favour of Philippe on 21 July 2013. Approximately one hour after King Albert II's abdication, Prince Philippe was sworn in as King of the Belgians. Upon his accession, Mathilde became the first queen consort of native Belgian nationality. (An earlier Belgian king, King Leopold III, had a Belgian second wife, Lilian, Princess of Réthy, who was not given the title of queen). Their eldest child, Princess Elisabeth, became heir apparent and is expected to become Belgium's first queen regnant.

== Activities ==
Queen Mathilde is involved with a range of social issues including education, child poverty, intergenerational poverty, the position of women in society and literacy.

Since 2009, Queen Mathilde has been the honorary president of Unicef Belgium. She serves as the World Health Organization's Special Representative for immunization. She also the honorary president of the Breast International Group, a non-profit organisation for academic breast cancer research groups from around the world.

She set up the Princess Mathilde Fund (now the Queen Mathilde Fund) in 2001, which promotes the care of vulnerable people and awards an annual prize for good works in a particular sector. The sector changes each year: examples include early years education, women's health, and protecting young people from violence.

Queen Mathilde deploys the Queen's Charities to offer help to citizens who are struggling to cope with financial hardship in their daily lives and often turn to her as a last resort. The Queen is the honorary president of Child Focus, a foundation for missing and sexually exploited children.

Queen Mathilde is also a patron of the Queen Elisabeth Music Competition, an international competition founded in 1937 as an initiative of Queen Elisabeth and Belgian composer and violist Eugène Ysaÿe.

In 2018, Queen Mathilde became the honorary president of the Federal Council for Sustainable Development. According to the royal tradition, Queen Mathilde became an honorary member of the Royal Academy of Medicine of Belgium.

Queen Mathilde is a member of the board of the Schwab Foundation for Social Entrepreneurship. She was a United Nations Emissary for the International Year of Microcredit 2005, which focused in particular on financial inclusion and financial literacy. The Queen also attends the annual World Economic Forum in Davos.

Queen Mathilde was named a United Nations Sustainable Development Goal Advocate in 2016, promoting the 17 Sustainable Development Goals (an agenda for global sustainable development).

The Queen also presided at the ceremony awarding the King Baudouin International Development Prize. She also received an Honorary Doctorate from Hasselt University on 30 May 2023.

== Honours ==
=== National ===
- Belgium: Grand Cordon of the Order of Leopold

=== Foreign ===
- Denmark: Knight of the Order of the Elephant, 2017.
- France: Grand Cross of the National Order of the Legion of Honour, 2018.
- Finland: Grand Cross of the Order of the White Rose of Finland
- Germany: Grand Cross Special Class of the Order of Merit of the Federal Republic of Germany
- Greece: Grand Cross of the Order of the Redeemer 2 May 2022
- Holy See:
  - Dame Grand Cross of the Equestrian Order of the Holy Sepulchre of Jerusalem
  - Dame of the Collar of the Equestrian Order of the Holy Sepulchre of Jerusalem 17 November 2015
- Italy: Knight Grand Cross of the Order of Merit of the Italian Republic 20 October 2025
- Japan: Grand Cordon of the Order of the Precious Crown
- Jordan: Grand Cordon with Brilliants of the Supreme Order of the Renaissance
- Lithuania: Grand Cross of the Order of Vytautas the Great 24 October 2022
- Luxembourg:
  - Knight of the Order of the Gold Lion of the House of Nassau, 2019.
  - Grand Cross of the Order of Civil and Military Merit of Adolph of Nassau
- Netherlands:
  - Knight Grand Cross of the Order of the Netherlands Lion, 2016.
  - Knight Grand Cross of the Order of Orange-Nassau
  - Recipient of the King Willem-Alexander Inauguration Medal
- Norway: Grand Cross of the Royal Norwegian Order of Saint Olav
- Oman: Member Special Class of the Order of Oman, 2024.
- Poland:
  - Knight of the Order of the White Eagle
  - Grand Cross of the Order of Merit of the Republic of Poland
- Portugal:
  - Grand Cross of the Military Order of Our Lord Jesus Christ, 2006.
  - Grand Collar of the Order of Prince Henry, 2018.
- Spain: Dame Grand Cross of the Royal Order of Isabella the Catholic 12 May 2000
- Sweden:
  - Member Grand Cross of the Royal Order of the Polar Star
  - Recipient of the 70th Birthday Badge Medal of King Carl XVI Gustaf

== Arms ==
Alliance coat of arms of King Philippe and Queen Mathilde	Dual cypher of King Philippe and Queen Mathilde of the Belgians	Coat of arms of the House of d'Udekem d'Acoz	Coat of arms of Mathilde d'Udekem d'Acoz

== Footnotes ==
Queen Mathilde of Belgium House of d'Udekem d'Acoz Born: 20 January 1973
Belgian royalty
Preceded by Paola Ruffo di Calabria	Queen consort of the Belgians; 2013–present	Incumbent
