= Queen Paola of Belgium =

Queen of the Belgians from 1993 to 2013

Paola Ruffo di Calabria
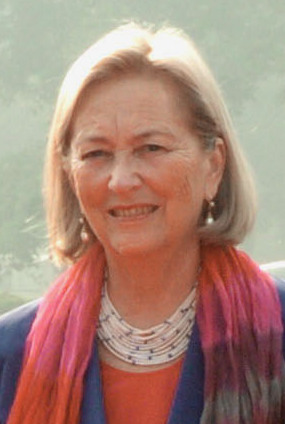
- Paola in 2008

Queen consort of the Belgians
- Tenure: 9 August 1993 – 21 July 2013
- Born: Donna Paola Margherita Maria-Antonia Consiglia Ruffo di Calabria (Note: Although The Belgian Monarchy website attributes the title of "Princess" to Queen Paola prior to marriage, Burke's Peerage 1973, The Descendants of Louis XIII 1999, Genealogisches Handbuch des Adels 2001, La Descendance de Marie-Thérèse de Habsburg 1996, and Le Petit Gotha 2002 among others, accord only the noble prefix of Donna to her and her sisters, reserving the title Principessa for the wife of the head of the family); 11 September 1937 (age 88); Villa Claudia, Forte dei Marmi, Italy
- Spouse: Albert II of Belgium (m. 1959)
- Issue: Philippe, King of the Belgians; Princess Astrid, Archduchess of Austria-Este; Prince Laurent
- House: Ruffo di Calabria
- Father: Fulco, Prince Ruffo di Calabria
- Mother: Luisa Gazelli dei Conti di Rossana

Paola Margherita Maria-Antonia Consiglia dei Principi Ruffo di Calabria (Note: In Belgium, women do not change their surname upon marriage.) (born 11 September 1937) is a member of the Belgian royal family who was Queen of the Belgians during the reign of her husband, King Albert II, from 9 August 1993 to 21 July 2013.

== Early life and family background ==
Donna Paola Margherita Maria-Antonia Consiglia Ruffo di Calabria was born in Forte dei Marmi, Tuscany, Kingdom of Italy, into Calabrian branch of the House of Ruffo, one of the oldest and most illustrious families of the Italian nobility.

She was the seventh and youngest child of Fulco, Prince Ruffo di Calabria, 6th Duke of Guardia Lombarda (1884–1946), who was a World War I Italian flying ace, and his wife, Donna Luisa Gazelli dei Conti di Rossana e di Sebastiano (1896–1989), who served as a lady-in-waiting to Queen Elena of Italy. Her mother is a matrilineal descendant of the Marquis de Lafayette, a hero of the American Revolution. Paola is predominantly of Italian and French noble ancestry, with a dash of Belgian, Dutch and German nobility in her veins. In her youth, she was hailed as one of the leading beauties of Europe.

Queen Paola is fluent in Italian, German, French and English. Less fluent, and the cause of occasional criticism, is her Dutch, the mother tongue of nearly 60 percent of Belgians.

== Marriage and family ==
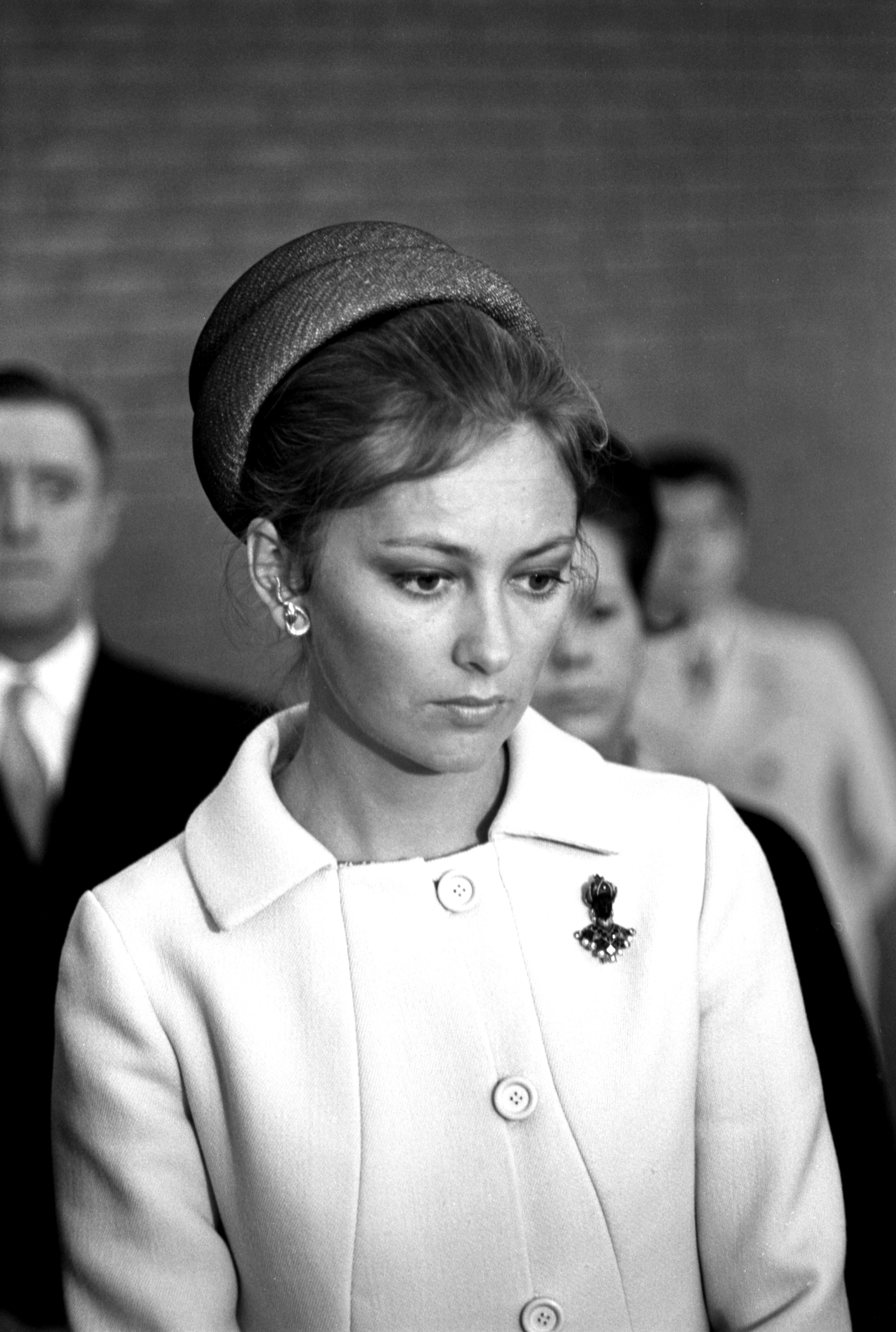
Paola in 1967

In 1958, the Prince of Liège went to the Vatican to witness the coronation of Pope John XXIII. At a reception at the Belgian embassy, the Prince met Italian Donna Paola Ruffo di Calabria. "We were both shy, so we only talked a little", Paola said later about their first meeting. Prince Albert later proposed marriage to Paola and she accepted. Their engagement was announced at the Palace of Laeken in 1959. The couple married at the Cathedral of St. Michael and St. Gudula in Brussels on 2 July 1959. They have three children together: King Philippe (born 15 April 1960), Princess Astrid (born 5 June 1962), and Prince Laurent (born 19 October 1963).

The couple's marriage was in trouble by the 1970s and Albert fathered a daughter by Baroness Sybille de Selys Longchamps, named Delphine. Despite starting divorce negotiations at the time, the couple remained married, and reconciled in the 1980s, celebrating it with a new symbolic wedding ceremony.

== Activities ==
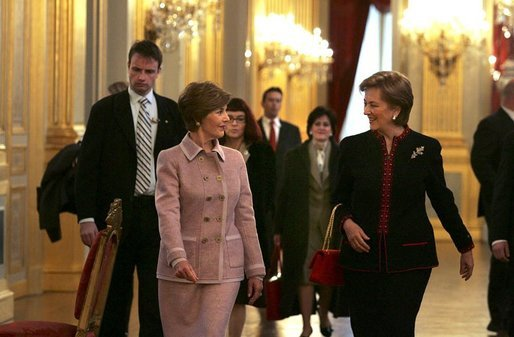
Queen Paola walks with Laura Bush during a tour of the Royal Palace of Brussels in February 2005.

Apart from her activities in the company of King Albert II, Paola devotes her time to social issues mainly in the social and cultural sphere.

The Queen has demonstrated interest in the contemporary Belgian arts, visiting Venetian Biennale several times. She has acquired works of Jan Fabre, Michael Borremans and others for the Royal collection. The Queen has often met with such artists as Luc Tuymans and Dirk Braeckman.

Paola takes a keen interest in the protection and preservation of Belgium's heritage. She makes numerous visits to cultural sites, from Beguine convents to early 19th century industrial facilities. Paola is interested in both traditional and contemporary crafts, and takes every opportunity to encourage the exercise and teaching of craft professions.

Paola keeps abreast of contemporary art and regularly supports major exhibitions and artistic performances both in Belgium and abroad. On her initiative, contemporary artists have had the opportunity to design and make original works within the Royal Palace of Brussels.

In 1992, Paola established the Queen Paola Foundation. The foundation focused on integration and training for young people. The foundation's activities are geared towards social integration, support for teachers at all levels of the education system and schools in socio-economically disadvantaged areas.

Paola is an honorary chairman of the Queen Elisabeth Music Chapel and Missing Children Europe.

== Health ==
In 2015, the court announced Queen Paola was taking "a period of total rest" following doctors' orders. They also announced that she had to cancel a planned visit to the Biennale in Venice. Further communications were kept private. Paola sent a message to Grosio, where she was expected to visit the residence of her aunt the Marchioness Margherita Pallavicini Mossi. Newspapers believed that the Queen suffered a stroke during the holiday. The palace later announced she was being treated for a cardiac arrhythmia.

In 2016, Paola fractured a vertebra and in the following year she suffered from a fractured femoral neck and broke her hip. In September 2018, her visit to Venice was cut short and she was flown to a hospital in Belgium due to what was described by the palace as a "health problem", though some outlets speculated that she had suffered a stroke.

In March 2022, Paola was ordered to rest for two months after breaking her arm in a fall.

== Titles, styles, honours and arms ==
=== Titles and styles ===
- 11 September 1937 – 2 July 1959: Donna Paola Ruffo di Calabria (Note: Although The Belgian Monarchy website attributes the title of "Princess" to Queen Paola prior to her marriage, Burke's Guide to the Royal Family, The Descendants of Louis XIII, Genealogisches Handbuch des Adels, La Descendance de Marie-Thérèse de Habsburg and Le Petit Gotha, among others, accord only the noble prefix of Donna to her and her sisters, reserving the title Principessa for the wife of the head of the family, Paola's father having received the title of prince in the Italian nobility in 1928 from King Victor Emmanuel III, heritable according to masculine primogeniture.)
- 2 July 1959 – 9 August 1993: Her Royal Highness The Princess of Liège
- 9 August 1993 – 21 July 2013: Her Majesty The Queen of the Belgians
- 21 July 2013 – present: Her Majesty Queen Paola of Belgium

=== Honours ===
==== National ====
- Italy: Grand Cross of the Order of Merit of the Italian Republic

==== Foreign ====
- Austria: Grand Cross, 1st Class of the Order of Honour for Services to the Republic of Austria
- Bulgaria: Grand Cross of the Order of the Balkan Mountains
- Denmark: Knight of the Order of the Elephant
- Estonia: Grand Cross of the Order of the Cross of Terra Mariana
- Latvia: Grand Cross of the Order of the Three Stars
- Lithuania: Grand Cross of the Order of Vytautas the Great
- Poland: Grand Cross of the Order of the White Eagle
- Portugal: Grand Cross of the Order of Christ
- Romania: Grand Cross of the Order of the Star of Romania
- Spain: Dame Grand Cross of the Order of Charles III

=== Arms ===
Alliance Coat of Arms of King Albert II and Queen Paola of the Belgians	Alliance Coat of Arms of former King Albert and Queen Paola of Belgium; Since 2019	Royal Monogram of Queen Paola of Belgium	Dual Cypher of King Albert II and Queen Paola of the Belgians

== See also ==
- Queen Paola Foundation
- The Queen's Charities

== Footnotes ==
Queen Paola of Belgium House of Ruffo di Calabria Born: 11 September 1937
Belgian royalty
Preceded by Fabiola de Mora y Aragón	Queen consort of the Belgians; 1993–2013	Succeeded by Mathilde d'Udekem d'Acoz
