= List of rulers of the Tangier International Zone =

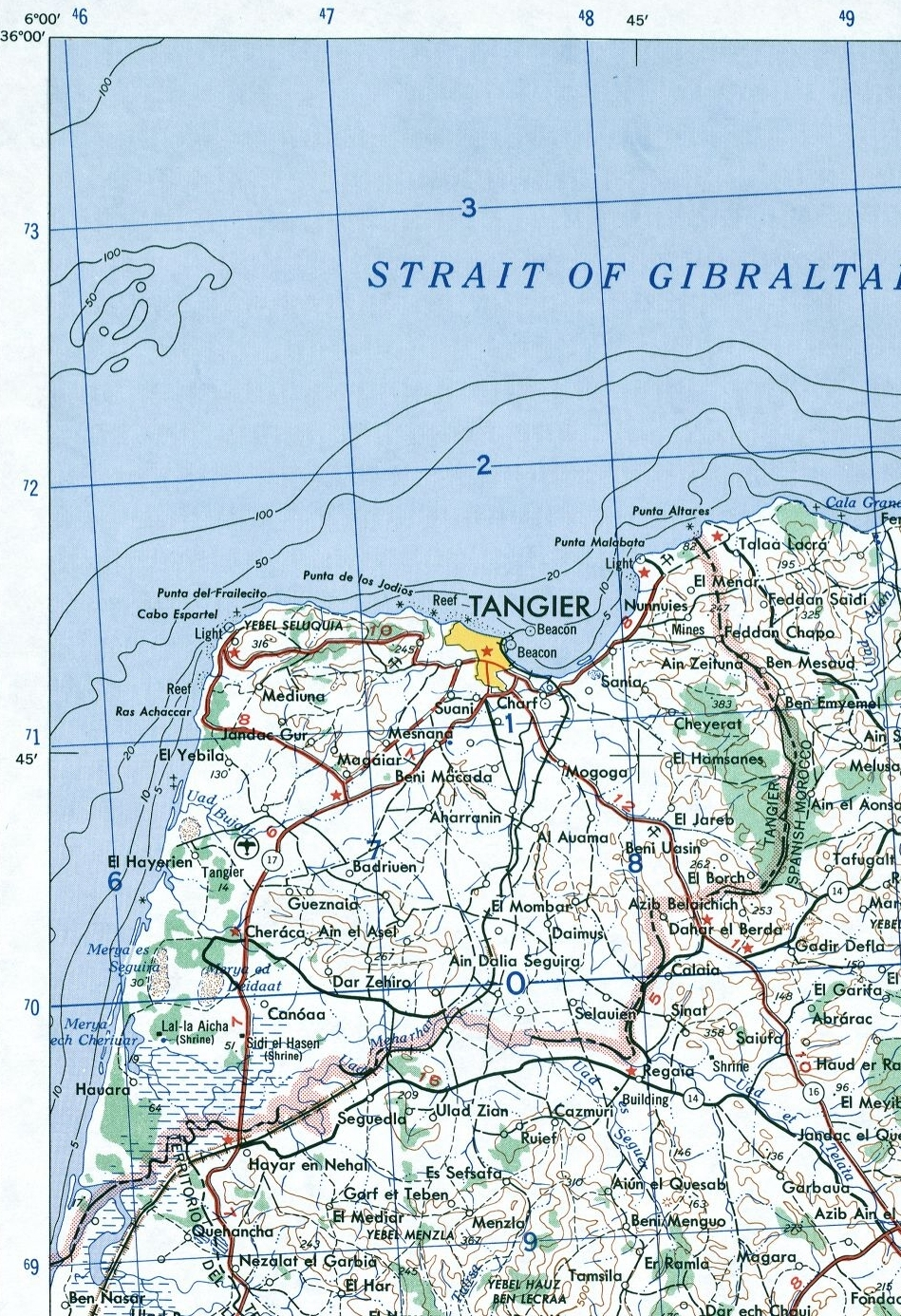
Tangier (yellow) and the International Zone, 1953.

Merchant flag of the Tangier International Zone.

This is a list of Administrators (with executive authority over the territory and its European populations) and Mendoubs (representatives of the Sultan of Morocco, with authority over the Muslim and Jewish communities) of the Tangier International Zone.

== Administrators ==
(Dates in italics indicate de facto continuation of office)

Tenure	Portrait	Incumbent	Country
1912	International Protectorate of Britain, France and Spain (later Portugal, Italy, Belgium, Netherlands, Sweden, and the United States) attached to French Morocco.		
1923	International Administration under the Tangier Protocol		
1926 to 19 August 1929		Paul Alberge, Administrator	France
19 August 1929 to 14 June 1940		Pierre Le Fur, Administrator	France
14 June 1940	Spanish occupation		
14 June 1940 to 1 August 1940		Pierre Le Fur, Administrator	France
1 August 1940 to 4 November 1940		Manuel Amieva Escandón, Administrator	Spain
14 June 1940 to 4 November 1940		Antonio Yuste Segura, Military Governor	Spain
4 November 1940	Incorporated into Spanish Morocco		
4 November 1940 to March 1941		Antonio Yuste Segura, Governor-General	Spain
1941 to 18 November 1942		Genaro Uriarte Arriola, Governor-General	Spain
18 November 1942 to 11 October 1945		Juan Potous y Martínez, Governor-General	Spain
11 October 1945	Joint Administration of Great Britain, France, Spain, Portugal, Italy, Belgium, Netherlands, Sweden and the United States		
11 October 1945 to 18 June 1948		Luís Magalhães Correia, Administrator	Portugal
August 1948 to 9 April 1951		Jonkheer Hendrik Frederik Lodewijk Karel van Vredenburch, Administrator	Netherlands
9 April 1951 to 21 June 1954		José Luís Archer, Administrator	Portugal
21 June 1954 to December 1954		Étienne de Croÿ, prince de Croÿ-Roeulx, Administrator	Belgium
4 January 1955 to 5 July 1956		Robert van de Kerckhove d'Hallebast, Administrator	Belgium

== Mendoubs ==
Tenure	Incumbent	Country
1923 to 16 March 1941	Muhammad at-Tazi Bu Ashran, Representative of the Sultan and President of the Legislative Assembly (1st Term)	Morocco
16 March 1941 to October 1945	vacant	
October 1945 to 1954	Muhammad at-Tazi Bu Ashran, Representative of the Sultan and President of the Legislative Assembly (2nd Term)	Morocco
1954 to 8 July 1956	Ahmad at-Tazi, Representative of the Sultan and President of the Legislative Assembly	Morocco
8 July 1956	Re-incorporated into Morocco	

== See also ==
- Tangier International Zone
- Mendoubia
