= Selys Longchamps =

Coat of arms of Sélys-Longchamps family

Selys Longchamps is a Belgian baronial noble family.

== History ==
In 1656, Michel de Selys, former mayor of Liège, received at the same time as his brothers Hubert and Godefroid, a nobiliary title from Ferdinand III, Holy Roman Emperor. His grandson, Walter de Selys, received in 1699 from Leopold I, Holy Roman Emperor the title of Baron of the Holy Roman Empire, transferable to all legitimate male or female descendants.

== Notable members ==
- Edmond de Selys Longchamps, zoologist
- Sybille de Selys Longchamps, aristocrat, mother of Princess Delphine of Belgium
- Jean de Selys Longchamps, aviator
