= Édouard Vermeulen =

Belgian fashion designer (born 1957)

Édouard, baron Vermeulen (born 4 March 1957 in Ypres, West Flanders, Belgium) is a Belgian fashion designer. He is known for dressing members of the royal families of Belgium, the Netherlands and Luxembourg. He runs his own fashion label, NATAN, and has a boutique in Brussels.

Vermeulen designed the wedding dresses for the following:

- Princess Laurentien of the Netherlands
- Queen Mathilde of Belgium
- Princess Claire of Belgium

In 2007, Vermeulen was a judge of the Young Belgian Designers awards. In 2012, Grand Duchess Maria Teresa, Princess Alexandra and Princess Tessy of Luxembourg were all dressed by Vermeulen for the wedding of Guillaume, Hereditary Grand Duke of Luxembourg.

In 2013, the now Queen Maxima wore NATAN to Queen Beatrix's abdication. The Princess of Orange and her sisters wore NATAN to the inauguration of King Willem-Alexander. In 2017, Vermeulen received the title of baron from King Philippe of Belgium.
