= Prince of Liège =

Position of Belgian nobility

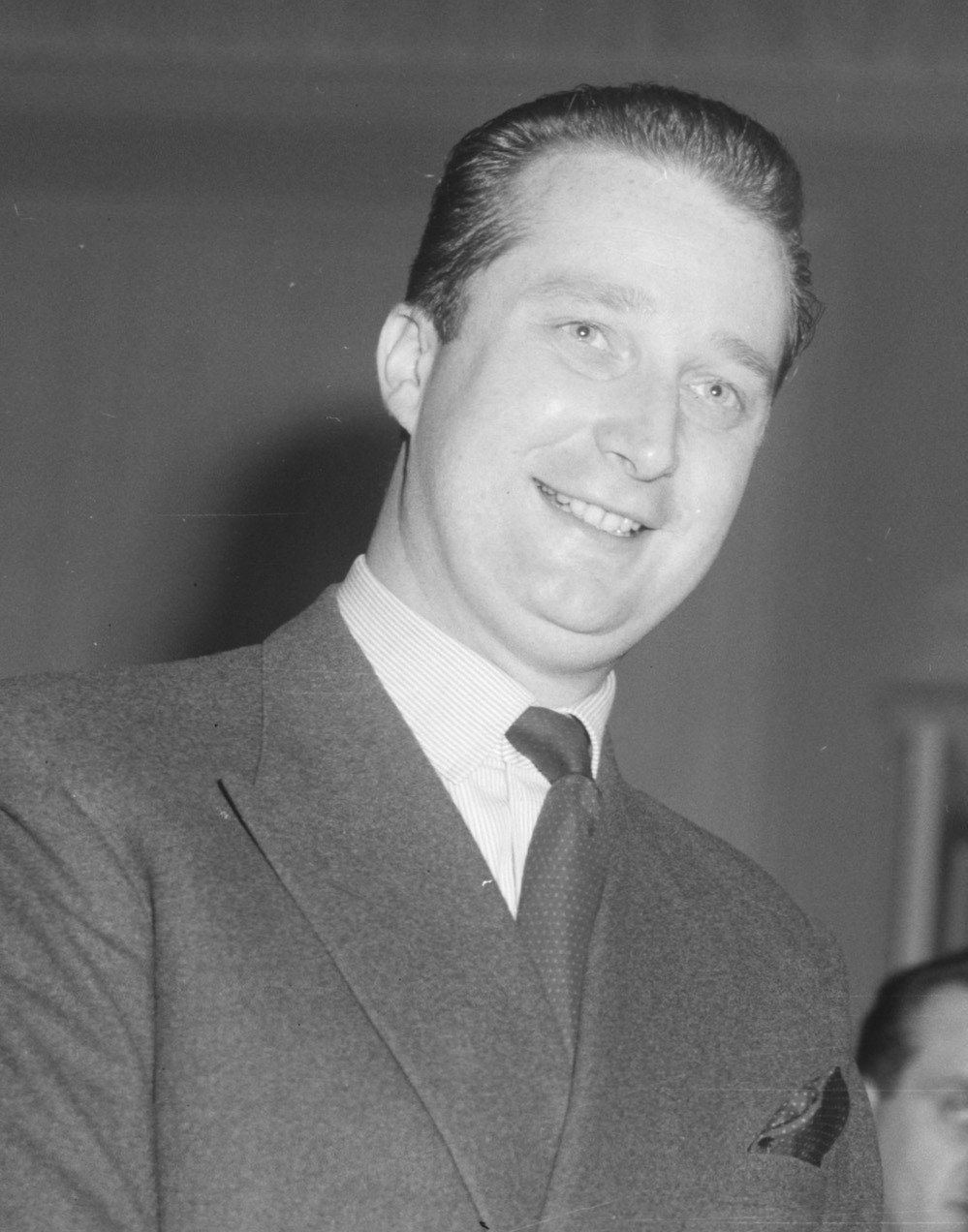
Photograph of Prince Albert, the Prince of Liège at the time, in 1964.

Prince of Liège (French: Prince de Liège, Dutch: Prins van Luik, German: Prinz von Lüttich) is a substantive title awarded by King Leopold III of the Belgians to his younger son, Prince Albert (the future King Albert II), while he was second in line to the throne of Belgium on June 7, 1934. The title was used from that date until his accession as the sixth King of the Belgians on 9 August 1993. His wife, the former Queen Paola, was known as the Princess of Liège from their marriage in 1959 until their accession in 1993.

Albert's elder brother Prince Baudouin (the future King Baudouin) was known as the Duke of Brabant at the time of Albert's birth. The title Count of Hainaut was traditionally reserved for the eldest son of the crown prince and King Leopold's brother held the title of Count of Flanders. This meant that all the commonly used titles in the Belgian Royal Household had been given, so a new style–Prince of Liége–had to be created. The city of Liège was seen as deserving this honour for its strong resistance against German occupation during the First World War.

King Albert II decided in 2001 to no longer award substantive titles such as Count of Flanders, Count of Hainaut, and Prince of Liège. The heir to the throne is awarded the title Duke or Duchess of Brabant. It is currently held by Princess Elisabeth, Duchess of Brabant. It is therefore likely that Albert II will be the only Prince of Liège.

Map of the Principality of Liège around 1350.

The title is reminiscent of the Prince-Bishopric of Liège, a noble title of the Holy Roman Empire, which had existed for approximately eight centuries. That title ceased to exist in 1795. The Prince-Bishopric of Liège or Principality of Liège was a Roman Catholic ecclesiastical principality of the Holy Roman Empire that was situated for the most part in present-day Belgium. It was an Imperial Estate, so the bishop of Liège, as its prince, had a seat and a vote in the Imperial Diet. The Prince-Bishopric of Liège should not be confused with the Diocese of Liège, which was larger and over which the prince-bishop exercised only the usual responsibilities of a bishop.

== Princes of Liège (Kingdom of Belgium) ==
- Albert (1934–1993)
