= Queen Paola Foundation =

Belgian non-profit organization

The Queen Paola Foundation, founded in December 1992, is a Belgian non-profit organization. The foundation was created at the request of Princess Paola of Belgium. The aim of the foundation is to provide support to Belgian organizations which help young people facing problems with re-integration into society, and to support education. The foundation has established the School of Hope programme, in order to support schools located in disadvantaged neighbourhoods.

== Queen Paola prize ==
The Queen Paola prize was created in 1997 to recognize primary school teachers. Since 1998, the prize is awarded annually, alternating between primary and secondary school teachers.

== Merger ==
In 2025, the Queen Paola Foundation merged the Pelicano Foundation, a Belgian charity founded in 2008 that specialized in combating child poverty. The Pelicano name was retained as a program within the merged organization.

== See also ==
- King Baudouin Foundation
- Prince Albert Fund
- The Queen's Charities
