= Jean-Joseph Chapuis =

- Born: June 6, 1765; Brussels, Austrian Netherlands (present-day Belgium)
- Died: February 10, 1864 (aged 98); Brussels, Belgium
- Occupations: Cabinetmaker and Furniture trader

Signature
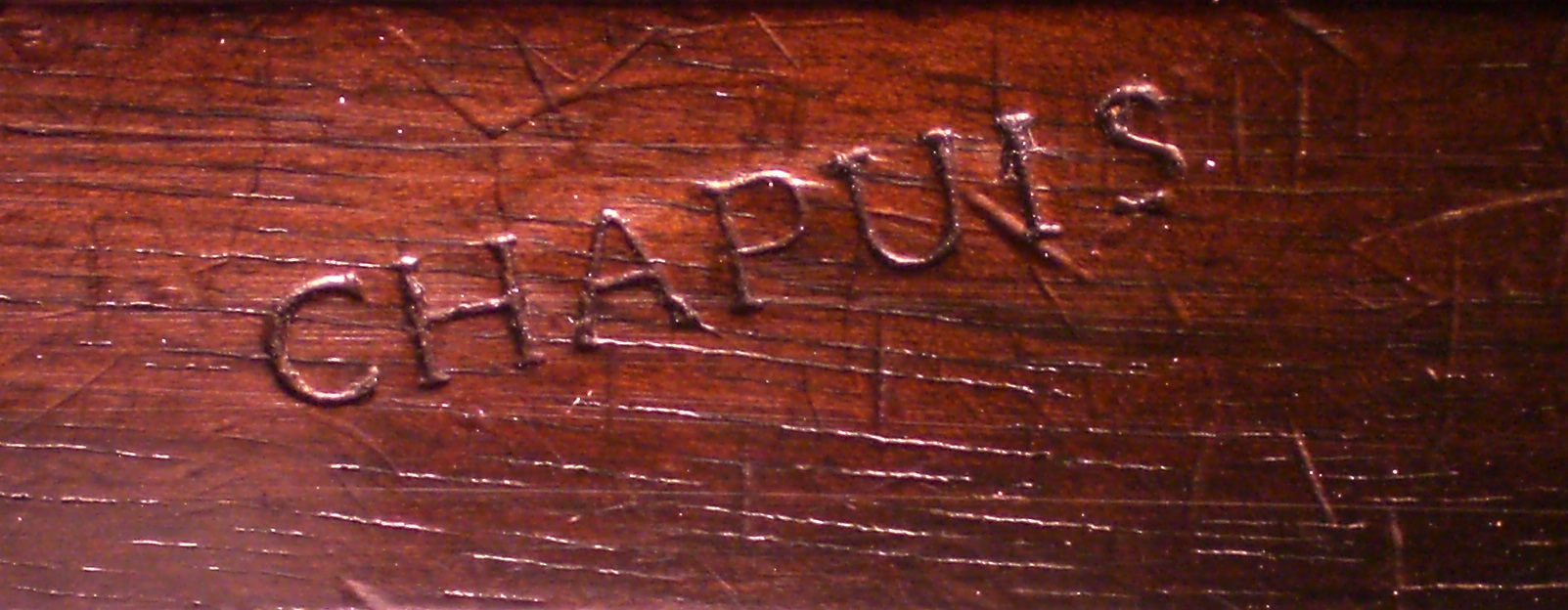

Jean-Joseph Chapuis (June 6, 1765 – February 10, 1864) was a French cabinetmaker of the 18th and 19th centuries.

== Biography ==
Jean-Joseph Chapuis was born in Brussels in 1765. He was trained in Paris, where he became a master craftsman, entitling him to use a personal mark (estampille) on his work. He had set up his workshop in his home town by 1795 and kept it active to 1830, regularly applying his mark on the pieces of furniture that he made. When the first reference guides on the history of French furniture in the 18th century appeared in Paris, this mark was attributed to Claude Chapuis, who was in fact only a simple trader, of whom little if anything is known. This deprived Jean-Joseph Chapuis of his fame and explains why pieces of furniture by Jean-Joseph Chapuis are rarely found in public collections outside France. The museum of Vleeshuis in Antwerp is an exception. Only single pieces made by Chapuis, not collections, have ever been found, so it is impossible to give a precise account of everything he produced during his lifetime. The museum of Saint-Josse-ten-Noode, Brussels, Belgium, is the only one to possess several marked pieces of Chapuis's furniture. They were collected by Joseph Adolph Van Cutsem, a collector of Empire furniture, who in 1865 supplemented his collection with two significant purchases made during Chapuis's funeral sale. However, these pieces do not reflect the full range of styles used by this cabinetmaker.

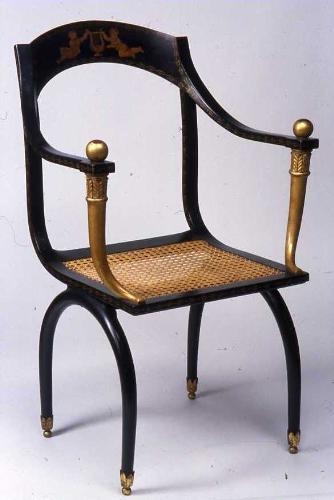
A Chapuis chair

== Creative work ==
For a long time, the Belgian Musées royaux d'Art et d'Histoire had only a single piece of furniture stamped by Chapuis, a commode chair bequeathed to the Belgian State by Isabel and Helen Godtschalck in 1915. In the 18th century, as today, there were various euphemisms for this type of chair, such as chaise de commodité (commodity chair), chaise d'aisances (facilities chair), and chaise d'affaire (business chair). This class of furniture was usually made by carpenters rather than cabinetmakers. In 1805, Chapuis was charged with an appraisal of the furnishings of the royal castle of Laeken. In his appraisal, Chapuis called it a chaise de garde (caregiver's chair), a rare term also occurring in the estate inventory of the Empress Josephine at the Château de Malmaison. Both uses refer to an annex to the bedroom, found only in wealthy residences, in which there is specific furniture.
