= Queen Mathilde Fund =

Belgian foundation

The Queen Mathilde Fund (from 2001 to 2013 Princess Mathilde Fund) is a Belgian foundation named after Queen Mathilde of Belgium. The fund was created from the donations the queen received on her wedding with then-Prince Philippe and is aimed towards the most vulnerable people in Belgian society.

== Queen Mathilde Prize ==
Since 2001 the Queen Mathilde Prize is awarded annually to support special initiatives that seek to strengthen the position of people and groups in Belgium who are socially more vulnerable.

== See also ==
- Fabiola of Belgium
- King Baudouin Foundation

== Sources ==
- monarchie.be
