= Princess Delphine of Belgium =

Belgian artist and royal (born 1968)

Princess Delphine
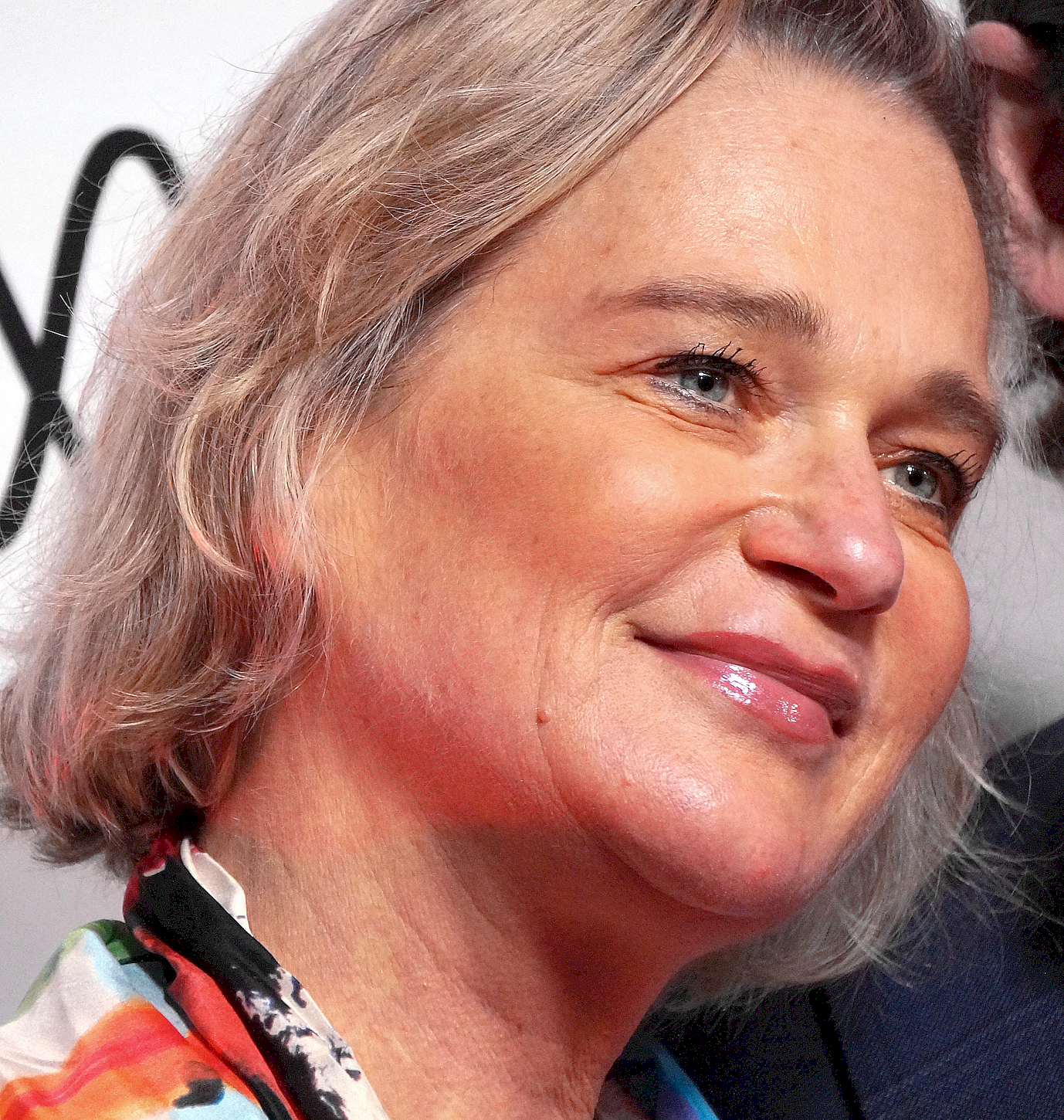
- Princess Delphine in 2024
- Born: Jonkvrouw Delphine Boël; 22 February 1968 (age 58); Uccle, Brussels, Belgium
- Spouse: James O'Hare
- Issue: Princess Joséphine; Prince Oscar
Names
- French: Delphine Michèle Anne Marie Ghislaine de Saxe-Cobourg; Dutch: Delphine Michelle Anna Maria Gisela van Saksen-Coburg
- House: Belgium
- Father: Albert II of Belgium
- Mother: Sybille de Selys Longchamps

Princess Delphine of Belgium (Delphine Michèle Anne Marie Ghislaine de Saxe-Cobourg; born 22 February 1968), known previously as Jonkvrouw Delphine Boël, is a Belgian artist and member of the Belgian royal family. She is the daughter of King Albert II of Belgium with Baroness Sybille de Selys Longchamps, and the half-sister of King Philippe of Belgium. On 1 October 2020, she was lawfully recognised as Princess of Belgium with the style "Her Royal Highness". Earlier, she had belonged to the Belgian titled nobility and was legally Jonkvrouw.

== Early life and career ==
Princess Delphine is the daughter of Baroness Sybille de Selys Longchamps, whose first husband was a Belgian nobleman and industrialist Jonkheer Jacques Boël. They divorced in 1978. Her biological father is Albert II, former King of the Belgians.

Delphine attended boarding school in England and Switzerland, and studied at the Chelsea School of Art and Design in London, where she earned a Bachelor of Arts in fine arts (with honours) in 1990. She has been a guest lecturer at the Higher Institute for Fine Arts (HISK), Antwerp, and the Maastricht Art School.

She is the founding patron of the Princess Delphine of Saxe-Coburg Fund based at Ghent University Hospital, promoting the use of art in health care. The Belgian brewery Struise produced a "Cuvée Delphine" beer for which she designed the artwork for the bottle label. Her sculpture Ageless Love is in the Gerdapark, Sint-Niklaas. In 2021, she designed the decoration of the Lamborghini Art Car.

== Personal life ==
She is married to James O'Hare, an American businessman. The couple have two children:

- Her Royal Highness Princess Joséphine O'Hare de Saxe-Cobourg, Princess of Belgium (born 17 October 2003). Princess Joséphine attended the Notre-Dame des Champs School, a French language school in Uccle, Brussels. In 2022, she enrolled in the Liberal Arts and Sciences course in an unnamed university in the Netherlands. She speaks French and English.
- His Royal Highness Prince Oscar John Patrick Tobias Léopold Michel O'Hare de Saxe-Cobourg, Prince of Belgium (born 28 April 2008). Prince Oscar attends school in Brussels.

== Paternity case ==
On 19 October 1999, an 18-year-old Flemish schoolboy, Mario Danneels, published his unauthorized biography of Queen Paola, Paola, van 'la dolce vita' tot koningin ("Paola, from 'la dolce vita' to Queen"). The book contained a statement referring to the existence of a daughter born out of wedlock to King Albert. The Belgian press investigated, and traced Delphine. At first, both Boël and her mother refused to comment on the matter, and the palace dismissed Danneels's book as gossip and rumor.

The press interpreted a short passage in the king's 1999 Christmas speech as acknowledgement of his 18-year-long relationship with Baroness Sybille de Selys Longchamps.

Boël gave an interview on 15 May 2005, to the France 3 presenter Marc-Olivier Fogiel in the broadcast On ne peut pas plaire à tout le monde ('"You Can't Please Everyone") in which she alleged for the first time that she was King Albert's daughter. She claimed that when she and her mother moved to England, when she was 9, Albert (not yet king) wished to divorce his wife and join them. Her mother apparently opposed this because of the political consequences for Albert. She said her mother told her the truth about her parentage when she turned 17. In later interviews, Boël said she made a telephone call to Albert when she was 33 years old asking for help. According to her statement, he replied: "Never call me again. You are not my daughter," which she said was hurtful. Boël added that her efforts to contact her father via telephone and sending letters or through friends and politicians failed.

In June 2013, right before King Albert lost his immunity to prosecution, Boël summoned him and his children Prince Philippe and Princess Astrid to appear in court. She hoped to use DNA tests to prove that she was the king's daughter. As king, Albert was immune under the law, and Delphine decided to summon her half-siblings too. When the king abdicated on 21 July 2013 his immunity ceased, and Boël relaunched proceedings against him. In March 2017, the court ruled that her claim was unfounded, and her lawyers said she would take the claim to appeal.

On 5 November 2018, a court ruling was published which instructed Albert to submit to a DNA test to determine whether he was Boël's biological father. DNA testing is not obligatory in Belgium, but not submitting to it is considered evidence of paternity. In January 2019, Albert appealed in cassation against the verdict, but on 16 May of the same year, the Brussels's Court of Appeals ordered the former king to pay a fine of 5,000 euros a day to Boël for every day he refused to take a DNA test.

On 27 January 2020, the DNA tests showed that King Albert II was the father of Delphine Boël. In October 2020, she and her children were granted princely titles by the Belgian court of appeals. As she was born out of wedlock, Princess Delphine and her descendants are not in the line of succession to the Belgian throne. Although court costs totalling €3.4m were awarded to her on a substantial indemnity basis, she was not granted a royal endowment.

She and her half-brother King Philippe of Belgium met on 9 October 2020 at the Palace of Laeken. The next day, King Albert II reacted in a press release, rejoicing over the meeting and stating: "My wife and I are very happy by the initiative of the King, presage of happier days for all and in particular for Delphine."

On 25 October 2020, she was received at Belvédère Castle by her father and his wife, Queen Paola. On the occasion of the Belgian National Day on 21 July 2021, she and her partner joined the royal family at the military parade for the first time.

== Titles and styles ==
Delphine and her children have been granted the titles of prince and princess of Belgium with the style of Royal Highness following a court decision of 1 October 2020. Earlier, she had been styled as Jonkvrouw Delphine Boël.

== Arms ==
Coat of arms of Princess Delphine of Belgium
Notes As a Princess of Belgium and a descendant of King Leopold I, the Princess is entitled to use a coat of arms. Coats of arms used by the Belgian royal family are stipulated in the Royal Decree of King Philippe in 2019. Adopted 1 October 2020 Coronet Princely crown of Belgium Escutcheon On a lozenge, sable, a lion rampant or, armed and langued gules (Belgium), on the shoulder an escutcheon barry of ten sable and or, a crancelin vert (Wettin), overall a bordure or. Supporters Two lions guardant proper Motto French: L'union fait la force Dutch: Eendracht maakt macht German: Einigkeit macht stark Other elements The whole is placed on a mantle purpure with ermine lining, fringes and tassels or and ensigned with the Royal crown of Belgium.

== Published works ==
- Boël, Delphine (8 April 2008). Couper le cordon [Cut the Cord] (in French). Paris: Éditions Luc Pire. ISBN 9782507000684.
- Boël, Delphine (17 February 2017). Never Give Up (in French). Brussels: Marque Belge. ISBN 9782390150121.

== Filmography ==
- Delphine: My Story (2022)
