= Sybille de Selys Longchamps =

Belgian noblewoman (born 1941)

- Born: Baroness Sybille Michèle Emilie Marie Ghislaine de Selys Longchamps; 28 August 1941 (age 83); Uccle, Belgium
- Spouses: Jonkheer Jacques Boël (m. 1962; div. 1978) Hon. Michael Anthony Rathborne Cayzer (m. 1982; died 1990)
- Children: Princess Delphine of Belgium
- Parents: Count Michel François de Selys Longchamps (father); Countess Pauline Julie Cornet de Ways-Ruart (mother)

Baroness Sybille de Selys Longchamps (born 28 August 1941) is a Belgian noblewoman. She is the former mistress of King Albert II, with whom she has a daughter, Princess Delphine.

Born in Uccle, De Selys Longchamps was the daughter of Count Michel François de Selys Longchamps and Countess Pauline Julie Cornet de Ways-Ruart. In 1962, she married industrialist and steel magnate, Jonkheer Jacques Boël (1929–2022), nephew of Count René Boël. They divorced in 1978. In 1982, de Selys Longchamps married The Honourable Michael Anthony Rathborne Cayzer (1929–1990), son of shipping tycoon Herbert Cayzer, 1st Baron Rotherwick.

In 1968, De Selys Longchamps gave birth to daughter Delphine Boël while engaged in an extra-marital relationship with Prince Albert (later King) of Belgium. In 2013, the Baroness granted an interview with Belgian network VIER in a television special entitled, 'Onze dochter heet Delphine' (Our Daughter is Called Delphine). The Baroness told the interviewer that she and the Prince took no precautions in their affair, as she thought she was unable to become pregnant. Delphine was born in 1968 as a Boël. She was not formally recognized as King Albert's daughter until 2021.

De Selys Longchamps moved to London in 1976 where she lived with her second husband at his rural estate. She now maintains homes in Brussels and Provence.
