= The Queen's Charities (Belgium) =

Belgian foundation

The Queen's Charities (Dutch: Hulpfonds van de Koningin; French: Oeuvres de la Reine) is an organization intended to help the Queen of the Belgians in her philanthropic and social activities. In order to support the Queen, it collects information for her, and allocates the funds according to her instructions. When the Queen has a particular interest in an institution, the charity can participate in the creation or development of those institutions.

== Objectives ==
1. Aid to the needy and persons in cases of urgent necessity.
2. Aid to social projects in which the Queen is particularly interested.

== See also ==
- King Baudouin Foundation
- Queen Paola Foundation

== Sources ==
- The Queen's Charities
