= Palace of Laeken =

Belgian royal residence in Brussels

- Château de Laeken (French); Kasteel van Laken (Dutch); Schloss zu Laeken (German)
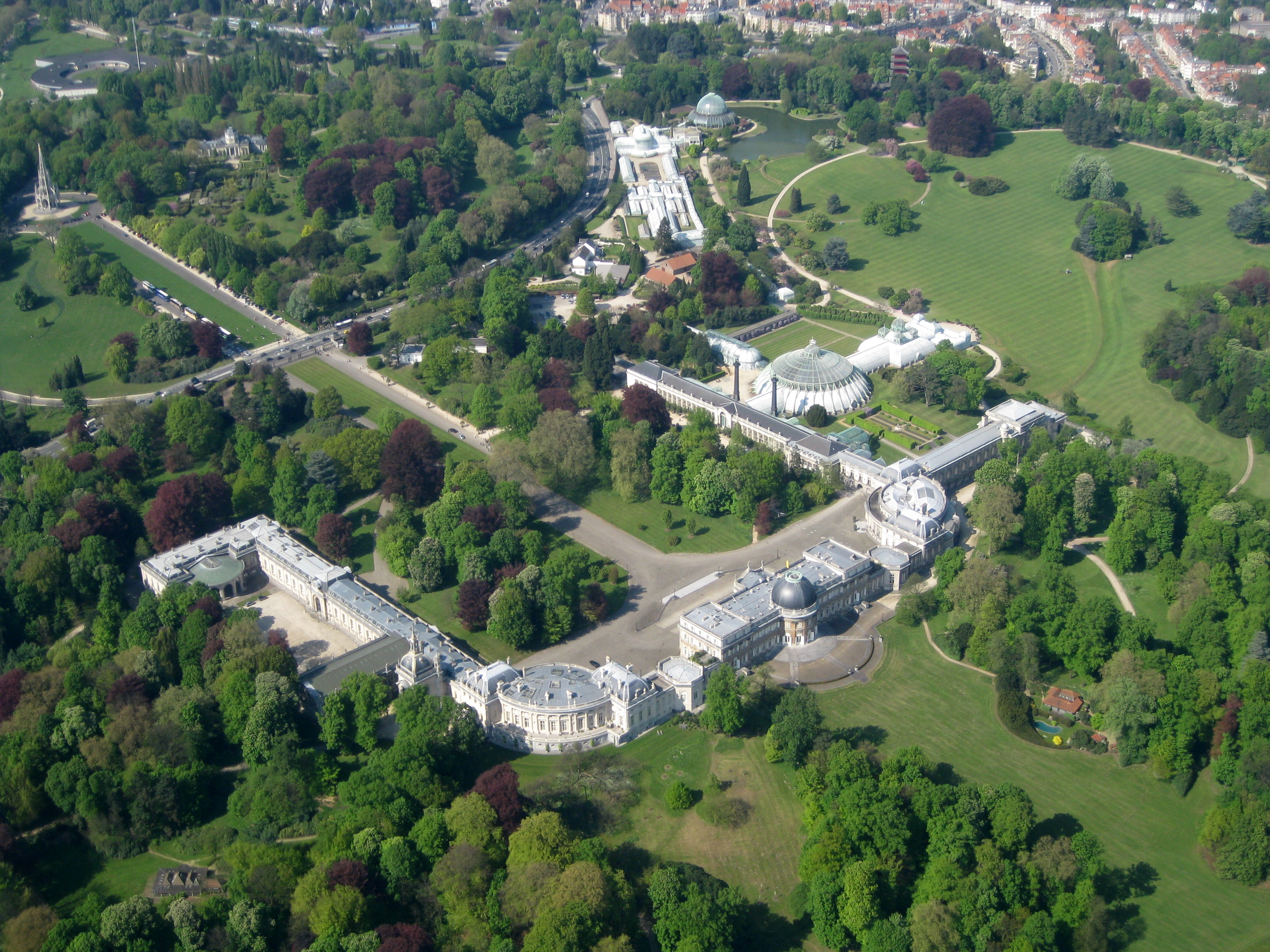
- The Palace of Laeken and park from the air
- Interactive map of the Palace of Laeken area
- Former names: Palace of Schonenberg
- Alternative names: Castle of Laeken

General information
- Type: Palace
- Architectural style: Neoclassical; Neo-Palladian
- Location: Avenue du Parc Royal / Koninklijk Parklaan, 1020 Laeken, City of Brussels, Brussels-Capital Region, Belgium
- Coordinates: 50°53′11″N 4°21′35″E
- Current tenants: Belgian royal family
- Construction started: 1782
- Completed: 1909
- Client: Duchess Maria Christina of Austria and Prince Albrecht of Saxony-Teschen
- Owner: Belgian state

Design and construction
- Architect: Charles de Wailly
- Structural engineer: Louis Montoyer

Other information
- Public transit: 6 Stuyvenbergh

Website
- www.monarchie.be/en

The Palace of Laeken or Castle of Laeken (French: Château de Laeken; Dutch: Kasteel van Laken; German: Schloss zu Laeken) is the official residence of the King and Queen of the Belgians and the Belgian royal family. It lies in the Brussels-Capital Region, 5 km (3 mi) north of the city centre, in Laeken (part of the City of Brussels), and sits in a large private park called the Royal Domain of Laeken.

The palace was built between 1782 and 1784 for the Governors of the Habsburg Netherlands, and was originally named the Palace of Schonenberg. It was partly destroyed by fire in 1890, after which it was rebuilt and extended. Significant modifications were undertaken at the beginning of the 20th century during the reign of King Leopold II. Nowadays, it is often referred to as the Royal Palace of Laeken or Royal Castle of Laeken.

The Palace of Laeken should not be confused with the Royal Palace of Brussels, in central Brussels, which is the official palace (not residence) of the King of the Belgians and from which state affairs are handled.

== History ==
=== Origins (c. 1782–1830) ===
The palace was built between 1782 and 1784 in Laeken, then a rural village outside Brussels, after the plans of the French architect and urbanist Charles de Wailly, under supervision of the Belgian-Austrian architect Louis Montoyer. It was originally named the Palace of Schonenberg (French: Château de Schonenberg, Dutch: Kasteel van Schonenberg) and was to serve as a summer residence for the Governors of the Habsburg Netherlands, Maria Christina, Duchess of Teschen and her husband Albert Casimir, Duke of Teschen. The French cabinetmaker Jean-Joseph Chapuis provided the royal furniture.

On 21 July 1803, Nicolas-Jean Rouppe, the commissioner of the department of the Dyle, received Napoleon at the Palace of Laeken. Napoleon stayed there with the Empress Joséphine in August 1804 on his way from awarding the first Légion d'honneur to his troops at Boulogne, to his progress along the Rhine, and later, during the Hundred Days in 1815, prematurely drafted a proclamation to be made from the palace:

To the Belgians and the inhabitants of the left bank of the Rhine. The ephemeral success of my enemies detached you for a moment from my empire. In my exile, upon a rock in the sea, I heard your complaint; the God of Battles has decided the fate of your beautiful provinces; Napoleon is among you; you are worthy to be Frenchmen. Rise in a body; join my invincible phalanxes to exterminate the remainder of these barbarians, who are your enemies and mine: they fly with rage and despair in their hearts.

— The Imperial Palace of Lacken, 17 June 1815. (Signed) Napoleon, The Imperial Palace of Lacken, 17 June 1815. By the Emperor, The Major-General of the Army, Count Bertrand."

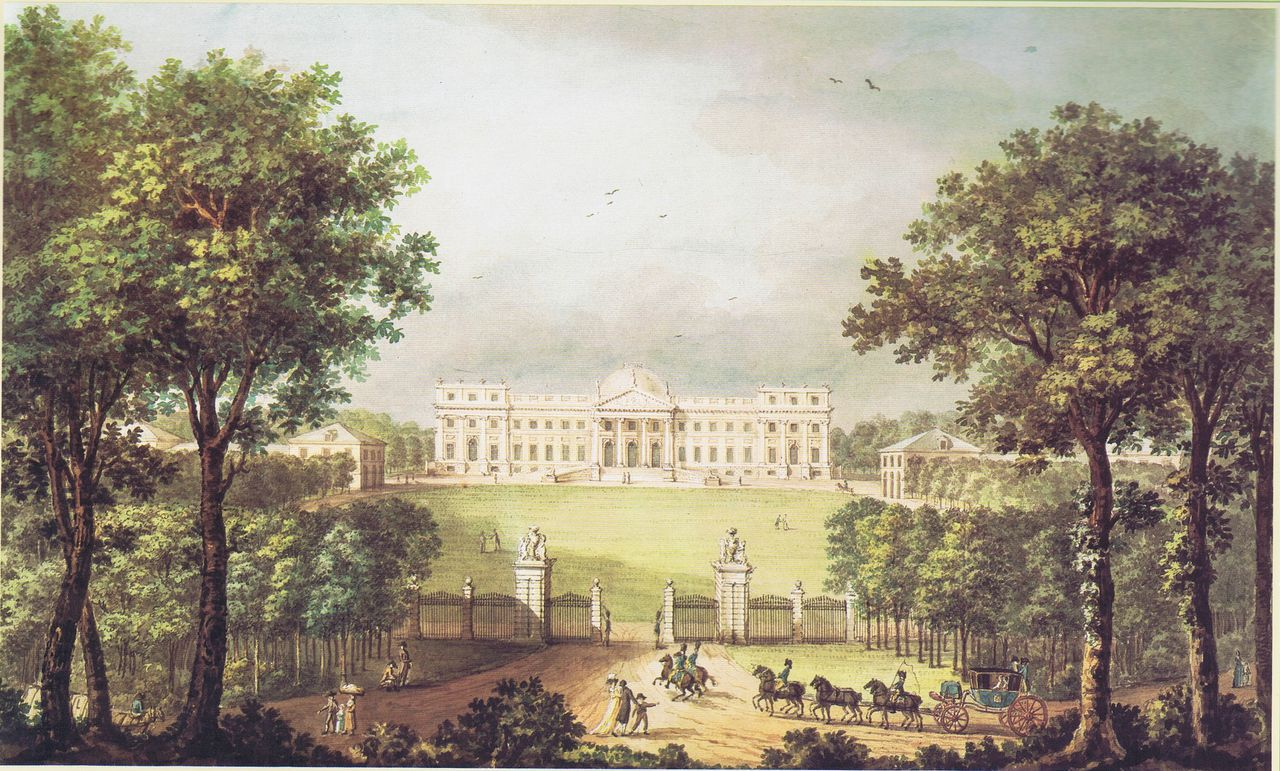
The Palace of Schonenberg in the 18th century

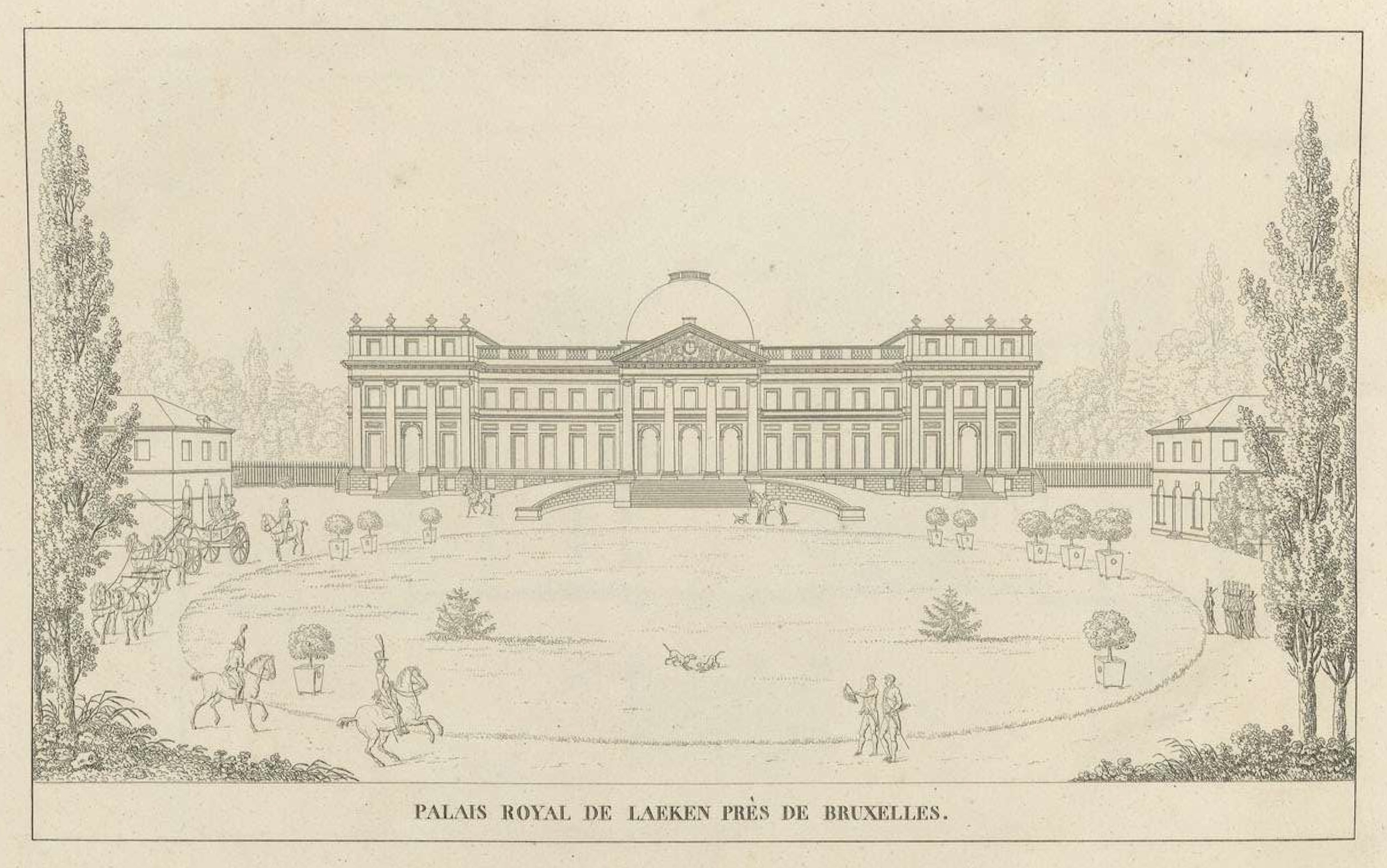
Engraving of the Palace of Laeken, from Pierre-Jacques Goetghebuer's Choix des monuments (1827)

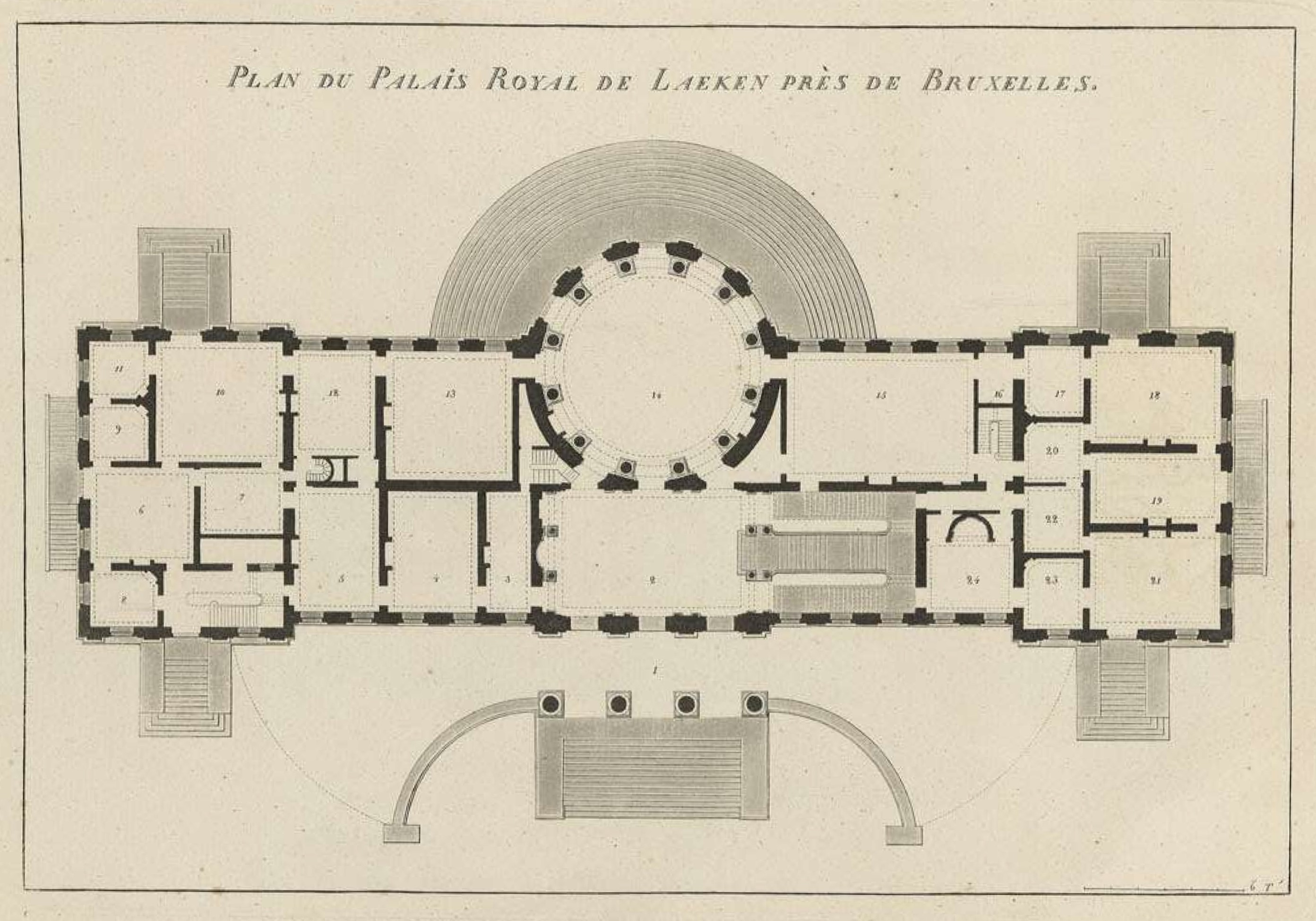
Floor plan of the palace (Goetghebuer, 1827)

=== Post-independence (1830–present) ===
Following Belgian independence in 1830, Rouppe, by then mayor of the City of Brussels, received the new King Leopold I at the Palace of Laeken on 21 July 1831, the day of Leopold's coronation. The palace was partly destroyed by fire in 1890, and was rebuilt and extended by the architect Alphonse Balat. The French architect Charles Girault gave it its present outline in 1902, with the addition of two new monumental wings forming a "U" shape with the main façade. The domain also contains the large Royal Greenhouses of Laeken, a set of monumental dome-shaped constructions, accessible to the public only a few days a year. They were also originally designed by Balat, with the cooperation of the young Victor Horta.

The Palace of Laeken has been the royal residence since Leopold I's accession to the throne in 1831. However, upon their accession to the throne in 1993, King Albert II and Queen Paola preferred to remain living in the Belvédère Château on the grounds of the park surrounding the palace. The current occupants of the palace are King Philippe, Queen Mathilde and their four children.

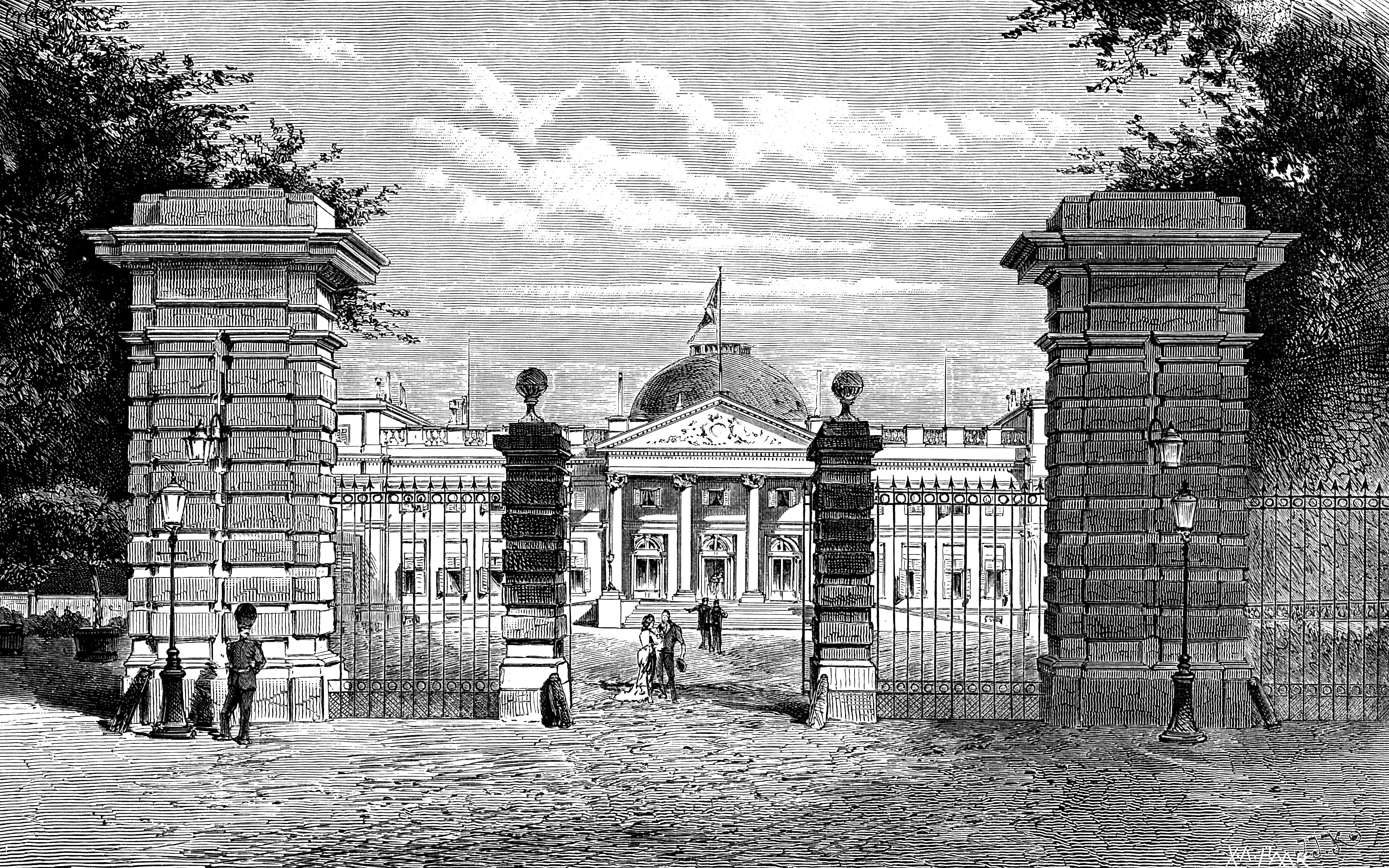
The Palace of Laeken in 1880, etching from L'Illustration nationale

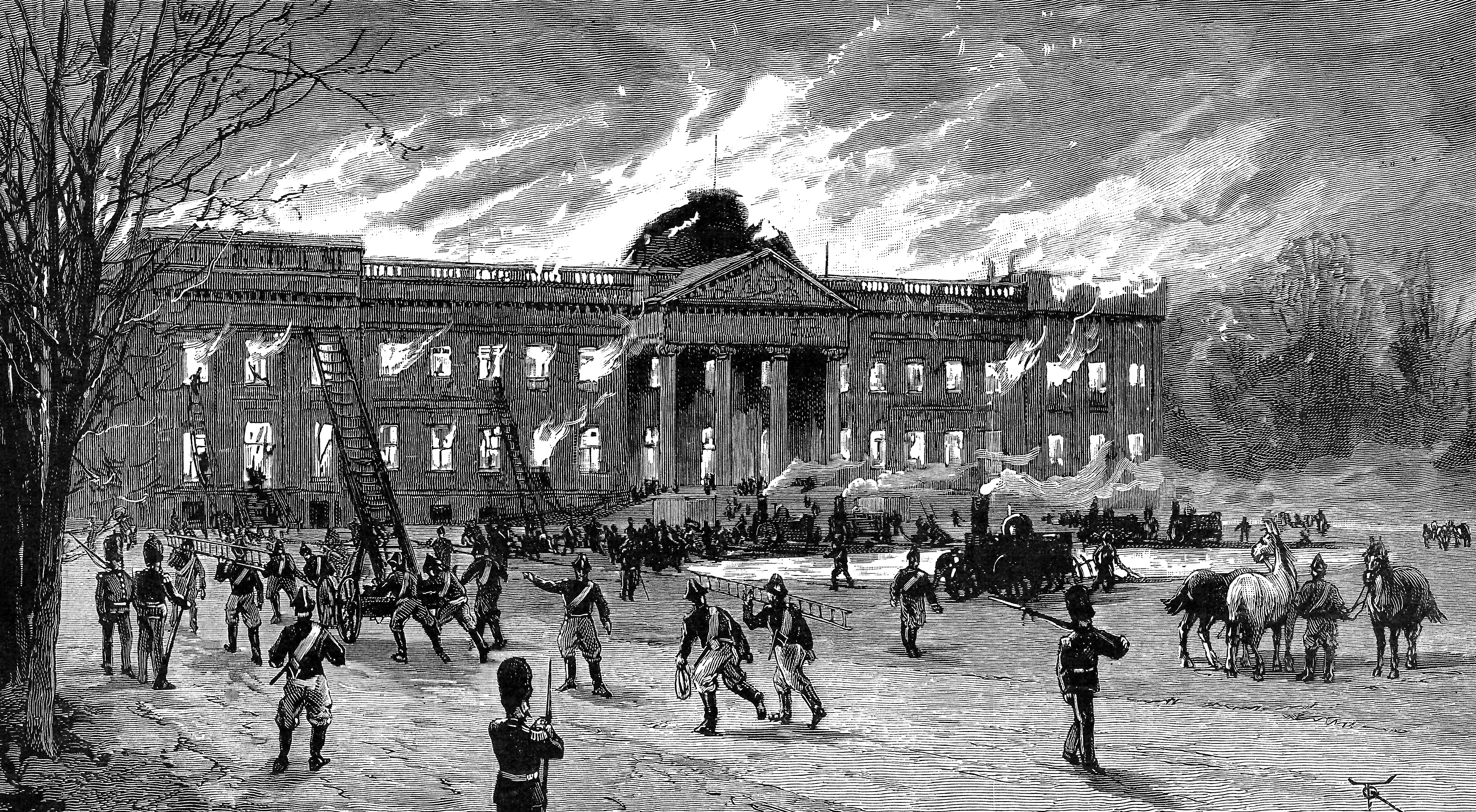
The Palace of Laeken on fire, 1 January 1890

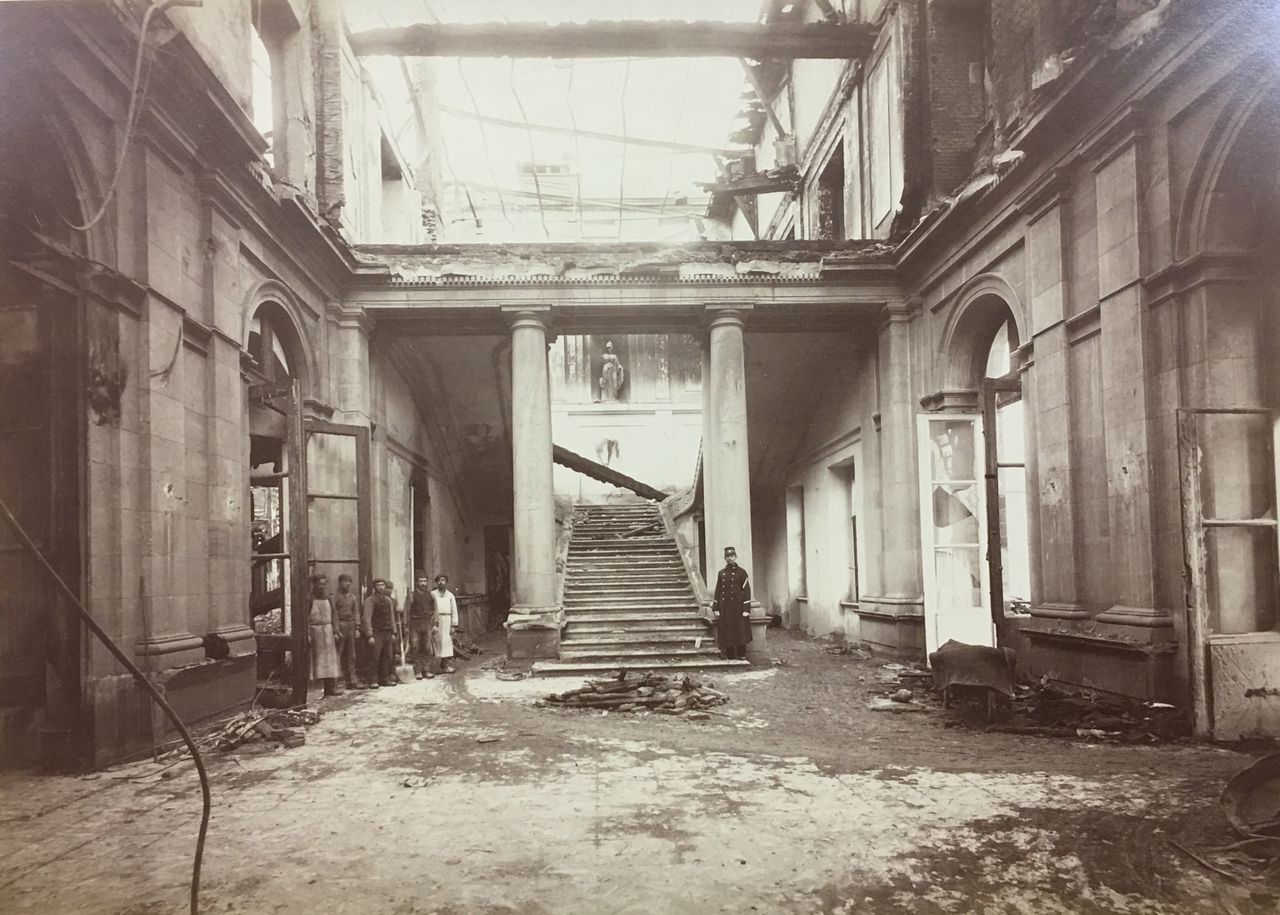
Aftermath of the fire

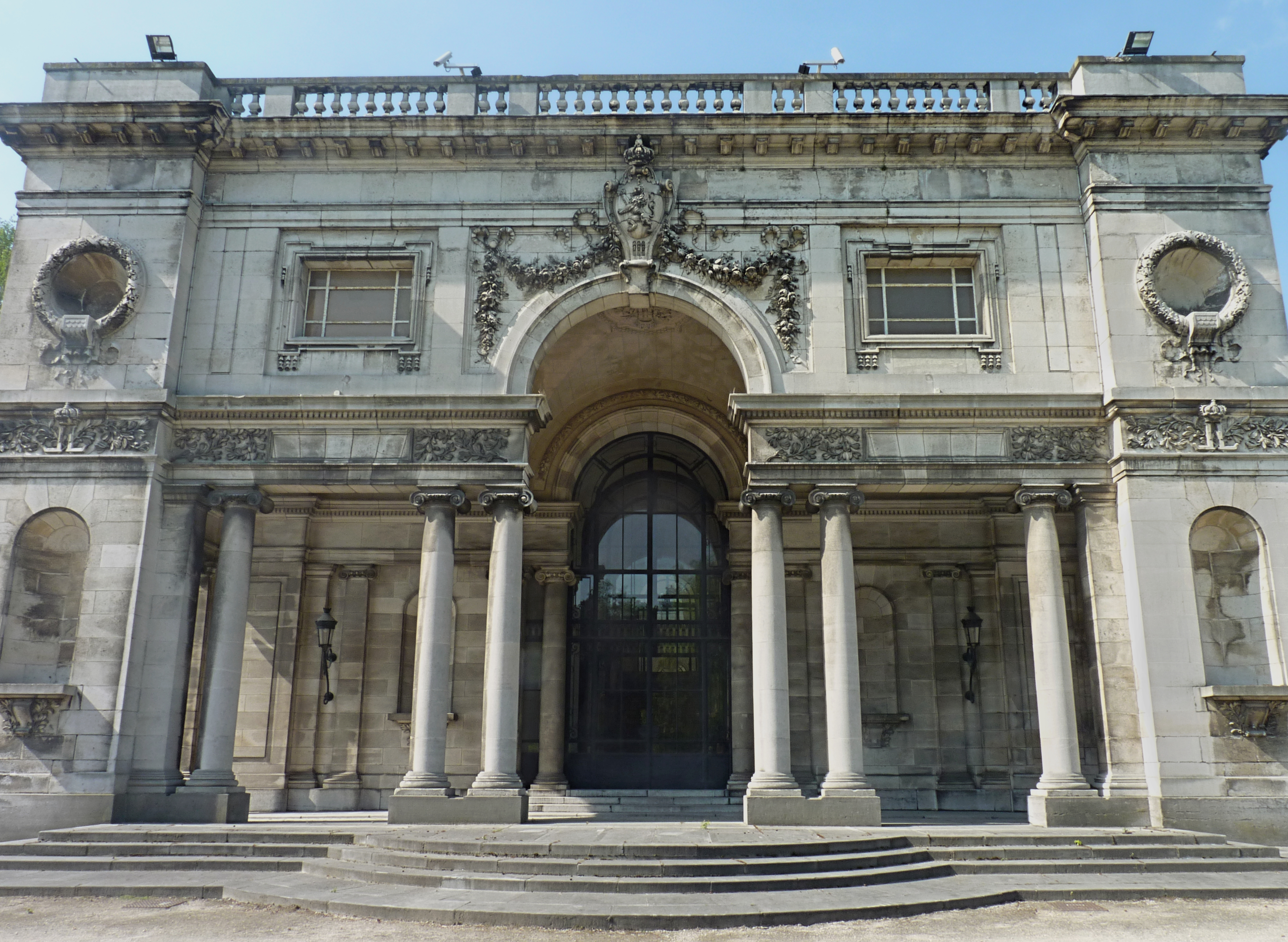
The wing built by King Leopold II

== Royal Domain ==
The Royal Domain of Laeken is extensive, about 460 acres (190 ha), or slightly smaller than Monaco. The gardens are surrounded by walls and iron gates, and are closed to the public, although there have been calls for the king to open at least a portion of the park for public use amid the COVID-19 pandemic in Belgium.

The gardens of the Royal Domain are landscaped in English style; the vast park includes lakes, a golf course and artworks. King Leopold II was very closely connected with the designs of his private gardens. It is in these gardens that his only son, Prince Leopold, Duke of Brabant, fell in a pond, and died subsequently from pneumonia, aged only nine. The king had trees planted for his new-born children, which still stand in the park.

There are various pavilions, including the Chinese Pavilion and the Japanese Tower. They were commissioned by Leopold II and now form part of the Museums of the Far East. The rooms of the Chinese Pavilion are designed in chinoiserie Louis XIV and Louis XVI styles. They are decorated with Chinese motifs, chinaware and silverware. The Japanese Tower is a pagoda (known as a Tō), inspired by a construction Leopold II saw at the Paris Exposition of 1900. Leopold II commissioned his architect Alexandre Marcel to build him a similar one in Laeken.

In the gardens live several colonies of Canada geese, hundreds of great cormorants and other large birds. The gardens are also home to one of the biggest colonies of grey herons in the country.

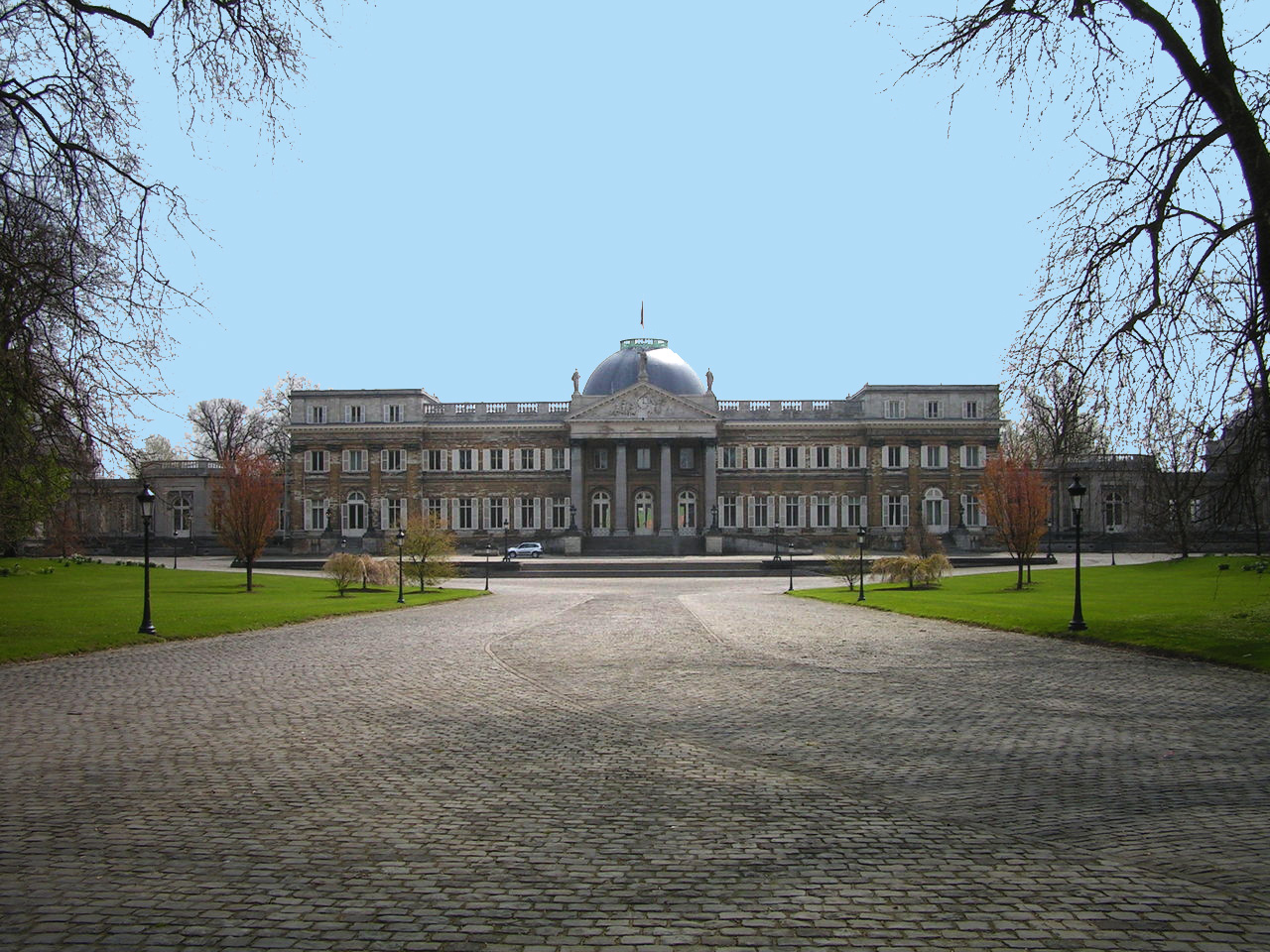
Main façade of the Palace of Laeken

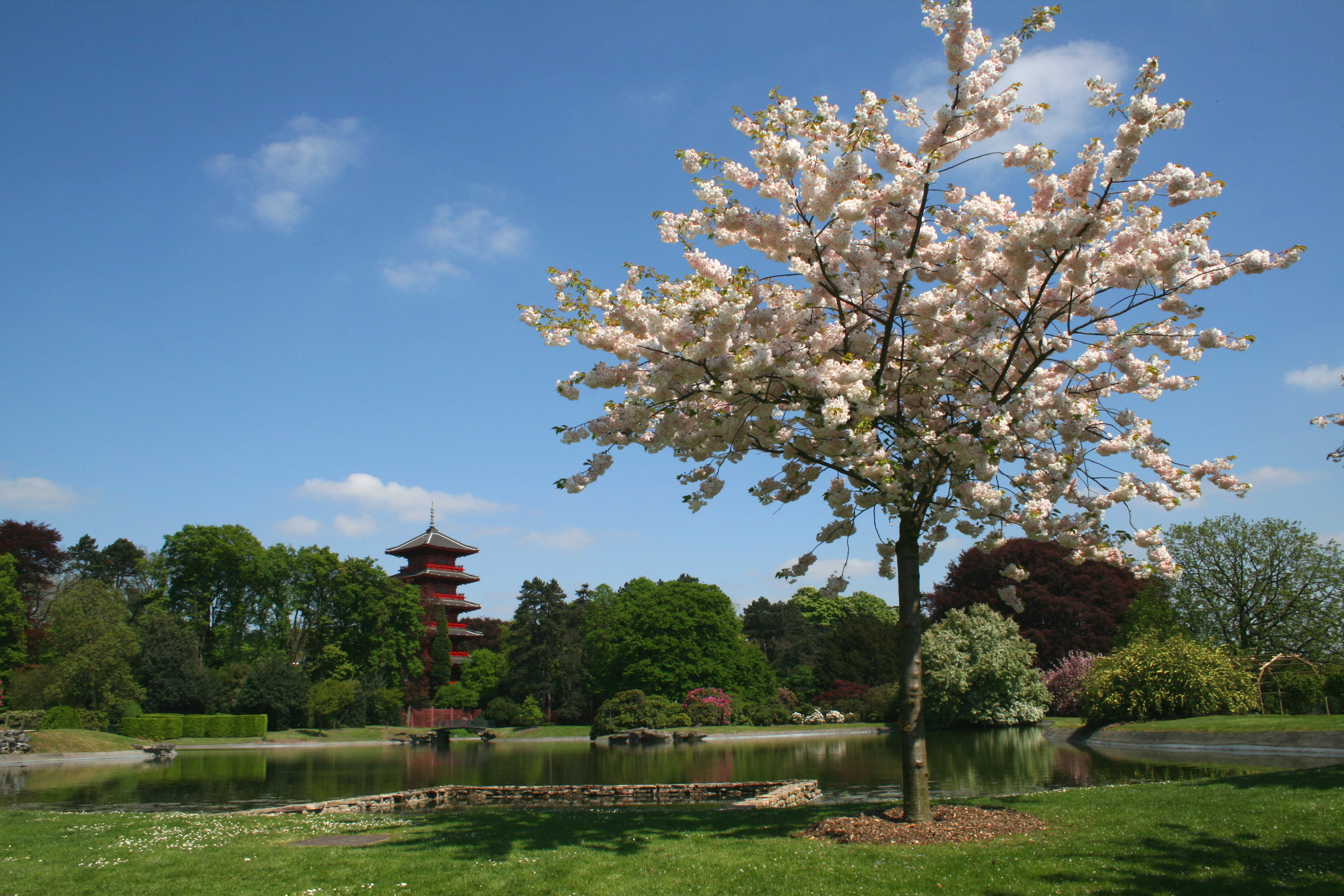
The gardens of the Royal Domain and the Japanese Tower

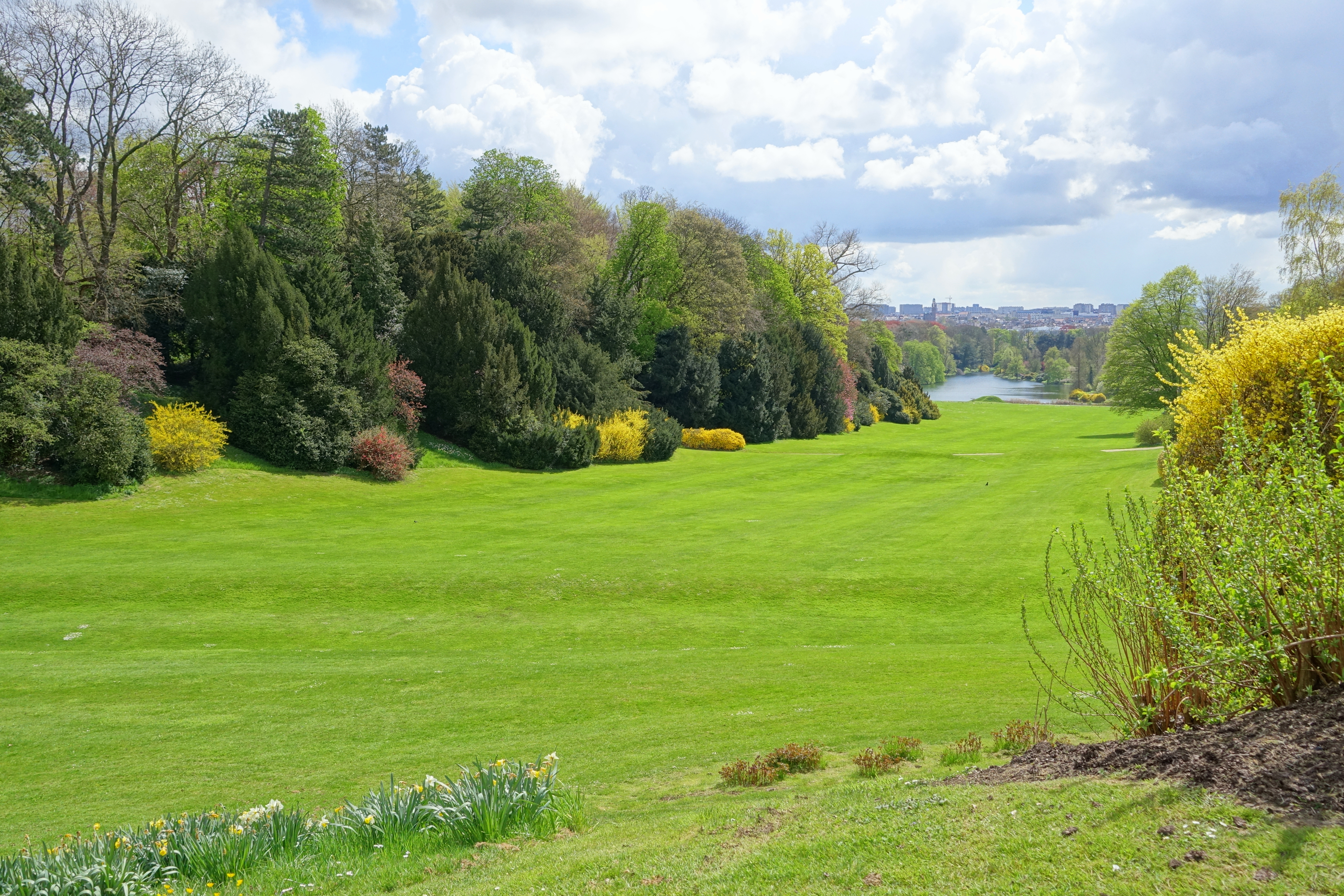
Great Lawn of the Royal Domain

== Royal Greenhouses ==
The Royal Greenhouses of Laeken are located within the Royal Domain and are attached to the palace via the orangery. They were commissioned by King Leopold II, originally designed by Alphonse Balat, and built between 1874 and 1905. Following Balat's death in 1895, Leopold called upon the architects Henri Maquet and Charles Girault. The total floor area of this immense complex is 2.5 ha (6.2 acres). The main greenhouses, such as the Congo Greenhouse and the so-called Iron Church, a domed greenhouse, which would originally serve as the royal chapel, are all linked by flowered corridors spanning hundreds of metres.

The complex is home to the famous Royal Botanic Collection, which includes large collections of camellias, orange trees and many plants originating from the African parts of the former Belgian Empire. Many sculptures and Chinese vases can also be found within the greenhouses.

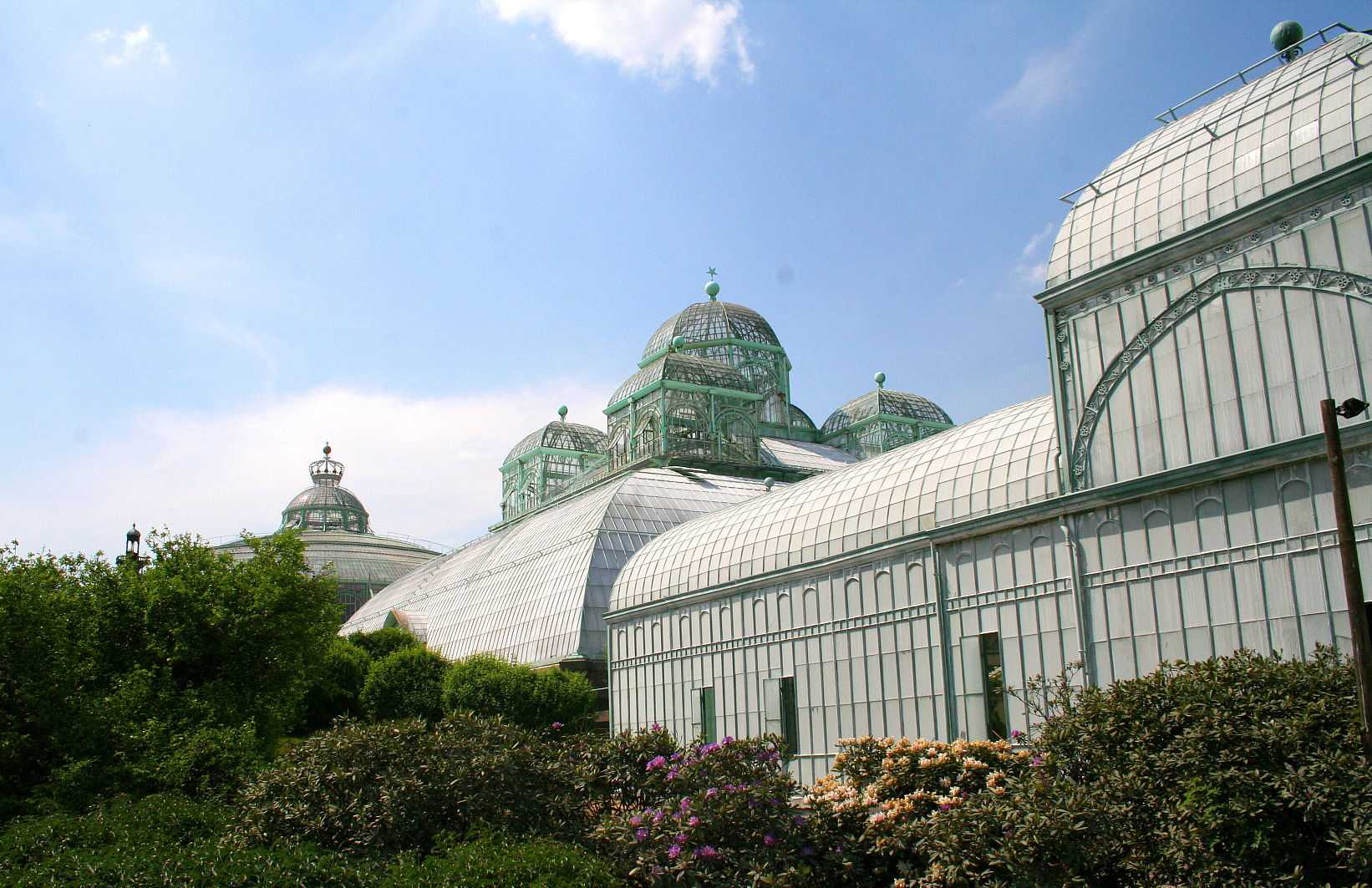
Royal Greenhouses of Laeken

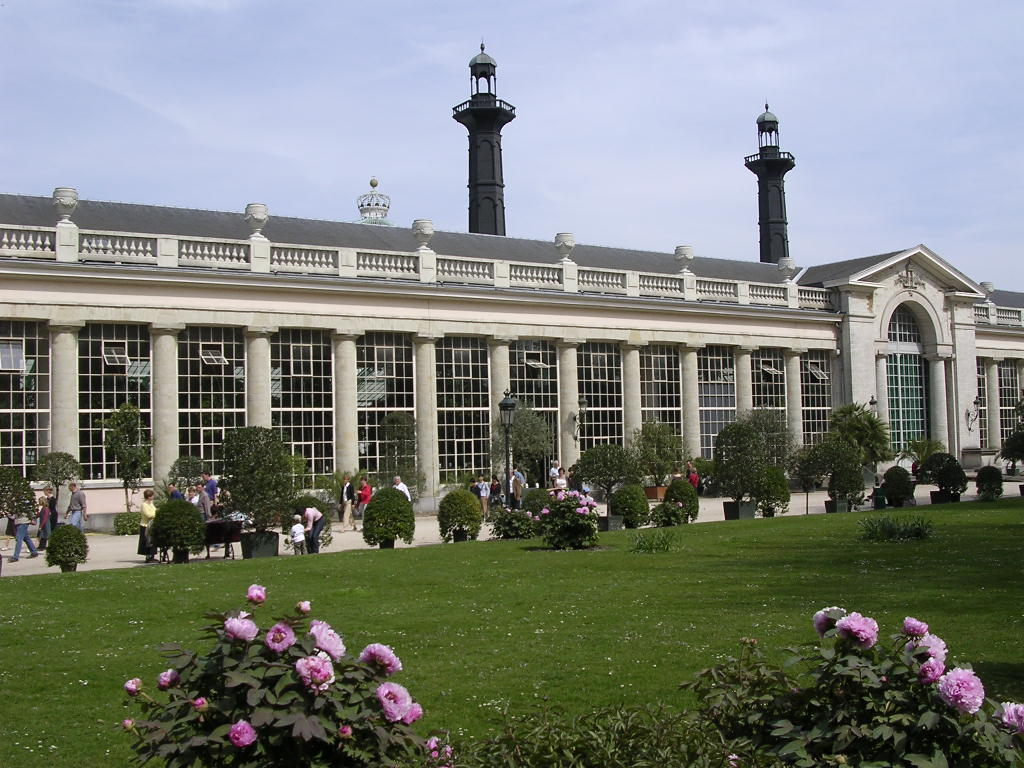
Orangery

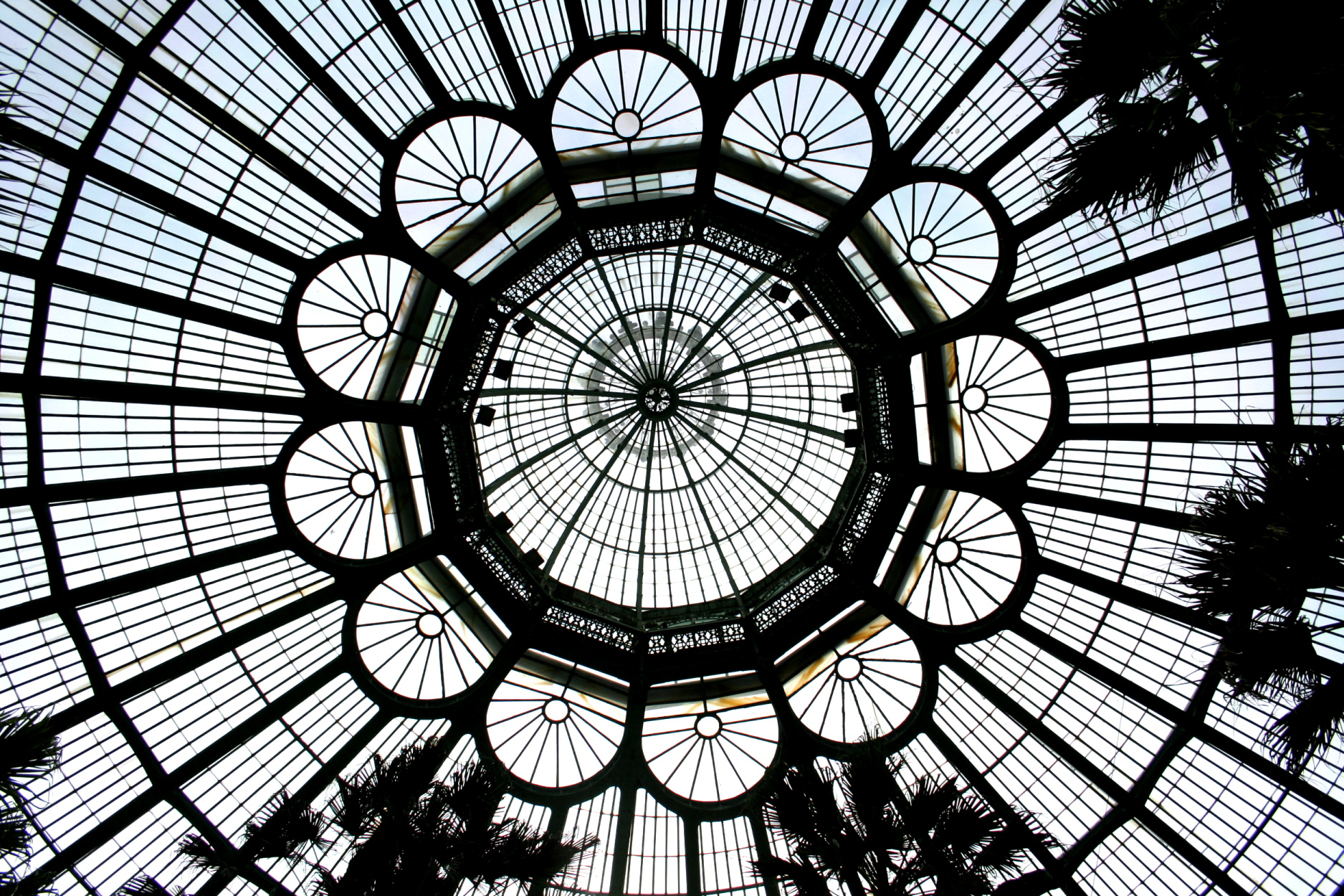
Under the dome of the Winter Garden

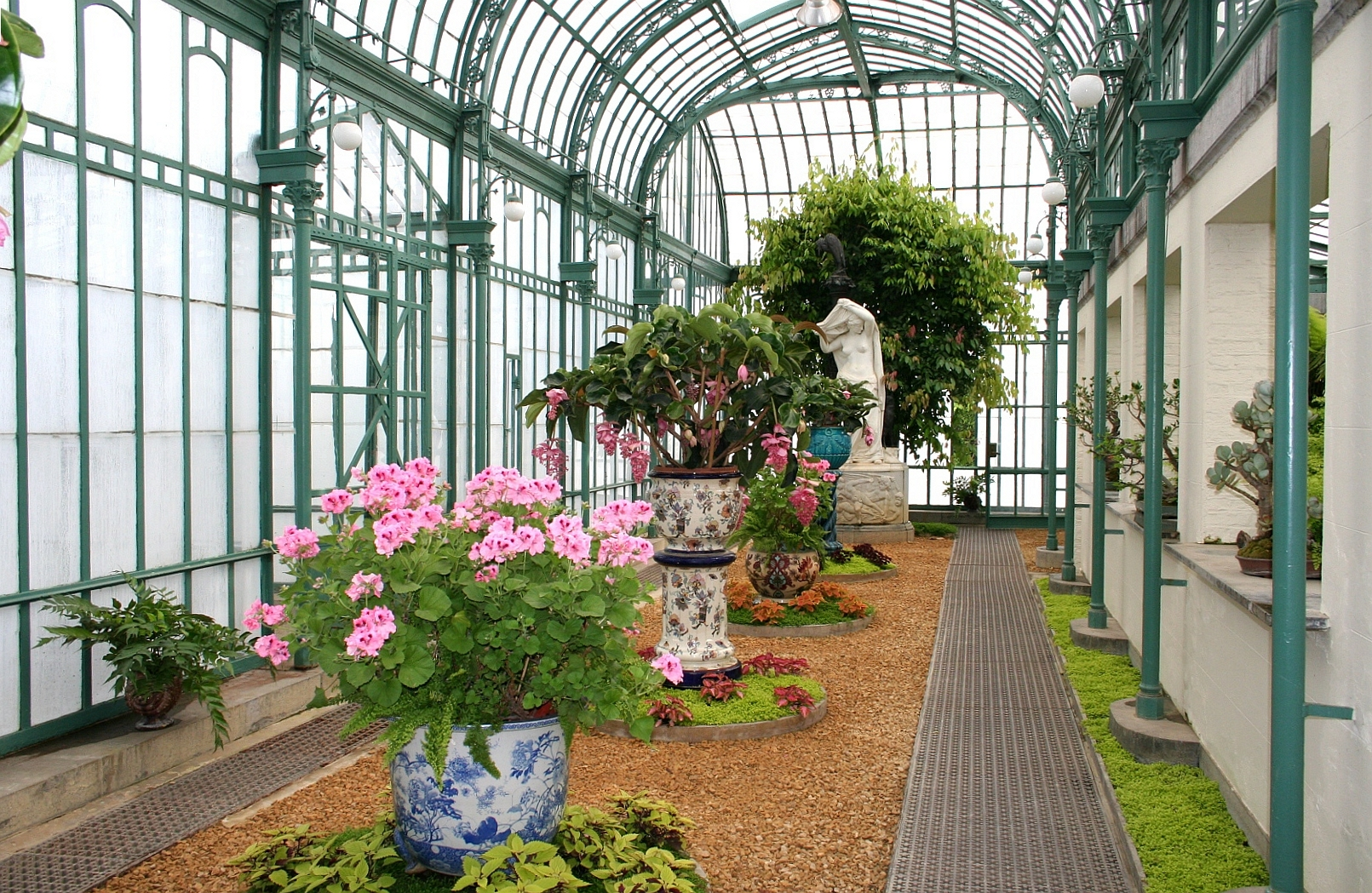
Interior of the Embarcadère Greenhouse

== Modern-day function ==
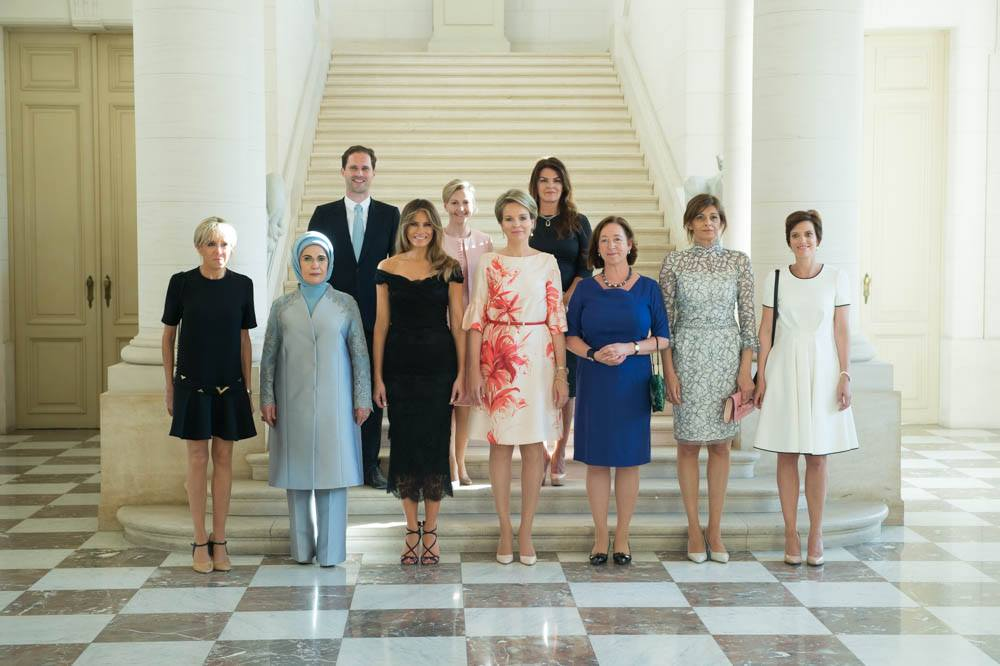
Queen Mathilde hosts official guests at the Palace of Laeken, 2017

The Palace of Laeken is mainly a residential palace and has a more sober and intimate character than the Royal Palace of Brussels. Since 1999, it has been the residence of King Philippe and Queen Mathilde with their family.

The Royal Greenhouses of Laeken are open to the public for three weeks each year during the flowering period, in April–May. The palace is known for its stables, the Chinese pavilion and the Japanese Tower. The painting studio of Elisabeth of Bavaria, Queen of Belgium, can also be admired.

At the request of Queen Paola, the play pavilion in which the children of King Leopold III grew up has been restored, so that Princess Elisabeth, Duchess of Brabant could play there with her siblings and cousins.

== Influence ==
Mobutu Sese Seko, the dictator of Zaire (the modern-day Democratic Republic of the Congo), built a palace in his hometown of Gbadolite modelled upon the Royal Palace of Laeken.

== Royal visitors ==
Among the foreign monarchs who officially visited the Palace of Laeken was Naser al-Din Shah of Qajar Iran. Accompanied by Leopold II, he visited the palace on 17 June 1873, and later wrote about it and its grounds in his travelogue.

== See also ==
- List of castles and châteaux in Belgium
- Royal Trust (Belgium)
- Neoclassical architecture in Belgium
- History of Brussels
- Culture of Belgium
- Belgium in the long nineteenth century
