= Jonkheer =

Dutch-language designation of nobility

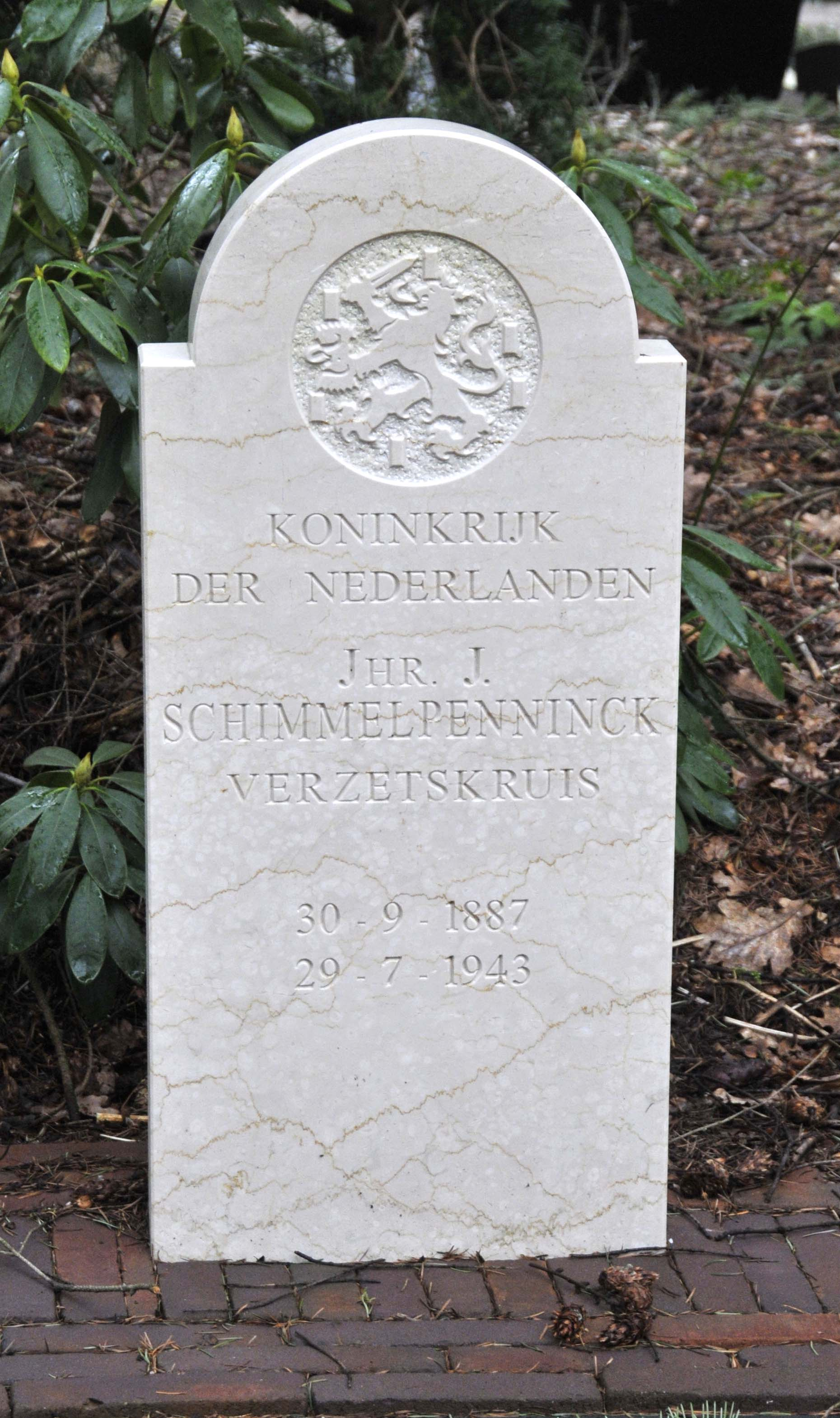
Grave of Jhr. Johan Schimmelpenninck. A wine merchant, he was active in the Dutch Resistance during the Second World War and was imprisoned and tortured, before being executed in 1943. The tombstone notes his Resistance Cross.

Jonkheer (abbreviated jhr.; feminine jonkvrouw, abbreviated jkvr.) is a Dutch-language designation of nobility used in the Netherlands and Belgium. In the Netherlands, it is a hereditary noble predicate (predicaat) used by members of the legally recognised nobility who do not hold a noble title. In Belgium, jonkheer and jonkvrouw are recognised as titles of nobility.

The term derives from Middle Dutch and is linguistically related to the German Junker, which historically referred to a young nobleman. In Belgian French-language usage, écuyer is the corresponding masculine designation.

== Netherlands ==
=== Honorific of nobility ===
Jonkheer or jonkvrouw is literally translated as 'young lord' or 'young lady' in Dutch. In the Middle Ages, such a person was a young and unmarried child of a high-ranking knight or nobleman. Many noble families could not support all their sons to become a knight, because of the expensive equipment. So the eldest son of a knight was a young lord, while his brothers remained as esquires.

However, in the Low Countries (and other parts of continental Europe), in most cases the head of most noble families carries a title, inheritance being by male lineage. As a result, most of the nobility is untitled in the Netherlands. Jonkheer, or its female equivalent jonkvrouw, developed therefore quite early into a different but general meaning: an honorific to show that someone does belong to the nobility but does not possess a title. The abbreviation jhr. (for men) or jkvr. (for women) is placed in front of the name, preceding academic but not state titles.

The honorific could be compared more or less with "Edler" in Austria or "Junker" in Germany, though due to circumstances of German and especially Prussian history, "Junker" assumed connotations of militarism absent from the Dutch equivalent. Ranking this with the British nobility, it is roughly comparable to "The Honourable" when the untitled person is a son or daughter of a baron, viscount, or the younger son of an earl; or "Lord" or "Lady" when the person belongs to the old untitled but high-ranking (Dutch) nobility from before 1815 (e.g. "Heer van X" or Lord of X).

A female spouse of a jonkheer is not named jonkvrouw but Mevrouw, translated into English as Madam and abbreviated as Mrs. (with the use of her husband's name). However, if she is a jonkvrouw in her own right, she can be styled as such (together with her maiden name), unless she chooses to use her husband's name.

== Belgium ==
=== Title of nobility ===
Jonkheer is, in Belgium, the lowest title and an official Dutch mark of status (not a title), as stated above, and is used as such, most notably by members of the Dutch royal family with the style Jonkheer van Amsberg.

Often however a title of nobility may be claimed by a family whose members are officially recognised only as jonkheeren, the title not being acknowledged by the modern monarchy either because the family is registered as untitled nobility and may thus only use the honorific or predicate, or because the family has not requested official registration of the title, but possesses a grant of nobility which predates the founding of the Kingdom of the Netherlands in 1815.

In Belgium, a number of families may bear the hereditary title of Jonkheer. Some notable examples include Jonkvrouw Mathilde d'Udekem d'Acoz (Queen Mathilde of Belgium) and Jonkvrouw Delphine Boël (Princess Delphine of Belgium).

=== French-language usage ===
In French-language Belgian nobiliary practice, the designation corresponding to jonkheer is écuyer.

The Belgian government's French-language guidance identifies écuyer as the lowest recognised noble title and confirms its legal status under the 1927 Court of Cassation decision.

Unlike Dutch jonkheer, which has the feminine form jonkvrouw, the French title écuyer has no corresponding feminine form in contemporary Belgian official usage.

The use of écuyer in Belgium should be distinguished from its historical usage in France, where the term developed within a different nobiliary and legal system.

== Coronet ==
Heraldic coronet of a jonkheer

The coronet of rank for the untitled nobility in the Netherlands and Belgium is the same as that for the rank of a hereditary knight, i.e. Ridder: a plain circlet of gold with eight golden points, each topped with a pearl; five of them are seen in a representation. Furthermore, the golden circlet of the heraldic coronet is surrounded with a pearl collar.

Unrecognised titleholders use the same coronet of rank as hereditary knights, described above. Unrecognised titles cannot officially use a coronet of rank and thus use the coronet that they have been historically awarded, if any at all.

== Jonker ==
Jonker (Dutch pronunciation: [ˈjɔŋkər], old Dutch spelling joncker) is another form of the word jonkheer. During the Dutch Republic this was however the primary designation given to the untitled – and office-bearing – nobles in the Netherlands. Later (especially in the 17th and 18th century) these jonkers often called themselves "Baron" after the German example, which was adopted by most of these noble families when the Kingdom of the Netherlands was established. At present, the variant title is still used to indicate a jonkheer, but most of these modern "jonkers", or thus jonkheren, however, often do not originate from the older untitled nobility, but from the Dutch urban and non-noble patriciate which were elevated into the newly instituted nobility during the foundation of the Kingdom of the Netherlands.

== Comparison with related European designations ==
The designation jonkheer has historical and social similarities with several terms used in other European nobiliary systems, although these are not exact equivalents.

The German Junker is linguistically related to jonkheer and historically referred to a young nobleman or member of the nobility.

The French Écuyer, originally meaning a shield-bearer or squire, was historically associated with noble status. Under the French Ancien Régime, it was used as a designation associated with the nobility. In contemporary Belgium, écuyer serves as the French-language counterpart of Dutch jonkheer.

The English Esquire developed into a designation associated with the landed gentry and other persons of recognised social standing. Unlike jonkheer in the Netherlands and Belgium, esquire does not itself denote membership of a legally recognised hereditary nobility.

Although these designations may be compared in particular historical and social contexts, they should not be regarded as equivalent legal ranks.

== Nickname ==
The best-known use of the honorific among English-speaking people is as the root of the name of the city of Yonkers, New York. The word was probably a nickname, as opposed to an honorific, associated with Adriaen van der Donck; a young Dutch lawmaker, pioneering politician and landowner in New Netherland. While his business ventures largely proved less than successful, the city of Yonkers takes its name from his steadfast work in the formation of the state of Manhattan itself.

The word, in reference to Van der Donck, is variously spelled among modern scholars. In Thomas F. O'Donnell's introduction to a translation of Van der Donck's A Description of the New Netherland, it is suggested that Van der Donck was known as "The Joncker". Russell Shorto's The Island at the Center of the World has "jonker", while Edward Hagaman Hall's book on Philipse Manor Hall uses "youncker".

Jonker Street (Jonkerstraat) in Malacca, Malaysia, which derives its name from Dutch, can be traced back to when the Dutch ruled Malacca from 1641 to 1798.

== See also ==
- Junker
- Edler
- Nobility
- Patricianship
- New Netherland
- Ridder (title)
- Yonkers, New York
