= Senator by right =

Senators by right (Dutch: senator van rechtswege, French: sénateur de droit, German: Senator von Rechts wegen) were non-elected members of the Belgian Senate.

If the ruling monarch of Belgium had any children, all of them who were above 18 years old could opt to sit in the Senate, as senators by right; if the current monarch had no offspring, the descendants of the branch of the royal house called on to reign were senators by right instead.

Theoretically, senators by right were entitled to vote in the Senate once they reached the age of 21. However, by constitutional convention they did not use this right. Their presence was also disregarded when calculating the quorum; to reach the quorum, 36 of the 71 elected senators had to be present. Until 2013, Prince Philippe, Princess Astrid and Prince Laurent were senators by right. When Prince Philippe became King, there were no senators by right.

As part of the sixth Belgian state reform, the function of senators by right was abolished effective as of the May 2014 elections.

== List ==
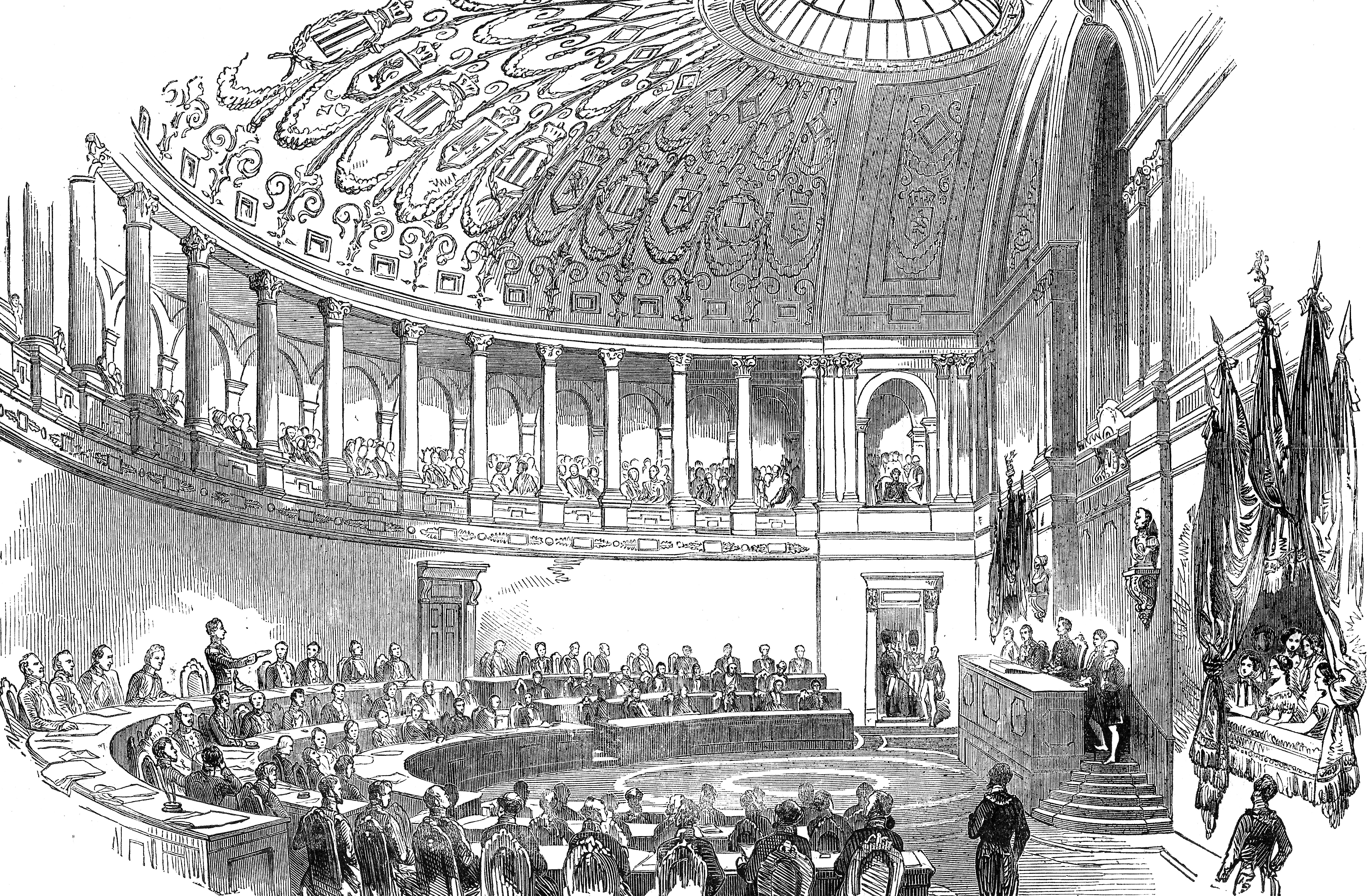
Installation of Prince Leopold as member of the Belgium Senate on 9 April 1853

The following people were senators by right between 1831 and 2014.
Senator	From	To
Prince Leopold, later King Leopold II	9 April 1853	16 December 1865
Prince Albert, later King Albert I	13 November 1906	23 December 1906
Prince Leopold, later King Leopold III	8 November 1927	23 February 1934
Prince Albert, later King Albert II	11 March 1958	9 August 1993
Prince Philippe, later King Philippe	21 June 1994	21 July 2013
Princess Astrid	20 November 1996	21 July 2013
Prince Laurent	31 May 2000	21 July 2013
