= Prince Amedeo of Belgium =

Belgian royal (born 1986)

Prince Amedeo
- Archduke of Austria (more)
- Born: 21 February 1986 (age 40); St-Luc University Hospital, Woluwe-Saint-Lambert, Belgium
- Spouse: Elisabetta Maria Rosboch von Wolkenstein (m. 2014)
- Issue: Archduchess Anna Astrid; Archduke Maximilian; Archduchess Alix
Names
- Amedeo Marie Joseph Carl Pierre Philippe Paola Marcus d'Aviano Habsburg-Lothringen
- House: Habsburg-Lorraine (agnatic); Belgium (cognatic)
- Father: Prince Lorenz of Belgium, Archduke of Austria-Este
- Mother: Princess Astrid of Belgium

Prince Amedeo of Belgium, Archduke of Austria (Amedeo Marie Joseph Carl Pierre Philippe Paola Marcus d'Aviano Habsburg-Lothringen; born 21 February 1986), Prince of Belgium, is a grandson of King Albert II of Belgium, and thus a member of the Belgian royal family. He is also heir-apparent to the headship of the House of Austria-Este, a cadet branch (originally a tertiogeniture, later a secundogeniture) of the House of Habsburg-Lorraine, and is sixth in line to the throne of Belgium.

== Birth and family ==
Amedeo was born on 21 February 1986 at the Saint-Luc University Hospital in Woluwe-Saint-Lambert, Belgium, as the first child and elder son of Lorenz, Archduke of Austria-Este, and Princess Astrid of Belgium. He bears the same given name as his paternal great-grandfather, Prince Amedeo, Duke of Aosta. His godparents are his maternal uncle, King Philippe and grandmother, Queen Paola of Belgium.

Amedeo himself is godfather to his cousin, Princess Elisabeth, Duchess of Brabant. Amedeo has one younger brother, Joachim (b. 1991), and three younger sisters, Maria Laura (b. 1988), Luisa Maria (b. 1995) and Laetitia Maria (b. 2003).

He was baptised and married by the archbishop of Mechelen-Brussels, Godfried Cardinal Danneels.

== Education and career ==
Amedeo undertook primary school and the greater part of his secondary education at the Jesuit school Sint-Jan Berchmanscollege (founded 1604) in Brussels, popular with Belgian aristocracy and royalty. He finished his secondary education at Sevenoaks School in Kent, England, between 2001 and 2004. He then spent a year in Belgium's Royal Military Academy. In September 2005, he began studies at the London School of Economics, where he graduated in 2008 with a BSc degree in management, and took a sabbatical before entering professional life.

From July 2009 to June 2012, Amedeo worked for Deloitte in New York City, first as a business analyst from July 2009 to June 2011, then as a management consultant in strategy and operations from July 2011 to June 2012. He then worked as a research analyst intern at Accumulus Capital Management, LLC from August through December 2012.

During 2013 and 2014, Amedeo resumed his studies, obtaining an MBA degree at the Columbia Business School of Columbia University. He subsequently returned to Belgium, where he worked for McKinsey & Company in Brussels from September 2014 to September 2016. In January 2017, he began working at the Gutzwiller private bank in Basel, where his father is a partner.

== Marriage ==
Coat of arms of the Rosboch family

On 15 February 2014, the Belgian Royal Court announced the engagement of Prince Amedeo to an Italian journalist, Nobile Elisabetta "Lili" Maria Rosboch von Wolkenstein (b. 1987), the only child of Italian film producer Nobile Ettore Rosboch von Wolkenstein (b. 1945) (Note: There is little visibility to date on the legal process that led to the formulation of the new surname Rosboch von Wolkenstein for the son of Elisabeth Jaworski von Wolkenstein, recognizing him as Undersecretary Rosboch's son & heir and sparing him the stigma of illegitimacy, the time limit for posthumous birth status – and consequently the presumption of legitimate paternity (Pater is est quem nuptiae demonstrant) – having most likely been passed.) and his wife, Countess Anna Maria "Lilia" de Smecchia (b. 1947, divorced from Paolo Cazzaniga), also a film producer. Both of her parents are members of families that once belonged to the Italian nobility.

Patrilineally, Elisabetta descends from the House of Caracciolo, as her father is probably a natural child of Prince Filippo Caracciolo di Castagneto and Elisabeth Jaworski von Wolkenstein (1915–1959), (Note: Elisabeth Jaworski von Wolkenstein (1915–1959) was the daughter of Romuald von Jaworski (sentenced to forfeiture of his nobility [Adelsverlust] for violating nobility codes of conduct in 1916) and Countess Maria von Wolkenstein-Trostburg (1882–1965).) who at the time of his birth had been widowed for one year from Nobile Ettore Bernardo Rosboch (1893–1944), (Note: Undersecretary Rosboch and his wife Elisabeth had a daughter from their marriage, Nobile Patrizia Rosboch, Ettore Rosboch von Wolkenstein's older half-sister.) the Italian Fascist Finance Undersecretary of State.

Amedeo and Elisabetta both descend from Don Giuseppe Tiberio Ruffo di Calabria-Santapau, 2nd Prince of Palazzolo, Count of Sinopoli (1627–1683) and his wife, Agata Branciforte-Colonna (1650–1720).

Through German princely dynasties, their most recent common ancestor is Franz Albrecht I, Prince of Oettingen-Spielberg (1663–1737) and his wife, Baroness Johanna Margaretha von Schwendi (1672–1727), heiress of Schwendi and Achstetten.

The couple's wedding was celebrated on 5 July 2014 in Rome's Basilica of Santa Maria in Trastevere, in the presence of the royal family (with the exception of his great-aunt Queen Fabiola), as well as members of the cadet branches of the House of Habsburg-Lorraine, including the bridegroom's grandmother, Margherita of Savoy, Dowager Archduchess of Austria-Este, and members of other dynasties, including Princess Margaretha of Luxembourg and her husband Prince Nikolaus of Liechtenstein, Princess Beatrice of York and Jean-Christophe, Prince Napoléon. The couple were planning to relocate to Belgium after the wedding.

Amedeo and Elisabetta have three children: (Note: Due to a royal decree issued by his uncle King Philippe, which limits the range of family members bearing the title "Prince of Belgium", Amedeo's children do not bear the princely title nor the style of Royal Highness.)

- Archduchess Anna Astrid Marie of Austria-Este (born on 17 May 2016)
- Archduke Maximilian Joseph Lorenz Ettore Karl Marcus d'Aviano of Austria-Este (born on 6 September 2019)
- Archduchess Alix Lorenza Anne Marie Josephine of Austria-Este (born on 2 September 2023)

== Succession rights to the Belgian throne ==
In 1991, Amedeo obtained, along with his mother and younger siblings, succession rights to the Belgian throne. In 1993, his maternal grandfather acceded to the throne as King Albert II and he became third in Belgium's line of succession, following his uncle Prince Philippe, Duke of Brabant, and his mother. Upon Philippe's marriage in 1999, the prospect of Amedeo inheriting the throne substantially diminished, and the birth of a daughter and dynastic heir to Philippe in 2001 dropped his place in the order of succession down to fourth and eventually to seventh, following the birth of Philippe's other children. The abdication on 21 July 2013 of his grandfather King Albert II promoted him to sixth in line to the throne.

Although an announcement of Amedeo's engagement was published on the Royal Family's website, no dynastic authorisation for his marriage was published prior to his wedding, as foreseen in Article 85 of the Belgian Constitution. Speculation in the media included a commentator on the military parade for La Une who, on 21 July 2014 (Belgian National Day), alleged that no royal authorisation was announced because the prince intentionally chose not to request permission to marry, and therefore Amedeo was no longer deemed in the line of succession. In November 2015, a royal decree expressing King Philippe's retroactive permission for the marriage was gazetted in the Moniteur Belge, without the consultation of the legislative chambers and in contravention of the Article 85 of the Belgian Constitution.

== Titles and styles ==
All the children of Princess Astrid and Archduke Lorenz bear the title of "Prince(ss) of Belgium", with the style of "Royal Highness", by Belgian Royal Decree of 2 December 1991, which is distinct from their traditional Austro-Hungarian titles.

== Military ranks ==
- 2004–2005 Royal Military Academy (Social & Military Sciences)
  - 2005 Para-commando Training: Parachutist Badge
- (Belgium) September 2005 – September 2007: Belgian Land Component, Warrant-Officer as Candidate-officer (Adjudant Candidat-Officier), after his formation at Royal Military Academy
- (Belgium) September 2007 – : Belgian Land Component, Second lieutenant (as a Reserve officer) of the Regiment Carabiniers Prins Boudewijn – Grenadiers

== Footnotes ==
Prince Amedeo of Belgium House of Austria-Este Cadet branch of the House of Habsburg-Lorraine Born: 21 February 1986
Lines of succession
Preceded by Princess Astrid of Belgium	Line of succession to the Belgian throne 6th position	Succeeded by Archduchess Anna Astrid of Austria-Este
