= Prince Gabriel of Belgium =

Belgian prince (born 2003)

Prince Gabriel
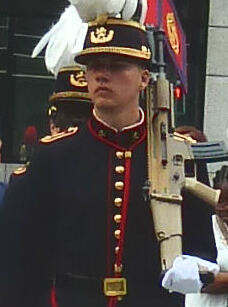
- Gabriel in 2023
- Born: 20 August 2003 (age 23); Erasmus Hospital, Anderlecht, Brussels-Capital Region, Belgium
Names
- French: Gabriel Baudouin Charles Marie; Dutch: Gabriël Boudewijn Karel Maria
- House: Belgium
- Father: Philippe of Belgium
- Mother: Mathilde d'Udekem d'Acoz
- Education: St John Berchmans College; International School of Brussels; National Mathematics and Science College
- Military career
- Service years: 2022–present
- Rank: Second lieutenant

Prince Gabriel of Belgium (French: Gabriel Baudouin Charles Marie, Dutch: Gabriël Boudewijn Karel Maria; born 20 August 2003) is the elder son and second child of King Philippe and Queen Mathilde of Belgium. He is currently second in line to the throne of Belgium after his elder sister, Elisabeth.

== Early life ==
Gabriel was born as the second child of Philippe and Mathilde, then the duke and duchess of Brabant. He was delivered at 01:15 CET on 20 August 2003 at Erasmus Hospital, the teaching hospital of the Université libre de Bruxelles in Anderlecht, Brussels. He was christened on 25 October 2003 at Ciergnon Castle, a summer residence of the Belgian royal family, by Cardinal Godfried Danneels, then Archbishop of Mechelen-Brussels. His godparents are his maternal uncle, Count Charles-Henri d’Udekem d’Acoz (b. 1985), and his second paternal second cousin, Baroness Maria Christina von Freyberg-Eisenberg (b. 1965).

King Philippe remarked in an interview that he chose the name Gabriel — unprecedented within the royal family — not only for its beauty, brevity, and strength, but also for its symbolic resonance across the three major monotheistic religions. The prince was named in the honour of his granduncle King Baudouin of Belgium, his godfather and maternal uncle Count Charles-Henri, and the Virgin Mary, whose name holds traditional significance in Catholic royal naming conventions.

Gabriel's elder sister, Princess Elisabeth, precedes him in the line of succession to the Belgian throne, in accordance with the 1991 adoption of absolute primogeniture. He also has two younger siblings: Prince Emmanuel and Princess Eléonore. Prince Gabriel was raised at the Royal Palace of Laeken, the official residence of the Belgian royal family.

== Education and military training ==
Prince Gabriel was initially educated at St John Berchmans College, a Dutch-language school in the Marolles/Marollen, Brussels, from September 2006 until September 2019. In September 2019, Gabriel was transferred to the English-language International School of Brussels, a private school in Watermael-Boitsfort. He finished his secondary education in August 2021. After completing his secondary studies, he took a one-year preparatory A-Level course in mathematics, further mathematics, and physics at the National Mathematics and Science College, a STEM-oriented sixth form college in Warwickshire, England.

In July 2022, the Belgian Royal Court announced that Gabriel would undertake military training. In August 2022, he entered the Royal Military Academy of Belgium, studying social and military sciences in Dutch language. Among the 162nd promotion, he received his blue beret in September 2022 and was trained under the name "Gabriël van Saksen-Coburg". In August 2024, Gabriel, as part of his training at the Royal Military Academy, started a five-month training at the Special Military School of Saint-Cyr in Coëtquidan, France, to study geopolitics.

Prince Gabriel speaks Dutch, French and English.

== Public appearances ==
In August 2013, Prince Gabriel accompanied his father, King Philippe, to a European Hockey Championship match in Boom, in which Belgium played (and won) against Germany. Prince Gabriel read the prayer intentions at his great-aunt Queen Fabiola's funeral in December 2014. Gabriel, his mother Queen Mathilde and sister Princess Elisabeth attended the finals of the Queen Elisabeth Music Competition on 12 May 2018. During the COVID-19 pandemic, Prince Gabriel had conversations over the phone with elderly people in residential care centers in order to encourage and support them. In December 2020, Prince Gabriel and his sister Princess Eléonore volunteered at a convenience store and a warehouse in Ghent. In June 2021, Prince Gabriel accompanied his father King Philippe on a visit to the 15Wing Air Transport at Military Airport Melsbroek. In April 2023, Prince Gabriel accompanied King Philippe on a visit to French Guiana, where they witnessed the launch of the Ariane 5 rocket from the Kourou Space Center. In May 2023, the Prince attended a garden party in honour of the tenth anniversary of his father's reign. On 21 July 2023, he and his sister Elisabeth were among the fellow students of the Royal Military Academy Belgium to parade during the Belgian National Day.

Prince Gabriel has been involved in the Scouts since he was eight years old and has become a patrol leader in the last few years.

== Personal life ==
Prince Gabriel plays the piano. He likes to practice taekwondo, football, cycling, tennis, swimming, skiing, sailing and hiking. He was a member of Royal Evere White Star Hockey Club, a Belgian hockey club based in Evere but decided to quit hockey in 2019 to focus on his school work.

== Titles, styles, honours, and arms ==
Styles of Prince Gabriel of Belgium
- Reference style: His Royal Highness

- His Royal Highness Prince Gabriel of Belgium

Prince Gabriel does not hold a personal title as younger princes were previously accustomed to receive in the past (such as Count of Flanders or Prince of Liège).

=== Honours ===
==== National ====
- Belgium: Grand Cordon of the Order of Leopold (20 July 2026)

=== Military ranks ===
- 30 September 2022 – 30 September 2025: Officer cadet, The Royal Military Academy.
- 30 September 2025 – present: Second lieutenant, The Royal Military Academy

=== Arms ===
Coat of arms of Prince Gabriel of Belgium
Notes As a Prince of Belgium and a descendant of King Leopold I, the Prince is entitled to use a coat of arms which was stipulated in the Royal Decree of King Philippe in 2019. Adopted 12 July 2019 Coronet Princely crown of Belgium Escutcheon Sable, a lion rampant or, armed and langued gules (Belgium), on the shoulder an escutcheon barry of ten sable and or, a crancelin vert (Wettin), overall a bordure or. Supporters Two lions guardant proper Motto French: L'union fait la force Dutch: Eendracht maakt macht German: Einigkeit macht stark Other elements The whole is placed on a mantle purpure with ermine lining, fringes and tassels or and ensigned with the Royal crown of Belgium.

Prince Gabriel of Belgium House of Saxe-Coburg and Gotha Born: 20 August 2003
Lines of succession
Preceded by The Duchess of Brabant	Line of succession to the Belgian throne 2nd position	Succeeded by Prince Emmanuel of Belgium
