= St John Berchmans College =

School in Brussels, Belgium

- Sint-Jan Berchmanscollege (Dutch)
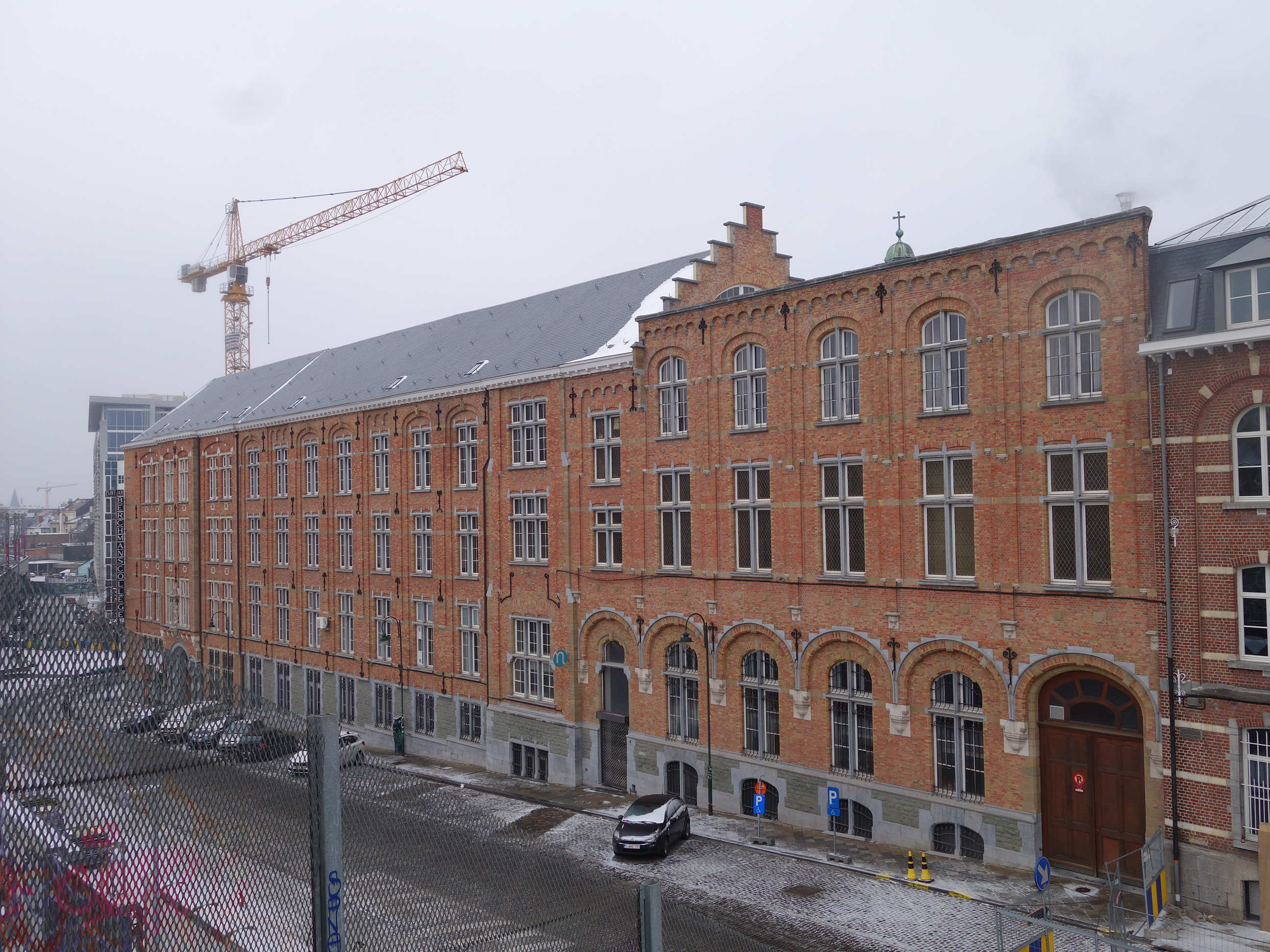

Location
- Rue des Ursulines / Ursulinenstraat 4; 1000 City of Brussels, Brussels-Capital Region; Belgium
- Coordinates: 50°50′31″N 4°20′57″E

Information
- Type: Secondary
- Religious affiliation: Jesuit (Catholic)
- Established: 16 July 1604; 421 years ago
- Website: www.sint-jan-brussel.be

St John Berchmans College (Dutch: Sint-Jan Berchmanscollege) is a mixed Dutch-language Catholic secondary school in Brussels, Belgium. It was founded in 1604 by the Society of Jesus and is named after the Jesuit Saint John Berchmans. It is situated close to the Church of Our Lady of the Chapel.

== History ==
The school was founded by the Jesuits on 16 July 1604 and had 400 students that same year. However, in 1773, the Jesuits were ordered to cease providing educational services by Pope Clement XIV. The school was closed on 20 September 1773. The furniture was confiscated and sold, and in 1816, the building became a court house. Later, the Belgian State Archives were housed in the building. In 1891, the archives were moved and the building was razed to make way for a road.

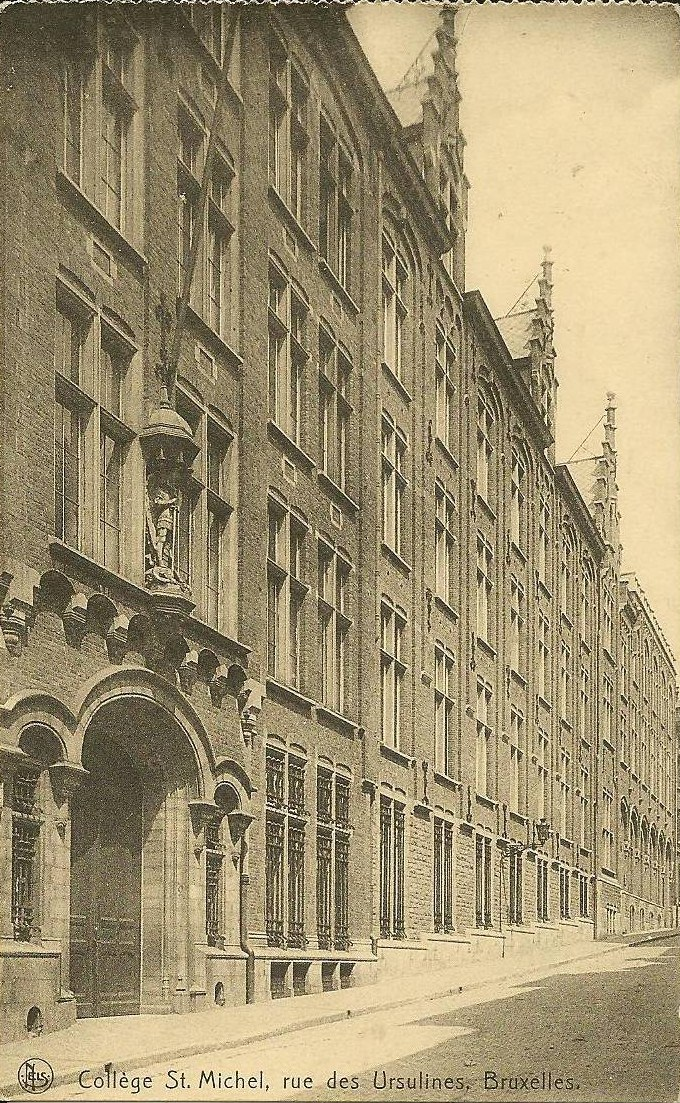
Early 20th-century college

In 1814, the Jesuits returned to Belgium and opened the French-speaking St Michael's College 19 years later in the Chapel Church area of the city. In 1905, the expanding population forced the Jesuits to not only expand the college but to also look for a location for a new college. In 1905, the college on the Rue des Ursulines/Ursulinenstraat was renamed as St John Berchmans College and the new college in the Etterbeek part of the city became St Michael's College. In 1912, the Church of St. John Berchmans was opened next to St Michael's College.

Starting in the late 1930s, a shift in language was made which would result in St John Berchmans College teaching in Dutch and English and the French-speaking section of the college being transferred to St Michael's College. The two separate colleges still exist today, each teaching in their respective language.

== Notable former pupils ==
Former pupils of the college include:

- Henri Carton de Wiart
- Pieter De Crem
- Paul De Grauwe
- Lorenzo Gatto
- Jan Grauls
- Felix De Laet, also known as Lost Frequencies
- Bart Laeremans
- Hubert Pierlot
- Prince Amedeo of Belgium, Hereditary Archduke of Austria-Este
- Princess Elisabeth, Duchess of Brabant
- Prince Emmanuel of Belgium
- Prince Gabriel of Belgium
- Princess Eléonore of Belgium
- Prince Joachim of Belgium, Archduke of Austria-Este
- Princess Maria Laura of Belgium, Archduchess of Austria-Este
- Princess Laetitia Maria of Belgium, Archduchess of Austria-Este
- Princess Luisa Maria of Belgium, Archduchess of Austria-Este
- Eric Van Rompuy
- Herman Van Rompuy
- Piet Van Waeyenberge
- Youri Tielemans

== See also ==
- List of Jesuit sites in Belgium
- Archdiocese of Mechelen–Brussels
