= Prince Emmanuel of Belgium =

Belgian prince (born 2005)

Prince Emmanuel
- Born: 4 October 2005 (age 20); Erasmus Hospital, Anderlecht, Brussels, Belgium
Names
- French: Emmanuel Léopold Guillaume François Marie; Dutch: Emmanuel Leopold Willem Frans Maria
- House: Belgium
- Father: Philippe of Belgium
- Mother: Mathilde d'Udekem d'Acoz
- Education: St John Berchmans College; International School of Brussels

Prince Emmanuel of Belgium (Dutch: Emmanuel Leopold Willem Frans Maria, French: Emmanuel Léopold Guillaume François Marie; born 4 October 2005) is the younger son and third child of King Philippe and Queen Mathilde of Belgium. He is currently third in line to the throne of Belgium after his elder sister, Princess Elisabeth, and brother, Prince Gabriel.

== Life ==
Emmanuel was born as the third child of Philippe and Mathilde, then the duke and duchess of Brabant. He was delivered on 4 October 2005 at Erasmus Hospital, the teaching hospital of the Université libre de Bruxelles in Anderlecht, Brussels. He was christened on 10 December 2005 at Ciergnon Castle, a summer residence of the Belgian royal family, by Cardinal Godfried Danneels, then Archbishop of Mechelen-Brussels. His godparents are his maternal aunt Countess Elisabeth d'Udekem d'Acoz (Margravine Pallavicini) and Guillaume, Hereditary Grand Duke of Luxembourg.

Emmanuel was initially educated at St John Berchmans College, a Dutch-language school in the Marolles/Marollen, Brussels, before transferring to Eureka Special School in Kessel-Lo in September 2012. In August 2020, the Belgian Royal Court announced that Emmanuel had transferred to the English-language International School of Brussels in Watermael-Boitsfort. Emmanuel graduated from ISB in June 2024.

Emmanuel likes to practice cycling, swimming, skiing, and sailing. He also plays the flute and saxophone, and also DJs under the name Vyntrix. He speaks French, Dutch, and English.

== Arms ==
Coat of arms of Prince Emmanuel of Belgium
Notes As a Prince of Belgium and a descendant of King Leopold I, the Prince is entitled to use a coat of arms which was stipulated in the Royal Decree of King Philippe in 2019. Adopted 12 July 2019 Coronet Princely crown of Belgium Escutcheon Sable, a lion rampant or, armed and langued gules (Belgium), on the shoulder an escutcheon barry of ten sable and or, a crancelin vert (Wettin), overall a bordure or. Supporters Two lions guardant proper Motto: French: L'union fait la force; Dutch: Eendracht maakt macht; German: Einigkeit macht stark; Other elements The whole is placed on a mantle purpure with ermine lining, fringes and tassels or and ensigned with the Royal crown of Belgium.

Prince Emmanuel of Belgium House of Saxe-Coburg and Gotha Born: 4 October 2005
Lines of succession
Preceded by Prince Gabriel of Belgium	Line of succession to the Belgian throne 3rd position	Succeeded by Princess Eléonore of Belgium
