= Erasmus Hospital =

Teaching hospital in Brussels, Belgium

Erasmus Hospital Hôpital Érasme (in French) Erasmus Ziekenhuis (in Dutch)
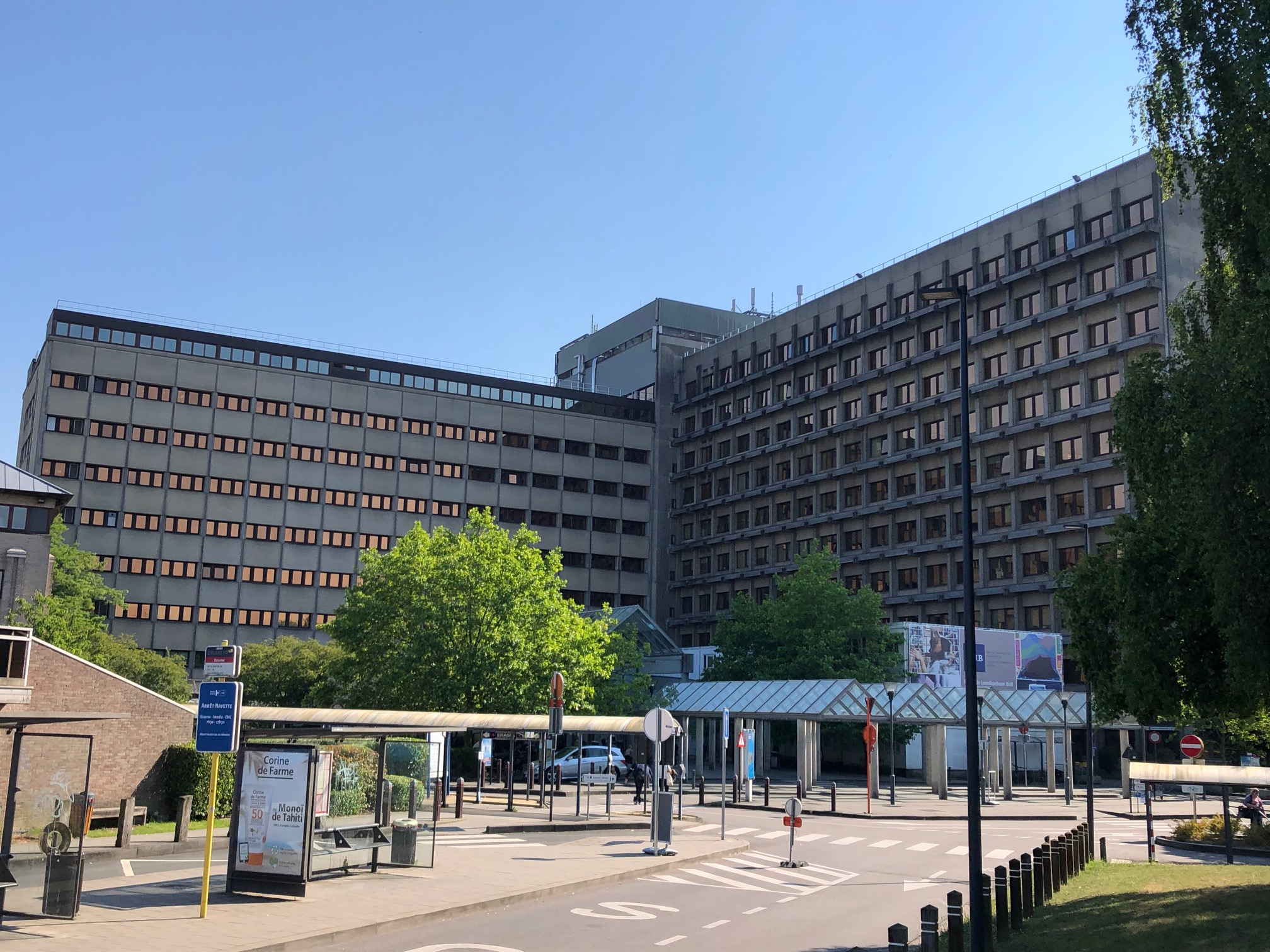
- Main entrance of Erasmus Hospital

Geography
- Location: Route de Lennik / Lenniksebaan 808, 1070 Anderlecht, Brussels-Capital Region, Belgium
- Coordinates: 50°48′49″N 4°15′58″E

Organisation
- Care system: Private
- Type: Teaching
- Affiliated university: Université libre de Bruxelles (ULB)

Services
- Emergency department: Yes
- Beds: 1,048

History
- Founded: 1977

Links
- Website: www.erasme.be/en
- Lists: Hospitals in Belgium

Erasmus Hospital (French: Hôpital Érasme; Dutch: Erasmus Ziekenhuis) is a teaching hospital in the municipality of Anderlecht, Brussels, Belgium. It is a research hospital associated with the Université libre de Bruxelles (ULB), and was opened in 1977. It has 1,048 beds and 4,000 employees, treating between 25,000 and 30,000 inpatients and between 350,000 and 400,000 outpatients each year.

== Toponymy ==
The hospital is named after the Dutch humanist writer and theologian Erasmus of Rotterdam who, in the 16th century, stayed in the canons' house in central Anderlecht (now part of Brussels, then a separate village on the outskirts), near the Church of St. Peter and St. Guidon.

== History ==
Until the 1960s, St. Peter's Hospital in Brussels' city centre and Brugmann Hospital in Laeken were the university clinics of the Free University of Brussels' Faculty of Medicine, but with the increasing need for hospital capacity and the increasing number of students, these two clinics were no longer sufficient. In addition, the Katholieke Universiteit Leuven (KU Leuven) and its French-speaking spin-off, the Université catholique de Louvain (UCLouvain), had made plans in the late 1960s to build a new university clinic in the east of Brussels; today's Saint-Luc University Hospital.

The Free University pushed ahead with their hospital plans, and in 1968, the Federal Ministry of Health approved the construction of a university hospital with 1,500 beds. However, in 1969, the French and Dutch entities of the Free University separated into two distinct sister universities, thus two university hospitals were created in Brussels with 900 beds by the French-speaking Université libre de Bruxelles (ULB) and 600 beds by the Dutch-speaking Vrije Universiteit Brussel (VUB), the latter emerging as UZ Brussel in Jette (north-west Brussels).

The construction work for Erasmus Hospital began in October 1971 on an open field at the limit of Anderlecht (south-west Brussels) with the Pajottenland (Flemish Brabant). The hospital was inaugurated in 1977 and gradually moved into the building the following years. The hospital's first medical director was Alain De Wever, who was one of the main initiators of the project while still a student in the 1960s. Buildings for laboratories followed in 1978 and a new site for the School of Public Health was also constructed. At the beginning of 1979, only 200 beds were available, with the number increasing to 300 beds at the end of that year. In 1981–82, the Anatomy and Pathology departments moved from downtown to a new building on the Erasmus campus (building C). In November 1981, the Neurosurgery department was opened, which later became one of the most world-renowned departments under Jacques Brotchi. In April 1986, the number of beds exceeded 800 places. In 1991, the Faculty of Medicine moved entirely to the campus. In 1994, the Museum of Medicine was established.

The hospital was connected to the Brussels Metro in 2003 and Erasme/Erasmus metro station has been the terminus of line 5 ever since. Beginning in 2018, the modernisation and extension of the hospital, called New Erasme, will start in the south-west of the campus, next to the Jules Bordet Institute.

== Erasmus campus ==
A medical campus and science park have developed around Erasmus Hospital, on which are located the ULB's Faculty of Medicine (with around 3,500 students), the Faculty of Movement Sciences (with around 1,100 students) and the School of Public Health (with around 600 students), as well as numerous research institutions and branches of the pharmaceutical industry as part of Erasmus Research Park. There is also an outpatient consultation centre, Erasmus Medical Center (EMC), and an outpatient radiology centre, Imedia Erasmus Center.

Since December 2021, in addition to the university hospital, the new building for the Jules Bordet Institute, an oncology specialist clinic, has also been set up on site. This clinic had already been administratively merged with Erasmus Hospital in 2018. It is named after the immunologist and microbiologist, Jules Bordet, who won the Nobel Prize in Physiology or Medicine in 1919 for his discoveries relating to immunity.

Erasmus Hospital also includes a number of other sites such as Queen Fabiola Children's University Hospital in Laeken (north-west Brussels), polyclinics in the city centre (Lothier Polyclinic) and in Nivelles, a specialist geriatric clinic (Geriatric Rehabilitation Center – CRG) and a special rehabilitation clinic (Center for Traumatology and Readaptation – CTR) in north-west Brussels.

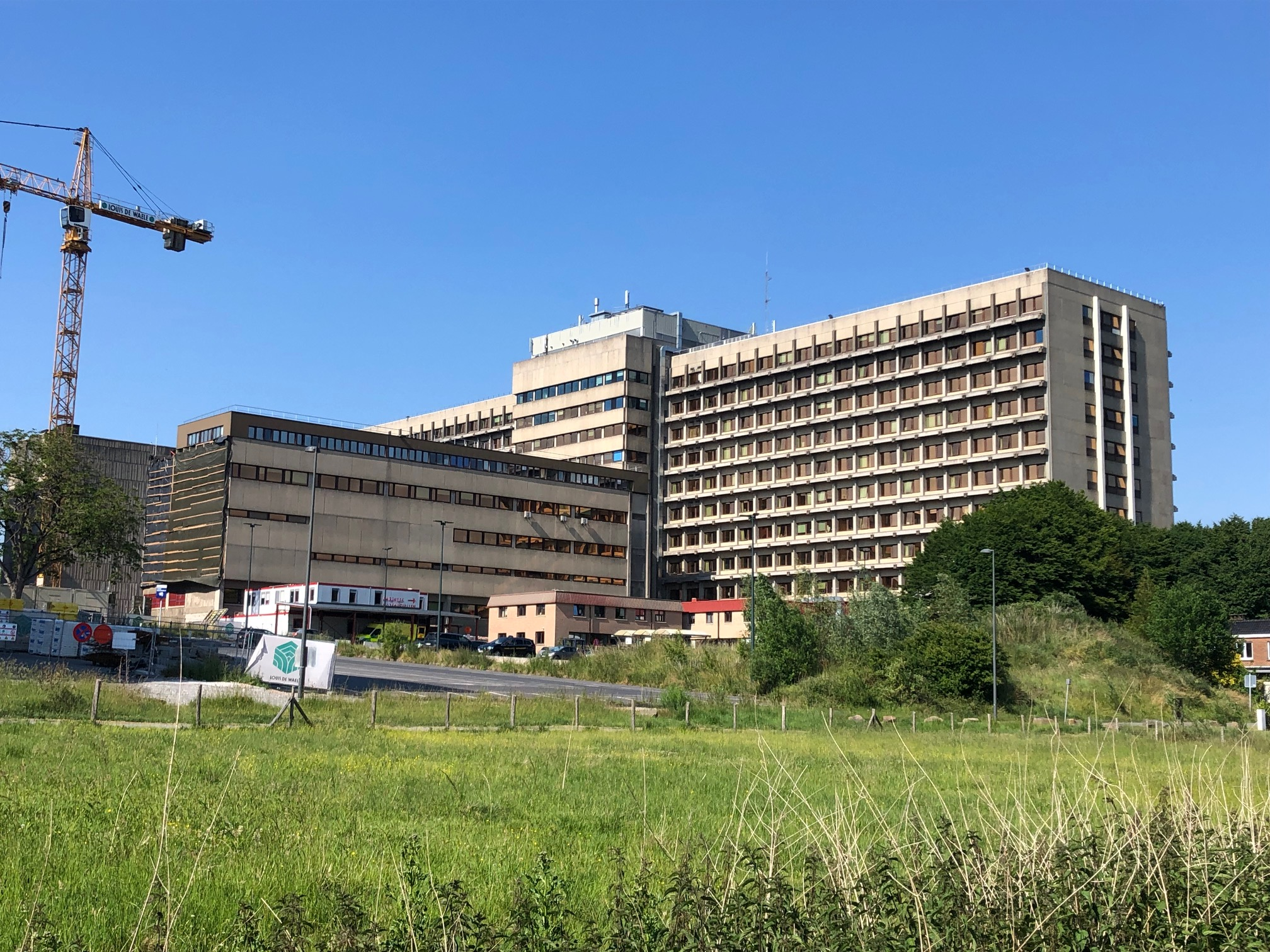
View of Erasmus Hospital from the south (Rue Meylemeersch/Mijlenmeersstraat)

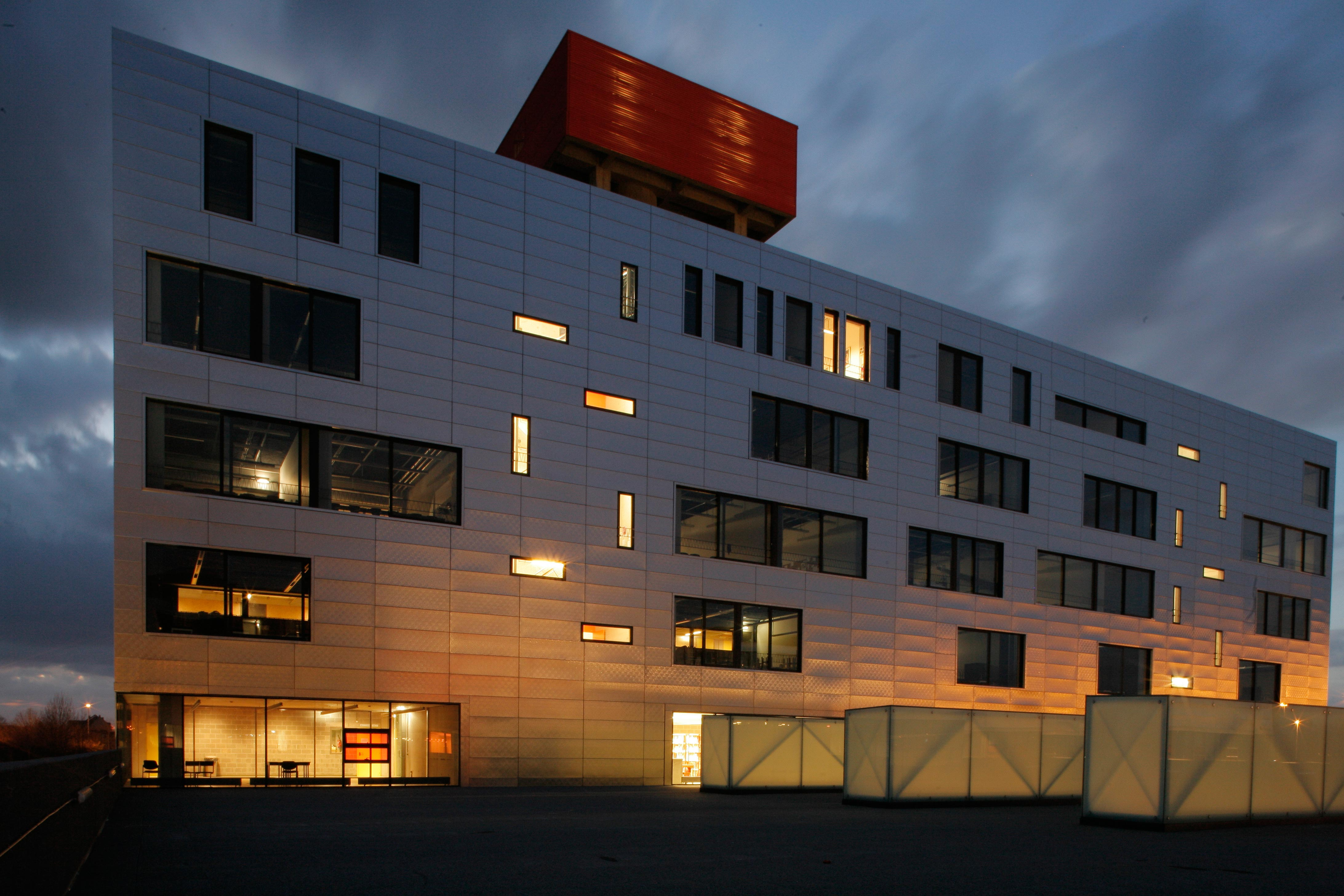
Extension for the Erasmus Hospital by MA² - Metzger & Associates Architecture

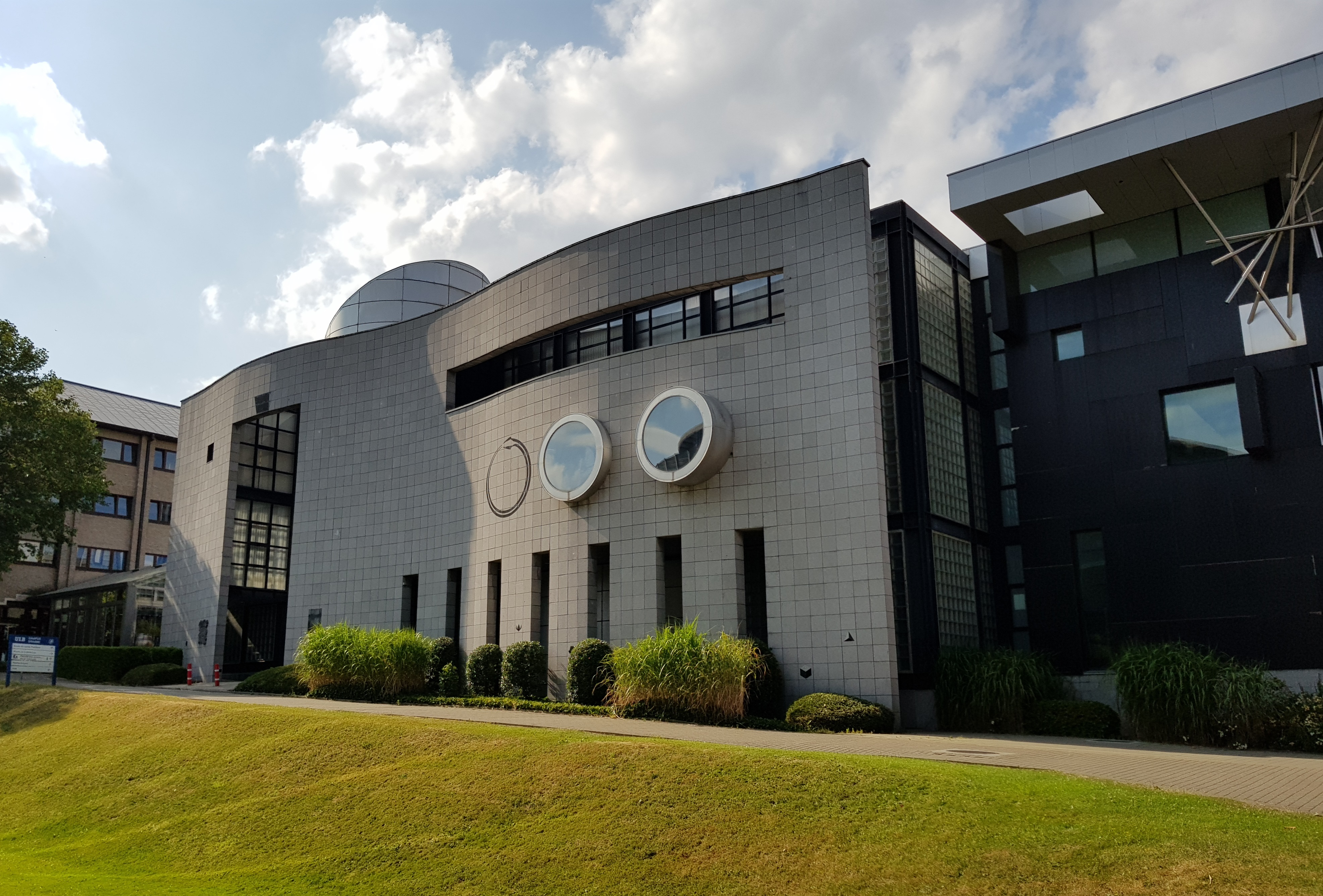
The Museum of Medicine on the Erasmus campus of the Université libre de Bruxelles (ULB)

== Famous births ==
All four children of King Philippe and Queen Mathilde (Princess Elisabeth, Prince Gabriel, Prince Emmanuel and Princess Eléonore) were born at Erasmus Hospital.

== See also ==
- List of hospitals in Belgium
- Healthcare in Belgium
