= Succession to the Belgian throne =

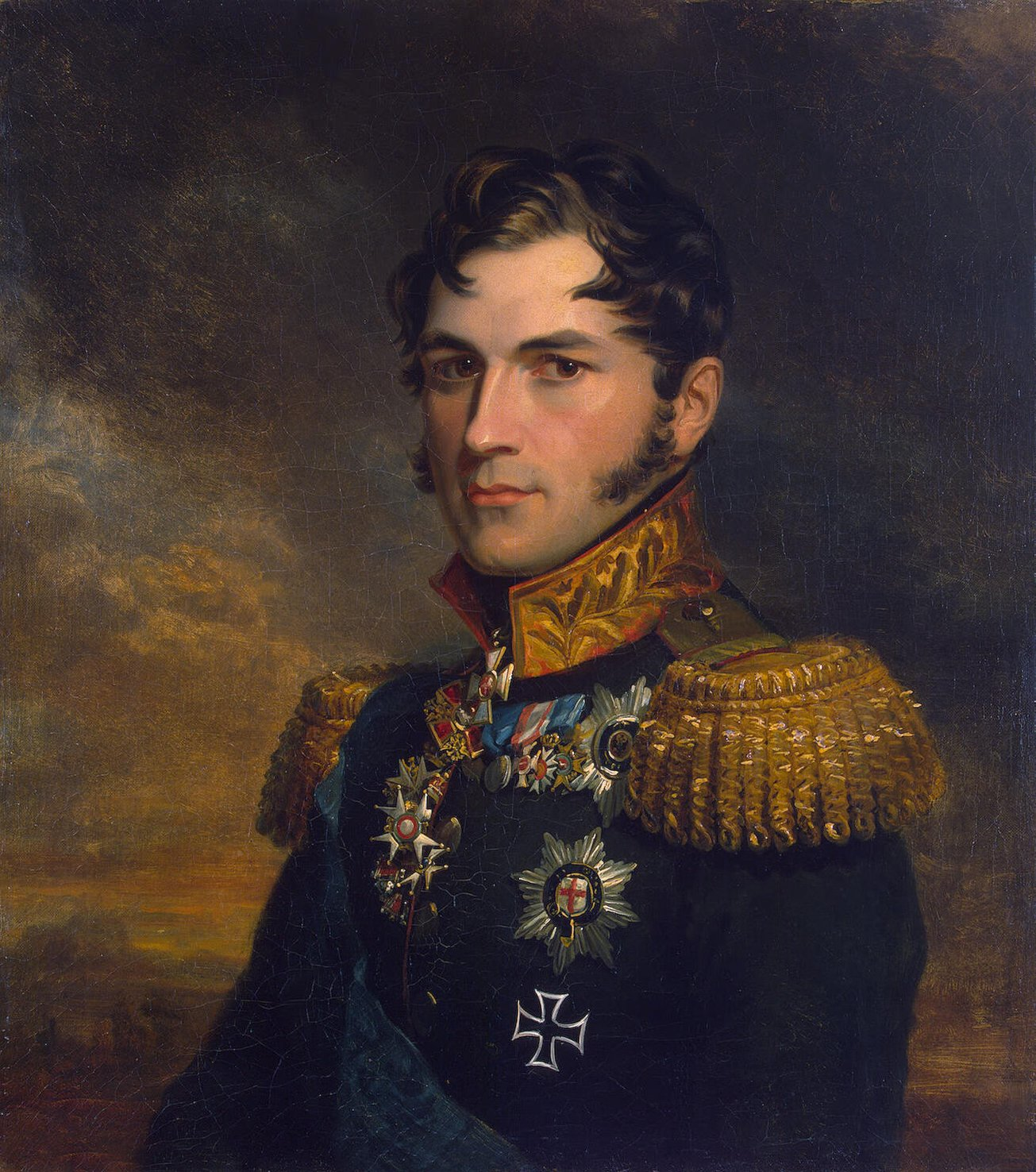
Right to the throne is derived from appropriate descent from King Leopold I.

There are eighteen people in the line of succession to the Belgian throne.

The monarch is considered to have acceded to the throne upon her/his taking of the oath as required by article 91 of the constitution.

== Eligibility ==
Since 1991, Belgium practises absolute primogeniture among the descendants of King Albert II (then Prince of Liège). Descendants of earlier monarchs and princes are only eligible to succeed if male and descended from King Leopold I in male-line (i.e. according to agnatic primogeniture), meaning that descendants of all Belgian princesses not descended from Albert II are barred from the throne. There are no living princes of Belgium who are not descended from Albert II, so agnatic primogeniture de facto no longer applies, and the right to succeed is effectively limited to Albert II's descendants.

A person is deprived of his or her rights to the crown if he or she marries without the consent of the monarch (or the consent of those exercising the monarch's powers). The lost right may be re-established by the monarch (or by those exercising the monarch's powers) in the event of parliamentary agreement. Should there be no eligible descendant of King Leopold I, the reigning monarch may name his or her heir presumptive with the approval of the Parliament, but if she or he doesn't name the heir presumptive, the throne would eventually become vacant.

In the case of a vacancy, Parliament would appoint a Regent (see below), then elections would happen within two months, and the new sitting of Parliament would jointly appoint the next monarch.

When King Albert II's daughter Astrid married Archduke Lorenz of Austria-Este in 1984, agnatic primogeniture being in effect, she had no succession rights and therefore did not seek the consent to her marriage. Following the introduction of absolute primogeniture among her father's descendants in 1991, it was deemed that she had obtained the necessary consent and thus assumed her place in the line along with her children.

When Prince Amedeo married in 2014, it was reported that he did not ask his uncle King Philippe's permission, and had therefore lost his right to the Belgian throne. However, on November 12, 2015, a Royal Decree was published which showed that consent had been given after the marriage retroactively.

In October 2020 the Belgian Court of Appeals granted the title of Princess to Delphine Boël, the illegitimate daughter of King Albert II, but because of her being born out of wedlock, she did not enter the line of succession. Since she was born in 1968 after her three legitimate half-siblings she would not displace any of her kin regardless and would only come after her half-nephew Prince Aymeric.

No foreign head of state may become Belgian monarch, unless both Houses of Parliament separately agree to it, two-thirds of the Members being present in each House, and a two-thirds majority being required in each House.

== Accession ==
In Belgium, unlike in most other European monarchies where the succession is automatic, there is an interregnum between each monarch's demise and his successor's accession. This is because a monarch can only accede to the throne after taking an oath during a joint session of both Houses of Parliament.

The oath is prescribed as follows: "I swear to observe the Constitution and the laws of the Belgian people, to maintain national independence and territorial integrity."

Upon the monarch's death, both Houses of Parliament convene within ten days with no convocation and, until a successor takes the oath of office, the Ministers jointly fulfil the constitutional duties of the monarch under their own responsibility.

If the monarch is prevented from reigning or is a minor, the Houses of Parliament jointly designate a Regent, who enters into office by taking the above oath. There can only be one Regent.

== Current list of succession ==
- King Albert II (born 1934)
  - King Philippe (born 1960)
    - (1) Princess Elisabeth, Duchess of Brabant (b. 2001)
    - (2) Prince Gabriel (b. 2003)
    - (3) Prince Emmanuel (b. 2005)
    - (4) Princess Eléonore (b. 2008)
  - (5) Princess Astrid, Archduchess of Austria-Este (b. 1962)
    - (6) Prince Amedeo, Archduke of Austria-Este (b. 1986)
      - (7) Archduchess Anna Astrid of Austria-Este (b. 2016)
      - (8) Archduke Maximilian of Austria-Este (b. 2019)
      - (9) Archduchess Alix of Austria-Este (b. 2023)
    - (10) Princess Maria Laura, Archduchess of Austria-Este (b. 1988)
      - (11) Albert Isvy (b. 2025)
    - (12) Prince Joachim, Archduke of Austria-Este (b. 1991)
    - (13) Princess Luisa Maria, Archduchess of Austria-Este (b. 1995)
    - (14) Princess Laetitia Maria, Archduchess of Austria-Este (b. 2003)
  - (15) Prince Laurent (b. 1963)
    - (16) Princess Louise (b. 2004)
    - (17) Prince Nicolas (b. 2005)
    - (18) Prince Aymeric (b. 2005)

== See also ==
- List of Belgian monarchs
- Lists of incumbents

== Bibliography ==
The Belgian Constitution, coordinated version 1994 including later revisions (in French)
