= Prince Laurent of Belgium =

Belgian prince (born 1963)

Prince Laurent
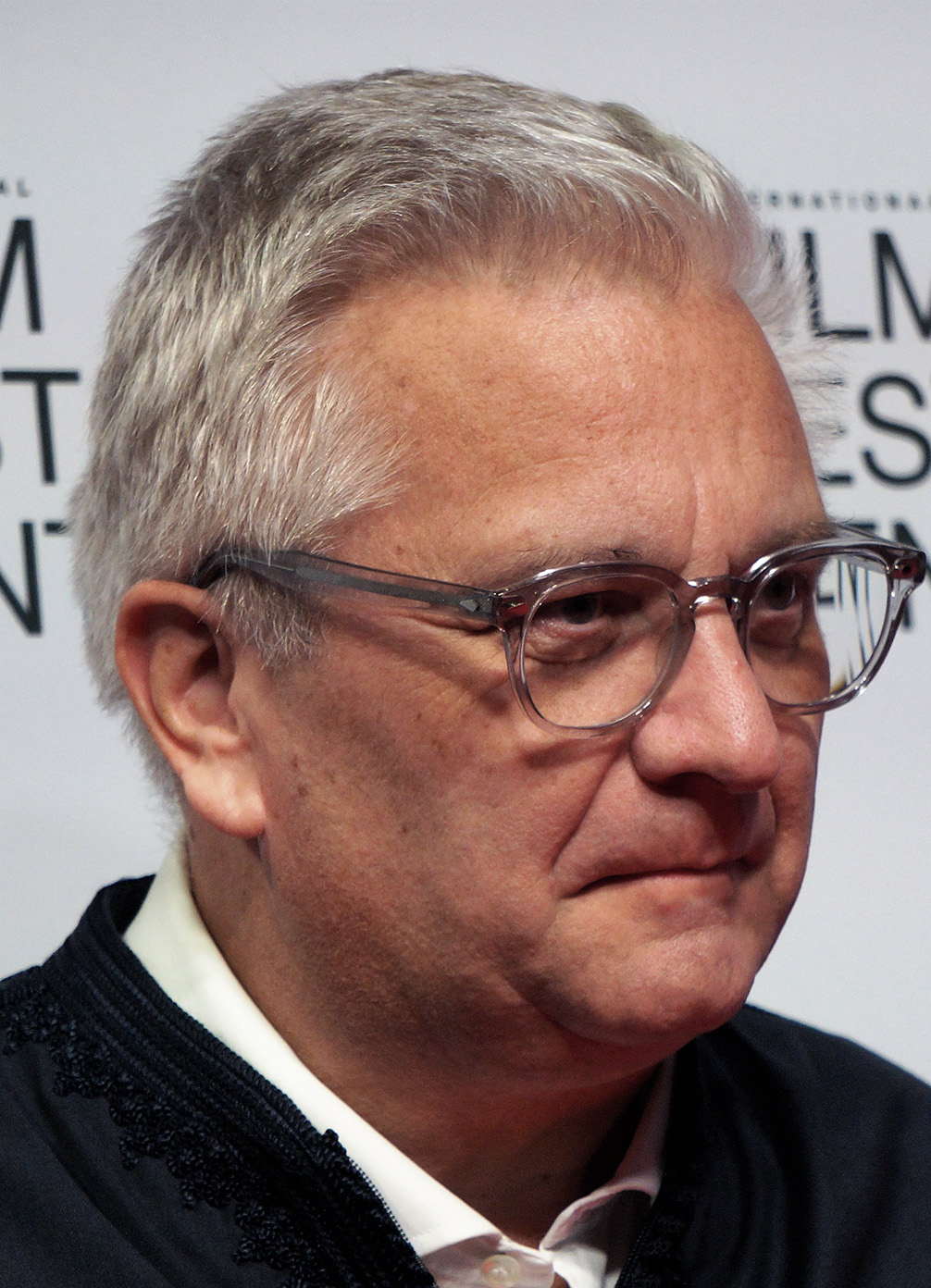
- Prince Laurent in 2021
- Born: 19 October 1963 (age 62); Belvédère Château, Laeken, Brussels, Belgium
- Spouse: Claire Coombs (m. 2003)
- Issue: Prince Clément; Princess Louise; Prince Nicolas; Prince Aymeric
Names
- Laurent Benoît Baudouin Marie de Saxe-Cobourg (Note: For almost a hundred years, official documents of the Belgian royal family members indicate "de Belgique/van België" as their surname. In January 2023, La Libre Belgique reported that members of the Belgian royal family were asked to go to the municipal administration to change their identity papers and write "de Saxe-Cobourg/van Saksen-Coburg" as their surname instead of the name "de Belgique/van België". He uses the Dutch version of his surname in his official papers as a resident of Tervuren, a Flemish municipality. He uses the French version of his surname on some papers.)
- House: Belgium
- Father: Albert II of Belgium
- Mother: Paola Ruffo di Calabria

Prince Laurent of Belgium (Laurent Benoît Baudouin Marie de Saxe-Cobourg; born 19 October 1963) is the second son and youngest child of King Albert II and Queen Paola, and younger brother of King Philippe. Currently, he is 15th in the Belgian line of succession. He had been as high as third in line, but the constitution was amended in 1991 to extend an equal right of succession to women, putting him behind his sister, Princess Astrid, and her descendants.

== Early life and education ==
Prince Laurent was born on 19 October 1963 at the Belvédère Château in Laeken, northern Brussels. He was educated at the Royal Cadet High School and at the Royal Military Academy.

== Marriage and children ==
Prince Laurent and Claire Louise Coombs were married in Brussels on 12 April 2003. Coombs was also given the title of Princess of Belgium upon her marriage. The couple have three children, who are sixteenth, seventeenth and eighteenth in the line of succession to the throne respectively.

- Princess Louise (born 6 February 2004)
- Prince Nicolas (born 13 December 2005, twin with Aymeric)
- Prince Aymeric (born 13 December 2005, twin with Nicolas)

Prince Laurent also had a child out of wedlock with actress and singer Iris Vandenkerckhove (born 6 February 1960), better known as Wendy Van Wanten, whom he publicly recognised on 9 September 2025 and formally brought into the royal family:

- Prince Clément Vandenkerckhove (born 16 August 2000)

The family live in Villa Clémentine, in Tervuren.

Prince Laurent is also a godfather to Princess Maria Carolina of Bourbon-Two Sicilies, the daughter of Prince Carlo, Duke of Castro, a current pretender to the former throne of Two Sicilies and his wife, Princess Camilla, Duchess of Castro.

== Alleged corruption scandal ==
In December 2006, Prince Laurent's name surfaced in a corruption scandal in which funds of the Belgian Navy were spent on his residence (Villa Clémentine) in Tervuren. Although the investigating magistrates denied that Laurent was personally implicated, some of the accused have implicated the prince in the press.

On 5 January 2007, it became known that King Albert II had signed a royal decree, making it possible for Laurent to be called up as a witness in the corruption trial which was to start 8 January. One of the defendants immediately used this to subpoena the prince. During the evening of 8 January, Prince Laurent was interrogated by federal police, appearing in court the following day where he testified at the trial that he had no reason to believe the funding of his renovations could be illegal.

Media reports in March 2007 suggested that Laurent was no longer welcome at the Royal Palace, possibly due to his role in the corruption scandal.

In March 2011, the prince visited the former Belgian colony of the Congo without receiving the required permission; the reported purpose of the visit was to promote awareness of deforestation. As a result, on 9 April he accepted conditions laid down by Belgian Prime Minister Yves Leterme regarding his future activities; had he not done so, the matter of his annual appanage would have been in question.

== Finances ==
In 2025, Prince Laurent filed a petition asking that he be allowed to avail of social security benefits apart from his royal stipend, saying that he is self-employed as a royal and citing his work running an animal welfare charity. The petition was denied by a court in Brussels on 7 April 2025, which ruled that he cannot be considered as either self-employed or an employee.

== Health ==
In March 2014, Prince Laurent was hospitalised with pneumonia and depression. He was voluntarily placed in a medically-induced coma on March 25, and was awakened on 27 March. On 4 April, Queen Paola stated in a letter that Laurent's condition was improving, and that she felt he was 'the most vulnerable' of her three children.

== Titles, styles and honours ==
Styles of Prince Laurent of Belgium
- Reference style: His Royal Highness

- His Royal Highness Prince Laurent of Belgium

Prince Laurent does not hold a personal title as younger princes were previously accustomed to receive in the past (such as Count of Flanders or Prince of Liège).

=== Honours ===
==== National ====
- Belgium:
  - Grand Cordon of the Order of Leopold

==== Foreign ====
- Germany:
  - Grand Cross 1st Class of the Order of Merit of the Federal Republic of Germany
- Hungary:
  - Grand Cross of the Order of Merit of the Republic of Hungary
- Sovereign Military Order of Malta:
  - Knight Grand Cross of Honour and Devotion of the Sovereign Military Order of Malta
- Luxembourg:
  - Grand Cross of the Order of Adolphe of Nassau
- Netherlands:
  - Grand Cross of the Order of the Crown
- Norway:
  - Grand Cross of the Order of Merit
- Portugal:
  - Grand Cross of the Order of Prince Henry
- Spain:
  - Knight Grand Cross of the Order of Civil Merit
- Sweden:
  - Commander Grand Cross of the Royal Order of the Polar Star

==== Dynastic orders ====
- (Kingdom of the Two Sicilies) Two Sicilian Royal Family:
  - Knight Grand Cross of Justice of the Two Sicilian Royal Sacred Military Constantinian Order of Saint George

== Military ranks ==
- 1983–1986 : Royal Military Academy, 123rd promotion TAW ("All Weapons" Faculty)
- (Belgium) September 1985 – September 1989 : Belgian Navy, ensign 2nd class
  (Enseigne de vaisseau de 2ème classe/ Vaandrig-ter-zee 2de klasse)
  - Officer oath on 30 October 1985
  - Specialization: combat diver and helicopter pilot
  - Combat diver badge: 20 July 1989 in Bruges handed by his father, divisional admiral
- (Belgium) September 1989 – 15 November 1994 : Belgian Navy, ship-of-the-line lieutenant (Lieutenant de vaisseau)
  - helicopter pilot badge handed in 1990 by his uncle King Baudouin
- (Belgium) 15 November 1994 – 26 June 2004 : Belgian Navy, frigate captain (Capitaine de frégate)
- (Belgium) 26 June 2004 – : Belgian Navy, ship-of-the-line captain (Capitaine de vaisseau)

1985	1989	1994	2004

Source : www.monarchie.be, Prince Laurent

== Arms ==
Coat of arms of Prince Laurent of Belgium
Notes As a Prince of Belgium and a descendant of King Leopold I, the Prince is entitled to use a coat of arms which was stipulated in the Royal Decree of King Philippe in 2019. Adopted 12 July 2019 Coronet Princely crown of Belgium Escutcheon Sable, a lion rampant or, armed and langued gules (Belgium), on the shoulder an escutcheon barry of ten sable and or, a crancelin vert (Wettin), overall a bordure or. Supporters Two lions guardant proper Motto French: L'union fait la force Dutch: Eendracht maakt macht German: Einigkeit macht stark Other elements The whole is placed on a mantle purpure with ermine lining, fringes and tassels or and ensigned with the Royal crown of Belgium.

== Footnotes ==
Prince Laurent of Belgium House of Saxe-Coburg and Gotha Born: 19 October 1963
Lines of succession
Preceded by Princess Laetitia Maria	Succession to the Belgian throne 15th in line	Succeeded by Princess Louise
