= E. Gutzwiller & Cie. Banquiers =

- Native name: E. Gutzwiller & Cie, Banquiers
- Industry: Bank
- Founded: 1886
- Headquarters: Kaufhausgasse 7, 4051 Basel, Switzerland
- Website: www.gutzwiller.ch

E. Gutzwiller & Cie. Banquiers is one of the oldest Swiss banks located in Basel. It is a private bank specializing in asset management. It was founded in 1886 by Carl Gutzwiller and is a founding member of the Basel Stock Exchange. Today the bank remains largely in the hands of the Gutzwiller family.

Gutzwiller has representations in Geneva (Gutzwiller SA) and since 2004 also in Zürich (Gutzwiller Partner AG). The bank specializes in the asset management and investment advisory for private clients. Gutzwiller also offers investment funds via its subsidiary Gutzwiller Fonds Management AG.

The family business is now in 4th generation and employs about 60 people.

== Leadership ==
Leadership Members are as follows.

=== Managing Partners ===
- Mr. François Gutzwiller
- Mr. Stéphane Gutzwiller
- Mr. François Boulte
- HRH Prince Amedeo, Archduke of Austria

=== Directors/Limited Partners ===
- HRH Prince Lorenz, the Archduke of Austria-Este
- Mr. Peter Handschin
- Dr. Philip Baumann
- Mr. Christoph Gloor
- Dr. Urs Gloor

=== Chief Operating Officer ===
- Mr. Adrian F. Strub
