= Princess Eléonore of Belgium =

Belgian princess (born 2008)

Princess Eléonore
- Born: 16 April 2008 (age 18); Erasmus Hospital, Anderlecht, Brussels, Belgium
Names
- French: Eléonore Fabiola Victoria Anne Marie; German: Eleonore Fabiola Viktoria Anne Marie or (Anna Maria)
- House: Belgium
- Father: Philippe of Belgium
- Mother: Mathilde d'Udekem d'Acoz
- Education: St John Berchmans College; International School of Brussels

Princess Eléonore of Belgium (Eléonore Fabiola Victoria Anne Marie; born 16 April 2008) is the younger daughter and the youngest of four children of King Philippe and Queen Mathilde of Belgium. She is currently fourth in line to the throne of Belgium after her older siblings Princess Elisabeth, Duchess of Brabant, Prince Gabriel, and Prince Emmanuel.

== Life ==
Eléonore was born as the fourth child of Philippe and Mathilde, then the duke and duchess of Brabant. She was delivered at 4:50 CET on 16 April 2008 at Erasmus Hospital, the teaching hospital of the Université libre de Bruxelles in Anderlecht, Brussels. She is the twelfth and youngest grandchild of King Albert II and Queen Paola. She was christened on 14 June 2008 at Ciergnon Castle, a summer residence of the Belgian royal family, by Cardinal Godfried Danneels, then Archbishop of Mechelen-Brussels. Her godparents are Crown Princess Victoria of Sweden, Eléonore's aunt Princess Claire of Belgium, and Count Sébastien von Westphalen zu Fürstenberg.

Princess Eléonore was initially educated at St John Berchmans College, a Dutch-language school in the Marolles/Marollen, Brussels. In September 2020, she was transferred to the Heilig Hart College, a Dutch-language secondary school in Wezembeek-Oppem. From September 2023, she attended the International School of Brussels, from which she graduated in 2026.

Princess Eléonore speaks Dutch, French and English. She plays the violin and practices skiing, sailing, and tennis.

== Arms ==
Coat of arms of Princess Eléonore of Belgium
Notes As a Princess of Belgium and a descendant of King Leopold I, the Princess is entitled to use a coat of arms which was stipulated in the Royal Decree of King Philippe in 2019. Adopted 12 July 2019 Coronet Princely crown of Belgium Escutcheon On a lozenge, sable, a lion rampant or, armed and langued gules (Belgium), on the shoulder an escutcheon barry of ten sable and or, a crancelin vert (Wettin), overall a bordure or. Supporters Two lions guardant proper Motto French: L'union fait la force Dutch: Eendracht maakt macht German: Einigkeit macht stark Other elements The whole is placed on a mantle purpure with ermine lining, fringes and tassels or and ensigned with the Royal crown of Belgium.

Princess Eléonore of Belgium House of Saxe-Coburg and Gotha Born: 16 April 2008
Lines of succession
Preceded by Prince Emmanuel of Belgium	Line of succession to the Belgian throne 4th position	Succeeded by The Archduchess of Austria-Este
