= Philippe of Belgium =

King of the Belgians since 2013

Philippe
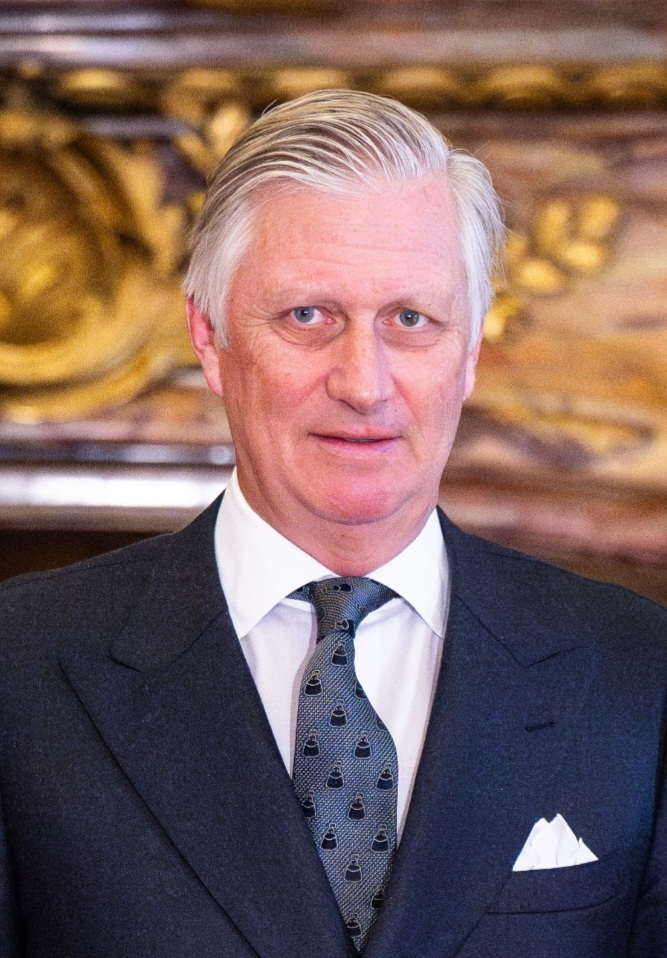
- Philippe in 2025

King of the Belgians
- Reign: 21 July 2013 – present
- Predecessor: Albert II
- Heir apparent: Princess Elisabeth
- Born: 15 April 1960 (age 66); Belvédère Château, Brussels, Belgium
- Spouse: Mathilde d'Udekem d'Acoz (m. 1999)
- Issue Detail: Princess Elisabeth, Duchess of Brabant; Prince Gabriel; Prince Emmanuel; Princess Eléonore
Names
- French: Philippe Léopold Louis Marie; Dutch: Filip(s) Leopold Louis Marie
- House: Belgium
- Father: Albert II
- Mother: Paola Ruffo di Calabria

Philippe Léopold Louis Marie (Note: French: Philippe Léopold Louis Marie [filip leɔpɔld lwi maʁi]; Dutch: Filip Leopold Lodewijk Maria [ˈfilɪp ˈleːjoːpɔlt ˈloːdəʋɛik maːˈrijaː]) (born 15 April 1960) is King of the Belgians, reigning since 21 July 2013.

He is the eldest child of King Albert II and Queen Paola. He succeeded his father upon the former's abdication for health reasons on 21 July 2013. He married Mathilde d'Udekem d'Acoz in 1999, with whom he has four children. Their eldest child, Princess Elisabeth, is first in the line of succession.

== Early life and education ==
Philippe was born on 15 April 1960 at the Belvédère Château in Laeken, northern Brussels. His father, Prince Albert, Prince of Liège (later King Albert II), was the second son of King Leopold III and a younger brother of Baudouin. His mother, Paola, Princess of Liège (later Queen Paola), is a daughter of the Italian aristocrat Fulco VIII, Prince Ruffo di Calabria, 6th Duke of Guardia Lombarda. His mother descends from the French House of La Fayette, and the king is a descendant of Gilbert du Motier, Marquis de Lafayette, and Marie Adrienne Françoise de Noailles. Philippe was baptised one month later at the Church of St. James on Coudenberg in Brussels on 17 May, and named Philippe after his great-great-grandfather Prince Philippe, Count of Flanders. His godparents were his paternal grandfather, King Leopold III, and his maternal grandmother, Donna Luisa, Princess Ruffo di Calabria.

Albert and Paola's marriage was unhappy, and they were usually absent from Philippe's life. The child neglect was so severe that child psychiatrist Peter Adriaenssens described it as "something that would justify intervention by social workers".

Philippe has a half-sibling, Princess Delphine of Belgium (born 1968). He was also a fifth cousin of Elizabeth II of the United Kingdom since they share a common ancestor, Francis (he was the grandfather of Queen Victoria and Albert, Prince Consort and one of his sons, Leopold I would become the first King of the Belgians). Queen Elizabeth II and King Philippe had been 3rd cousins once removed through King Christian IX of Denmark.

As a child the future king was required to move from a French-language school which he liked to a secondary school in Flanders, where he found it difficult to make friends. "In my youth, I had many problems at school", Philippe told teenage dropouts in 2019. "I felt badly treated. It was not easy for me". From 1978 to 1981, Philippe was educated at the Belgian Royal Military Academy in the 118th "Promotion Toutes Armes" (Promotion All Weapons). On 26 September 1980, he was appointed second lieutenant and took the officer's oath.

Philippe continued his education at Trinity College, Oxford, and he attended graduate school at Stanford University, California, where he graduated in 1985 with an MA degree in political science. He obtained his fighter pilot's wings and his certificates as a parachutist and a commando. In 1989, he attended a series of special sessions at the Royal Higher Defence Institute. The same year, he was promoted to colonel. In 1993, King Baudouin died in Spain, Albert became the new king, and Philippe became the new heir apparent, titled Duke of Brabant. On 25 March 2001, Philippe was appointed to the rank of major-general in the Land Component and the Air Component and to the rank of rear-admiral in the Naval Component.

== Marriage ==
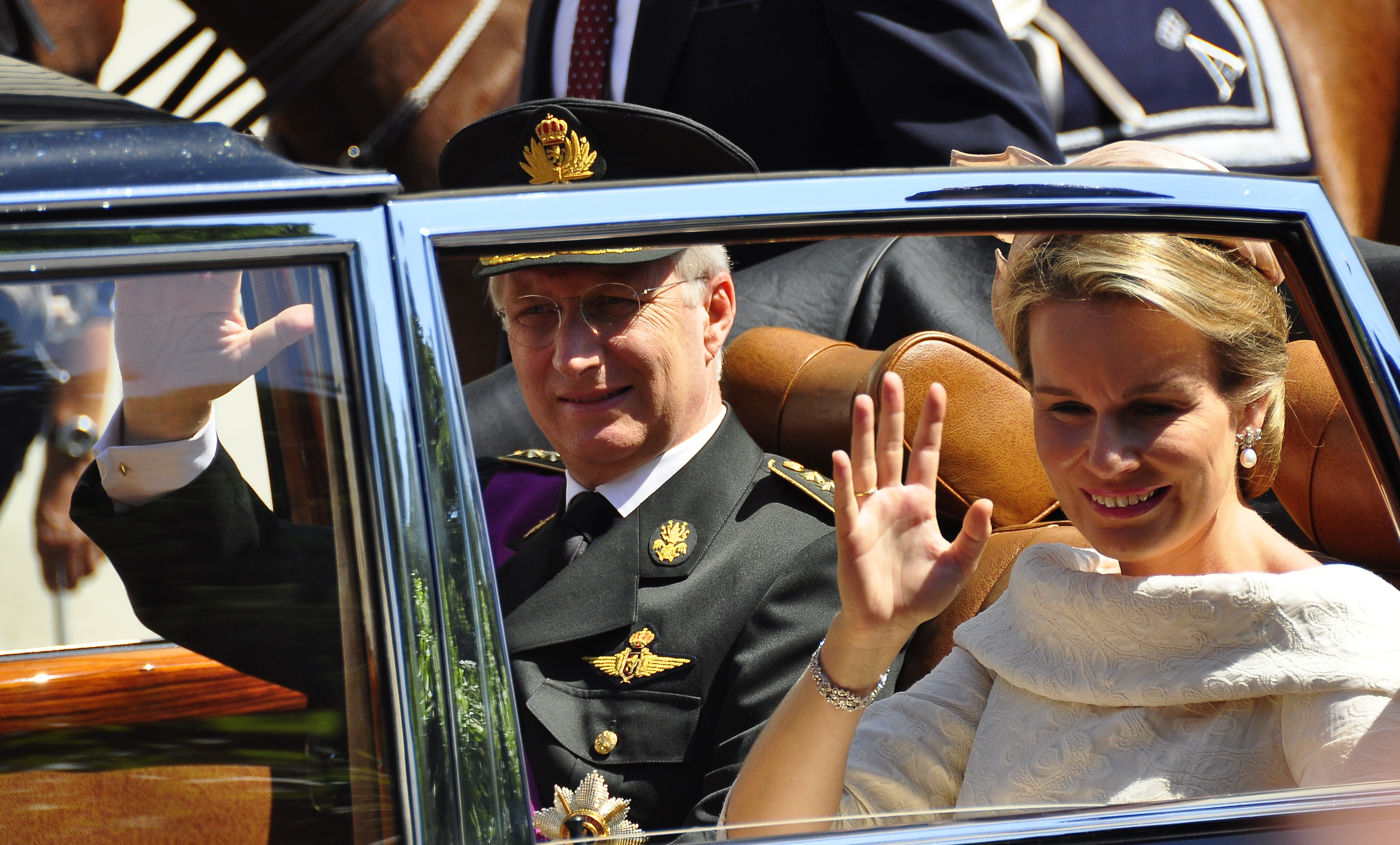
King Philippe and Queen Mathilde wave to crowds in Brussels after his swearing in as the new Belgian monarch.

Philippe married Mathilde d'Udekem d'Acoz, daughter of a Walloon count of a Belgian noble family and female line descendant of Polish noble families such as the princes Sapieha and counts Komorowski, on 4 December 1999 in Brussels, in a civil ceremony at the Brussels Town Hall and a religious ceremony at the Cathedral of Saint Michel and Saint Gudule in Brussels. They have four children who were all born at Erasmus Hospital in Anderlecht, Brussels:

- Princess Elisabeth (born 25 October 2001)
- Prince Gabriel (born 20 August 2003)
- Prince Emmanuel (born 4 October 2005)
- Princess Eléonore (born 16 April 2008)

== Foreign trade ==
On 6 August 1993, the government named Philippe as honorary chairman of the Belgian Foreign Trade Board (BFTB). He succeeded his father, who had been honorary chairman of the BFTB since 1962. On 3 May 2003, he was appointed honorary chairman of the board of the Foreign Trade Agency, replacing the BFTB.

In this capacity, Philippe has headed more than 60 economic missions. Upon his accession as seventh King of the Belgians, this role was taken over by his sister Princess Astrid.

== Reign ==
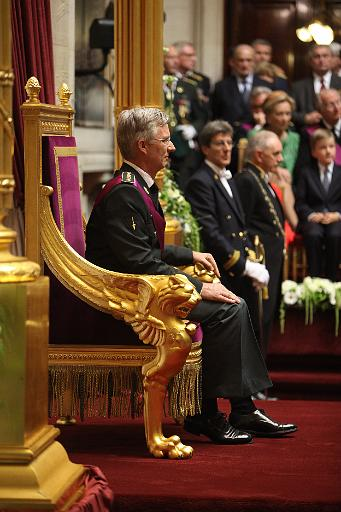
King Philippe during the swearing-in ceremony at the Palace of the Nation, 21 July 2013.

King Albert II announced on 3 July 2013 that he would abdicate in favour of Philippe on 21 July 2013. Approximately one hour after King Albert II's abdication, Prince Philippe was sworn in as King of the Belgians. His eldest child, Princess Elisabeth, became his heir apparent and is expected to become Belgium's first queen regnant.

Philippe played a role in forming a coalition government after the 2014 Belgian federal election. Political meetings with the King were moved from the Palace of Laeken to the Royal Palace of Brussels. In May 2019, Philippe met with Vlaams Belang President Tom Van Grieken, the first time the party had received a royal audience.

In 2020, Philippe announced regret for the "acts of violence and cruelty" committed in the Congo Free State under the rule of his great-great-granduncle King Leopold II.

In September 2024, Philippe, along with Belgian Prime Minister Alexander De Croo publicly criticised Pope Francis during their welcome addresses for him over sexual abuses committed by the Roman Catholic Church in Belgium.

In a speech on the eve of national day on 21 July 2025, Philippe described the war in Gaza as a disgrace to humanity and said: "I join all those who denounce the serious humanitarian violations in Gaza, where innocent people are starving and being killed by bombs while trapped in their enclaves. The current situation has gone on for far too long. It is a disgrace for all humanity. We support the UN Secretary General's call for an immediate end to this intolerable crisis.

== Honours and arms ==
Personal Standard of Philippe, King of the Belgians

=== National honours ===
- Grand Master of the Order of Leopold (21 July 2013)
- Grand Master of the Order of the African Star (21 July 2013)
- Grand Master of the Royal Order of the Lion (21 July 2013)
- Grand Master of the Order of the Crown (21 July 2013)
- Grand Master of the Order of Leopold II (21 July 2013)

=== Foreign honours ===
- Argentina: Grand Cross of the Order of the Liberator General San Martín (6 May 1994)
- Austria: Grand Star of the Decoration of Honour for Services to the Republic of Austria (21 March 2022)
- Bolivia: Grand Cross of the Order of the Condor of the Andes (9 September 1996)
- Czech Republic: I Class with collar of the Order of the White Lion (5 May 2025)
- Denmark: Knight of the Order of the Elephant (28 May 2002)
- Finland: Grand Cross of the Order of the White Rose of Finland (30 March 2004)
- France: Grand Cross of the National Order of the Legion of Honour (6 February 2014)
- Germany: Grand Cross Special Class of the Order of Merit of the Federal Republic of Germany (6 March 2016)
- Greece:
  - Grand Cross of the Order of the Redeemer (2 May 2022)
  - Grand Cross of the Order of Honour (1 February 2005)
- Holy See: Knight of the Collar of the Order of the Holy Sepulchre (17 November 2015)
- Hungary: Grand Cross of the Order of Merit of the Republic of Hungary (18 April 2008)
- Italy: Knight Grand Cross with Collar of the Order of Merit of the Italian Republic (25 October 2021)
- Japan: Collar and Grand Cordon of the Supreme Order of the Chrysanthemum (9 October 2016)
- Jordan: Collar of the Order of al-Hussein bin Ali (18 May 2016)
- Lithuania: Grand Cross with Golden Chain of the Order of Vytautas the Great (24 October 2022)
- Luxembourg: Knight of the Order of the Gold Lion of the House of Nassau (15 March 1999)
- Netherlands:
  - Knight Grand Cross of the Order of the Netherlands Lion (28 November 2016)
  - Knight Grand Cross of the Order of Orange-Nassau (6 May 1993)
  - Recipient of the King Willem-Alexander Inauguration Medal (30 April 2013)
- Norway: Grand Cross of the Order of St. Olav (20 May 2003)
- Oman:
  - Collar of the Order of Al-Said (3 December 2024)
  - Member Special Class of the Order of Oman (3 February 2022)
- Poland:
  - Knight of the Order of the White Eagle (13 October 2015)
  - Grand Cross of the Order of Merit of the Republic of Poland (18 October 2004)
- Portugal:
  - Grand Collar of the Order of Prince Henry (22 October 2018)
  - Grand Cross of the Military Order of Christ (18 October 2005)
  - Grand Cross of the Military Order of Aviz (18 September 1997)
- Spain: Knight Grand Cross of the Order of Isabella the Catholic (16 May 2000)
- Sweden:
  - Knight of the Royal Order of the Seraphim (7 May 2001)
  - Recipient of the 50th Birthday Badge Medal of King Carl XVI Gustaf (30 April 1996)
  - Recipient of the 70th Birthday Badge Medal of King Carl XVI Gustaf (30 April 2016)
- Turkey: Member of the Order of the State of Republic of Turkey (4 October 2015)

=== Arms ===
Coat of arms of Philippe of Belgium
Notes In 2019 the king codified the coats of arms of himself and those of his family through a Royal Decree. The arms of the reigning monarch was modified to include the Saxonian escutcheon. The arms of other members of the royal family was similarly modified. The reinstatement of the shield of Saxe-Coburg-Gotha into the royal arms occurred shortly after the visit of the king and queen to the ancestral Friedenstein Castle. The latest royal decree therefore reverses previous changes made to the Royal versions of the coat arms which removed the armorial bearings of Saxony during the First World War. By including the three official languages in the motto it reflects his wish "to be the King of the whole Kingdom and of all Belgians". Adopted 12 July 2019 Coronet Royal crown of Belgium Helm A golden royal helm with the visor open Escutcheon Sable, a lion rampant or, armed and langued gules (Belgium), on the shoulder an escutcheon barry of ten sable and or, a crancelin vert (Wettin), with two crossed sceptres (a hand of justice and a lion) or behind a shield. Supporters Two lions guardant proper each supporting a lance or with two National Flags of Belgium (Tierced per pale Sable, Or and Gules). Motto French: L'union fait la force Dutch: Eendracht maakt macht German: Einigkeit macht stark Orders Order of Leopold Other elements The whole is placed on a mantle purpure with ermine lining, fringes and tassels or and ensigned with the Royal crown of Belgium. Previous versions Previously as monarch, Philippe used the royal coat of arms of Belgium undifferenced.

== See also ==
- Succession to the Belgian throne
- Prince Philippe Fund

== Notes ==
Philippe of Belgium House of Saxe-Coburg and Gotha Born: 15 April 1960
Belgian royalty
Vacant Title last held by Baudouin	Duke of Brabant; 1993–2013	Succeeded by Elisabeth
Regnal titles
Preceded by Albert II	King of the Belgians; 2013–present	Incumbent; Heir apparent: Elisabeth
