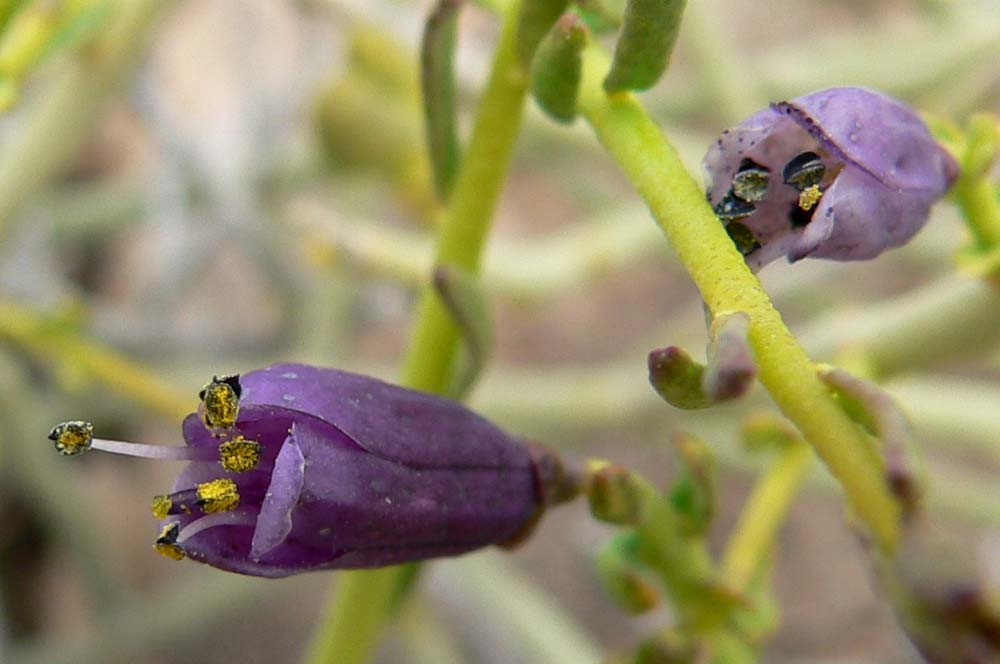
- Thamnosma montana

Scientific classification
- Kingdom: Plantae
- Clade: Tracheophytes
- Clade: Angiosperms
- Clade: Eudicots
- Clade: Rosids
- Order: Sapindales
- Family: Rutaceae
- Subfamily: Rutoideae
- Genus: Thamnosma; Torr. & Frém.

Species
- See text.

Synonyms
- Rutosma A.Gray

= Thamnosma =

Genus of plants

Thamnosma is a genus of flowering plants in the rue family, Rutaceae. Plants in this genus are sometimes known by the common name desertrue.

== Selected species ==
- Thamnosma africana — Sandboegoe
- Thamnosma montana Torr. & Frém. — Turpentinebroom, Mojave desert rue
- Thamnosma socotrana Balf.f.
- Thamnosma somalensis Thulin
- Thamnosma texana (Gray) Torr. — Texas desert rue
