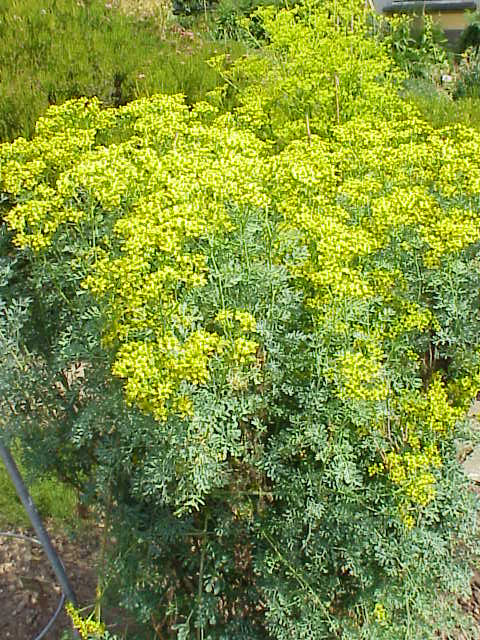
- Ruta chalepensis

Scientific classification
- Kingdom: Plantae
- Clade: Tracheophytes
- Clade: Angiosperms
- Clade: Eudicots
- Clade: Rosids
- Order: Sapindales
- Family: Rutaceae
- Subfamily: Rutoideae; Arn.

Genera
- See text.
- Range of subfamily Rutoideae sensu lato

= Rutoideae =

Subfamily of flowering plants

Rutoideae is a flowering plant subfamily in the family Rutaceae. The subfamily has had varying circumscriptions. In a 2012 classification of the family it was one of only two subfamilies and contained most of the genera, whereas in a 2021 classification it has only five genera.

== Taxonomy ==
In 1896, Engler published a division of the family Rutaceae into seven subfamilies. Rutoideae was one of the larger subfamilies. Engler's division into subfamilies largely relied on the characteristics of the fruit, as did others used until molecular phylogenetic methods were applied, which showed that Rutoideae cannot be clearly differentiated from other members of the family based on fruit. In 2012, Groppo et al. divided Rutaceae into only two subfamilies, a small Cneoroideae, and a greatly enlarged subfamily Rutoideae s.l. with all the remaining genera. A 2014 classification by Morton and Telmer split this circumscription of Rutoideae into a smaller Rutoideae and a much larger Amyridoideae s.l., which contained most of Engler's Rutoideae. A 2021 study by Appelhans et al., which sampled many more genera than earlier studies, found that Morton and Telmer's Rutoideae was paraphyletic. Applehans et al. divided the family into six subfamilies, with their Rutoideae containing only five genera. They considered that a revised classification at the tribal level was not feasible at the time their paper was published.

=== Genera ===
Five genera were placed in Rutoideae in the Appelhans et al. (2021) classification of the Rutaceae into subfamilies:

- Boenninghausenia Rchb. ex Meisn.
- Chloroxylon DC.
- Psilopeganum Hemsl.
- Ruta L.
- Thamnosma Torr. & Frém.
