= Chalepensin =

Names
- IUPAC name 6-(2-Methylbut-3-en-2-yl)furo[3,2-g]chromen-7-one
- Other names Xyloltenin; 3-(α,α-dimethylallyl)psoralen

Identifiers
CAS Number	13164-03-9
3D model (JSmol)	Interactive image
ChEBI	CHEBI:3572
ChEMBL	ChEMBL1333931
ChemSpider	114167
KEGG	C09165
PubChem CID	128834
UNII	TGU8MP93CA
CompTox Dashboard (EPA)	DTXSID90157153
- InChI: InChI=1S/C16H14O3/c1-4-16(2,3)12-8-11-7-10-5-6-18-13(10)9-14(11)19-15(12)17/h4-9H,1H2,2-3H3 Key: FYCCCUNGXGKNJV-UHFFFAOYSA-N
- SMILES: CC(C)(C=C)C1=CC2=C(C=C3C(=C2)C=CO3)OC1=O

Properties
Chemical formula	C_{16}H_{14}O_{3}
Molar mass	254.285 g·mol^{−1}
Melting point	82–83 °C (180–181 °F; 355–356 K)
- Except where otherwise noted, data are given for materials in their standard state (at 25 °C [77 °F], 100 kPa). Infobox references

Chalepensin is a chemical compound of the furanocoumarin class. Originally isolated in 1967 from fringed rue (Ruta chalepensis), from which it derives its name, it has also been found in other plants of the genus Ruta including common rue (Ruta graveolens) and mountain rue (Ruta montana).

== Chemical properties ==
Chalepensin forms colorless crystalline needles with a melting point of 82-83 °C.

== Research ==
Chalepensin has been shown to have antifertility effects in female rats. This may be the result of toxic effects chalepensin has on the ovaries. This antifertility effect may provide some scientific evidence in support of the traditional uses of fringed rue and modern use of rue oil (oil from plants of the genus Ruta) in South America as an abortifacient.

Chalepensis has also been shown to have antibacterial activity against Streptococcus mutans and methicillin-resistant Staphylococcus aureus (MRSA).

== Related compounds ==
Several chemical compounds that have the same core chemical structure as chalepensin are known, including chalepin, rutamarin, 5-methoxychalepensin, and 5,8-dimethoxychalepensin.

Chalepin

Rutamarin

5-Methoxychalepensin

5,8-Dimethoxychalepensin
