= P. sinense =

P. sinense may refer to:

- Primulidium sinense, a synonym for Primula sinensis, a plant species found in China
- Psilopeganum sinense, a flowering plant species
