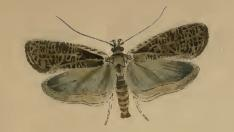

Scientific classification
- Kingdom: Animalia
- Phylum: Arthropoda
- Clade: Pancrustacea
- Class: Insecta
- Order: Lepidoptera
- Family: Depressariidae
- Genus: Agonopterix
- Species: A. rutana

Binomial name
- Agonopterix rutana (Fabricius, 1794)

Synonyms
- Pyralis rutana Fabricius, 1794; Pyralis rutella Fabricius, 1798; Depressaria retiferella Zeller, 1850

= Agonopterix rutana =

Species of moth

Agonopterix rutana is a moth of the family Depressariidae. It is found in southern Europe, Turkey and Israel.

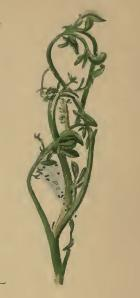
A sprig of Ruta chalepensis attacked by larva

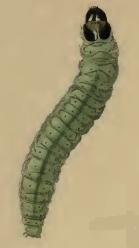
Larva

The larvae have been recorded feeding on Ruta chalepensis.
