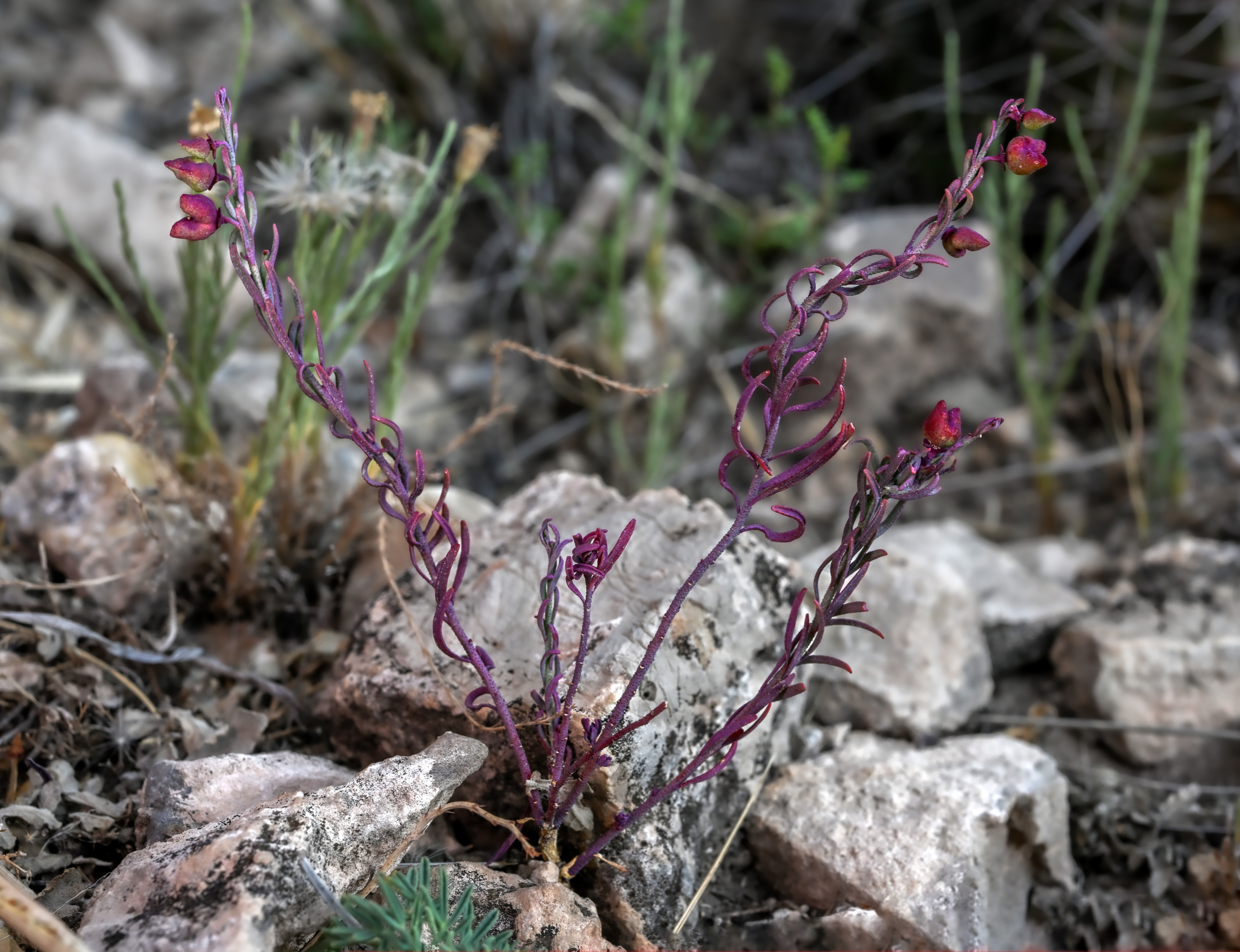

Scientific classification
- Kingdom: Plantae
- Clade: Tracheophytes
- Clade: Angiosperms
- Clade: Eudicots
- Clade: Rosids
- Order: Sapindales
- Family: Rutaceae
- Genus: Thamnosma
- Species: T. texana

Binomial name
- Thamnosma texana (A.Gray) Torr.

= Thamnosma texana =

Species of shrub

Thamnosma texana, the rue of the mountains, Texas desert-rue or Dutchman's breeches, is a shrub in the citrus family Rutaceae. It is native to Arizona (Hualap Mountains) to Texas and Northern Mexico.
