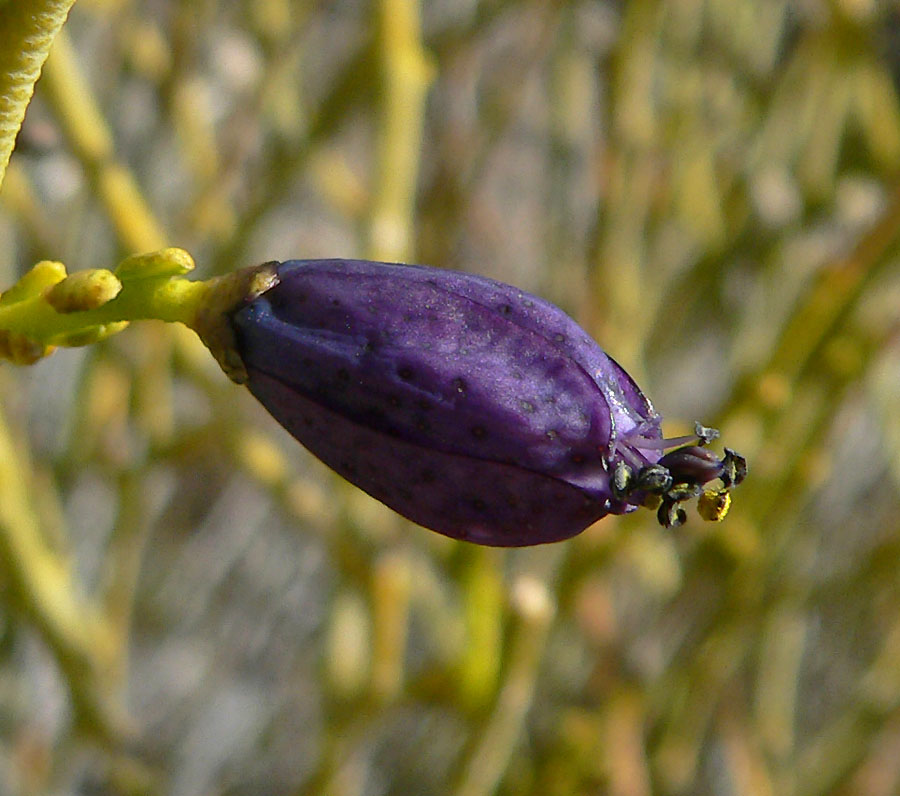

Conservation status
- Secure (NatureServe)

Scientific classification
- Kingdom: Plantae
- Clade: Tracheophytes
- Clade: Angiosperms
- Clade: Eudicots
- Clade: Rosids
- Order: Sapindales
- Family: Rutaceae
- Genus: Thamnosma
- Species: T. montana

Binomial name
- Thamnosma montana Torr. & Frém.

= Thamnosma montana =

Species of plant

Thamnosma montana, the turpentine broom, or Mojave desert-rue, is a shrub in the citrus family Rutaceae. It is native to the deserts of the southwestern United States and northern Mexico. Except immediately after heavy rains, its straight stems usually lack leaves, giving it a broom-like appearance. The Latin specific epithet montana refers to mountains or coming from mountains.

== Description ==
It is a shrub with many infrequently branched, more or less straight, broom-like, yellow-green, 30 to 60 centimeter long stems. It is usually found without leaves except after ground soaking rains, when leaves form and persist for several weeks. Peak flowering is in March, especially in wet years.

== Leaves and stems ==
Stems are speckled with resin glands. Leaves are small and occur only after rains, then fall off (drought deciduous).

== Inflorescence and fruit ==
Flowers occur at intervals along the stem. Each has a greenish base of blunt sepals. The corolla is oval with rounded ends. The petals royal purple in color. Like most other parts of the plant, petals are studded with visible resin glands. The tips of the petals curve outward, revealing a protruding stigma and shorter yellow-tipped stamens.

The fruit is a leathery, yellow-green, gland-spotted capsule with two nearly separate rounded lobes. Within the capsule are pale, kidney-shaped seeds about 4 millimeters long each. The fruits are eaten by animals which then disperse the seeds.

== Range and habitat ==
It grows in dry desert scrub, juniper woodland, and other desert plant communities. It grows among desert plants such as creosote, blackbrush, ephedra, and Yucca species such as Joshua Tree.

== Uses and ecological interactions ==
Native American groups use it as a ceremonial drug, as a medicine, and for other uses.
