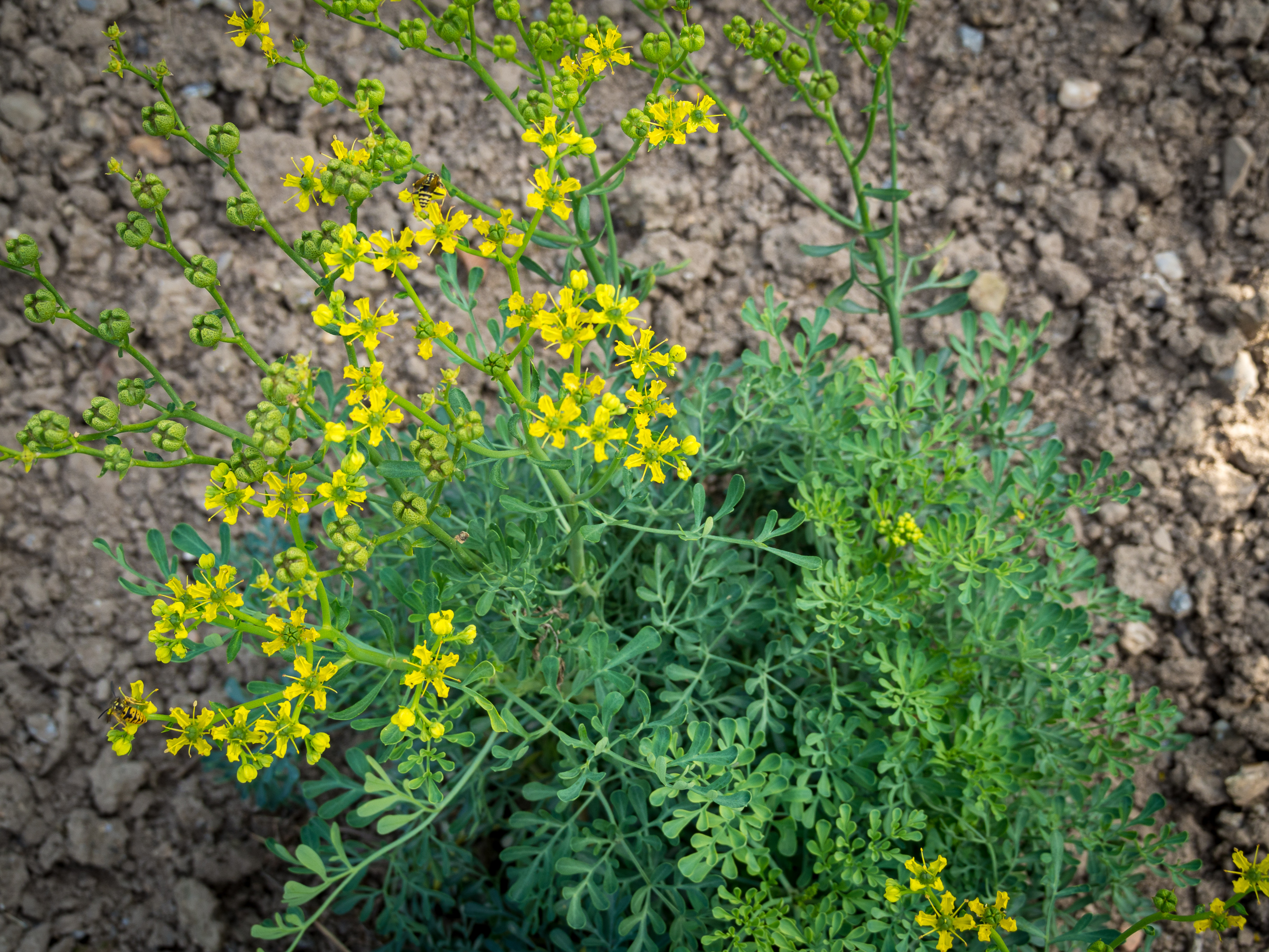
- Common rue in flower

Scientific classification
- Kingdom: Plantae
- Clade: Tracheophytes
- Clade: Angiosperms
- Clade: Eudicots
- Clade: Rosids
- Order: Sapindales
- Family: Rutaceae
- Genus: Ruta
- Species: R. graveolens

Binomial name
- Ruta graveolens L.

= Ruta graveolens =

Common rue

Species of plant

Ruta graveolens, commonly known as rue, common rue, ruda, arruda or herb-of-grace, is a species of the genus Ruta grown as an ornamental plant and herb. It is native to the Mediterranean. It is grown throughout the world in gardens, especially for its bluish leaves, and sometimes for its tolerance of hot and dry soil conditions. It is also cultivated as a culinary herb, and to a lesser extent as an insect repellent and incense.

== Etymology ==
The specific epithet graveolens refers to the strong-smelling leaves.

== Description ==
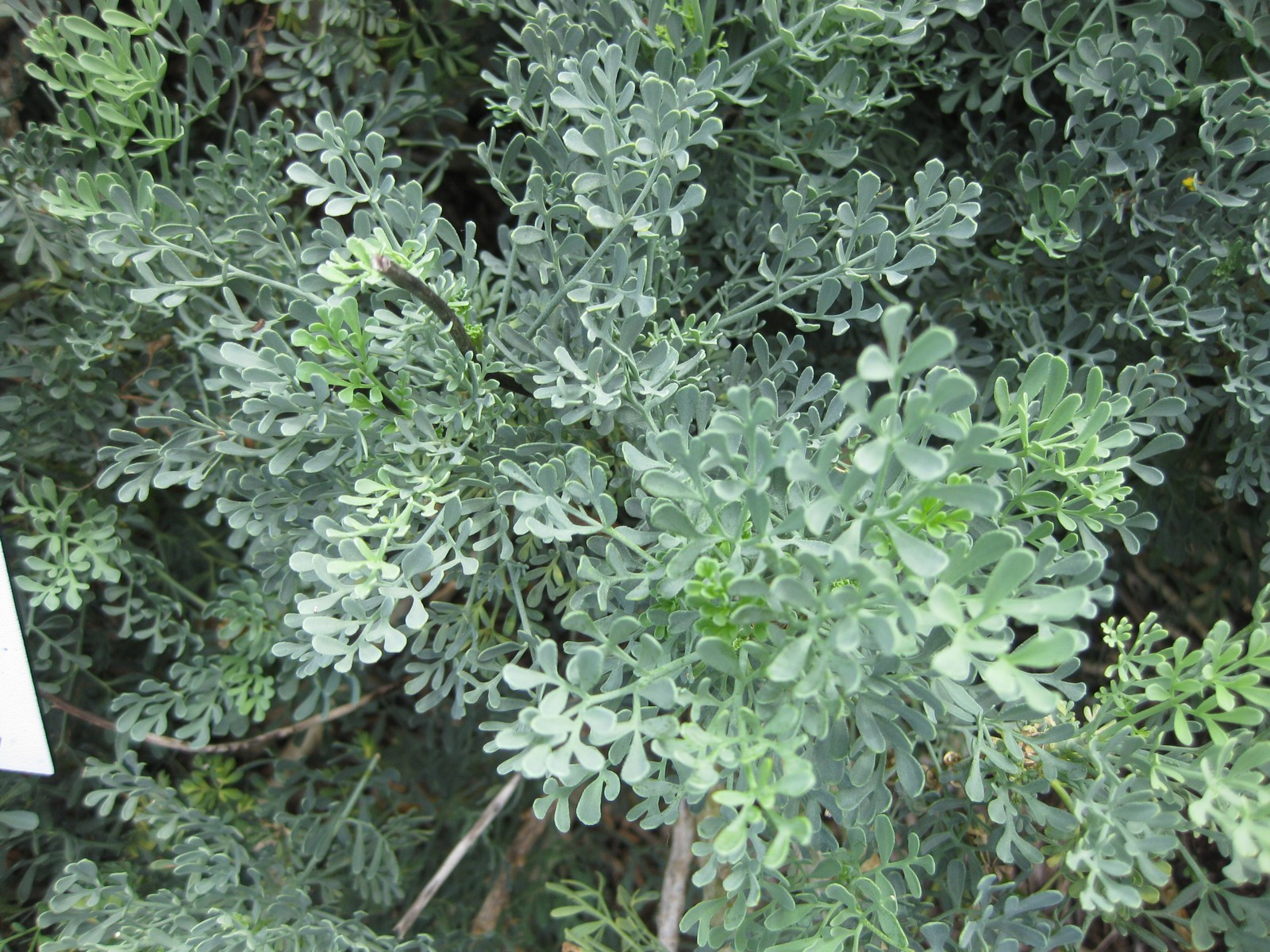
Foliage

Rue is a woody, perennial shrub. Its leaves are oblong, blue green and arranged bipinnately with rounded leaflets; they release a strong aroma when they are bruised.

The flowers are small with 4 to 5 dull yellow petals in cymes. The first flower in each cyme is pentamerous (five sepals, five petals, five stamens and five carpels. All the others are tetramerous (four of each part). They bear brown seed capsules when pollinated.

== Uses ==
=== Traditional use ===
In the ancient Roman world, the naturalists Pedanius Dioscorides and Pliny the Elder recommended that rue be combined with the poisonous shrub oleander to be drunk as an antidote to venomous snake bites.

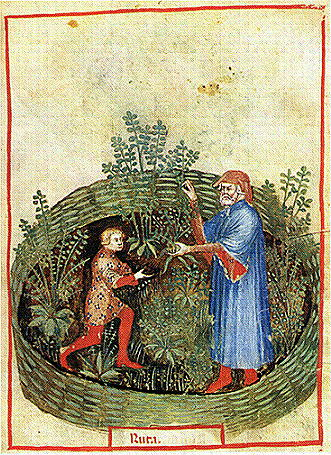
Illustration in the Tacuinum Sanitatis

The refined oil of rue is an emmenagogue and was cited by the Roman historian Pliny the Elder and Soranus as an abortifacient (inducing abortion).

=== Culinary use ===
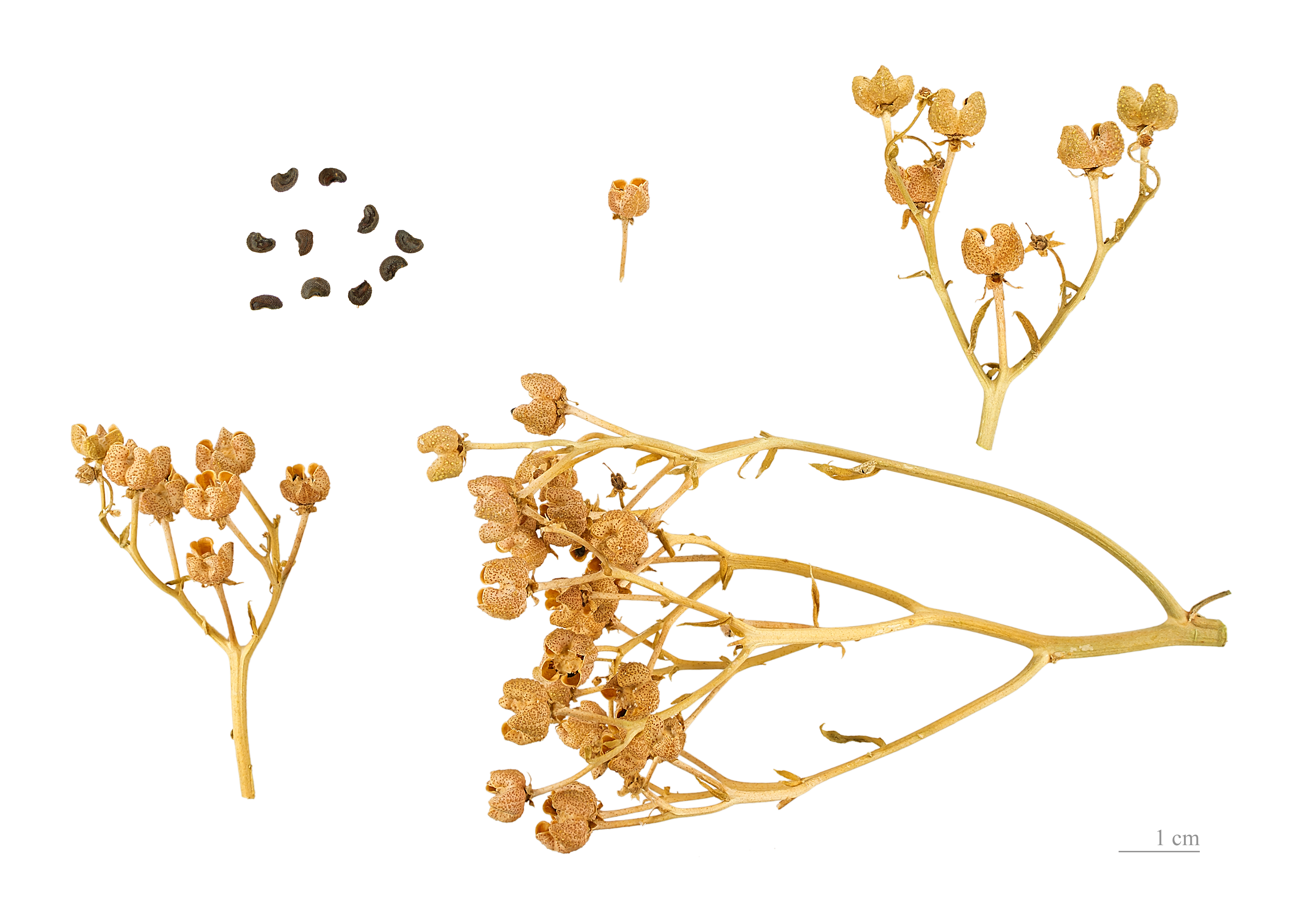
Capsule and seed - MHNT

Rue has a culinary use, but since it is bitter and gastric discomfort may be experienced by some individuals, it is used sparingly. Although used more extensively as a culinary herb in former times, it is not typically found in modern cuisine. Due to small amounts of toxins it contains, it must be used in small amounts, and should be avoided by pregnant women or people who have liver issues.

It has a variety of other culinary uses:

- It was used extensively in ancient Near Eastern and Roman cuisine (according to Ibn Sayyar al-Warraq and Apicius).
- Rue is used as a traditional flavouring in Greece and other Mediterranean countries.
- In Istria (a region spanning Croatia and Slovenia), and in northern Italy, it is used to give a special flavour to grappa/rakia and most of the time a little branch of the plant can be found in the bottle. This is called grappa alla ruta.
- Seeds can be used for porridge.
- The bitter leaf can be added to eggs, cheese, fish, or mixed with damson plums and wine to produce a meat sauce.
- In Italy in Friuli-Venezia Giulia, the young branches of the plant are dipped in a batter, deep-fried in oil, and consumed with salt or sugar. They are also used on their own to aromatise a specific type of omelette.
- Used in Old World beers as flavouring ingredient.
- The rue that is widespread in Ethiopian culture is a different species, R. chalapensis.

=== Other ===
Rue is also grown as an ornamental plant, both as a low hedge and so the leaves can be used in nosegays.

Most cats dislike the smell of it, and it can, therefore, be used as a deterrent to them (see also Plectranthus caninus).

Caterpillars of some subspecies of the butterfly Papilio machaon feed on rue, as well as other plants. The caterpillars of Papilio xuthus also feed readily on it.

It finds many household uses around the world as well. It is traditionally used in Central Asia as an insect repellent and room deodorizer. In premodern East Asia, bookmarks were made from rue in order to drive away bookworms and insects.

=== Purported use against evil ===
The Ruta plant, known locally as arruda, is believed to possess protective qualities against malevolent forces, particularly the evil eye. The same tradition exists among Sephardic Jews, who may place it near vulnerable individuals, such as newborns, children, and mothers, to ward off evil.

Among Sephardic Jews, beyond its symbolic significance, ruda is valued for its supposed uses in folk medicinal. When combined with sugar, it is traditionally used to soothe eye discomfort and alleviate the symptoms of a mild cold. Ruda's significance in Sephardic Jewish culture also extends to religious practices. During Yom Kippur, a Jewish holiday marked by fasting, Sephardic synagogues often pass ruda among congregants to revitalise them.

Beyond the Sephardic tradition, Hasidic Judaism also recognized the protective qualities of ruda. Hasidic Jews also were taught that rue should be placed into amulets to protect them from epidemics and plagues. Other Hasidim rely on the works of Baghdadi Kabbalist Yaakov Chaim Sofer, who makes mention of the plant "ruda" (רודה) as an effective device against both black magic and the evil eye.

== Toxicity ==
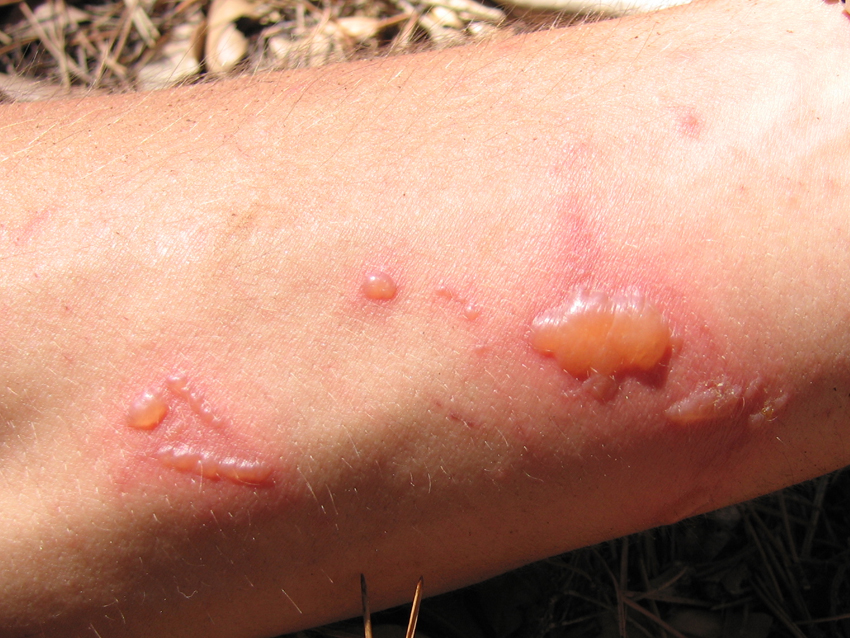
Effect of the common rue on skin in sunny weather

Rue is generally safe if consumed in small amounts as a herb to flavor food. Rue extracts are mutagenic and hepatotoxic. Large doses can cause potentially fatal liver injury. This is due to a variety of toxic compounds in the plant's sap. It is recommended to only use small amounts in food, and to not consume it excessively. It should be strictly avoided by pregnant women, as it is an abortifacient and teratogen. Toxicity with large ingestions can cause multiorgan failure, significant electrolyte derangements and hemodynamic instability requiring hemodialysis. While the specific mechanism of toxicity isn't known, the furanocoumarins chalepensin and psoralen are likely implicated.

Rue can cause photodermatitis of ultraviolet light-exposed skin. Thus exposure to common rue, or herbal preparations derived from it, can cause severe phytophotodermatitis, which results in burn-like blisters on the skin. The mechanism of action is unknown.

== Chemistry ==
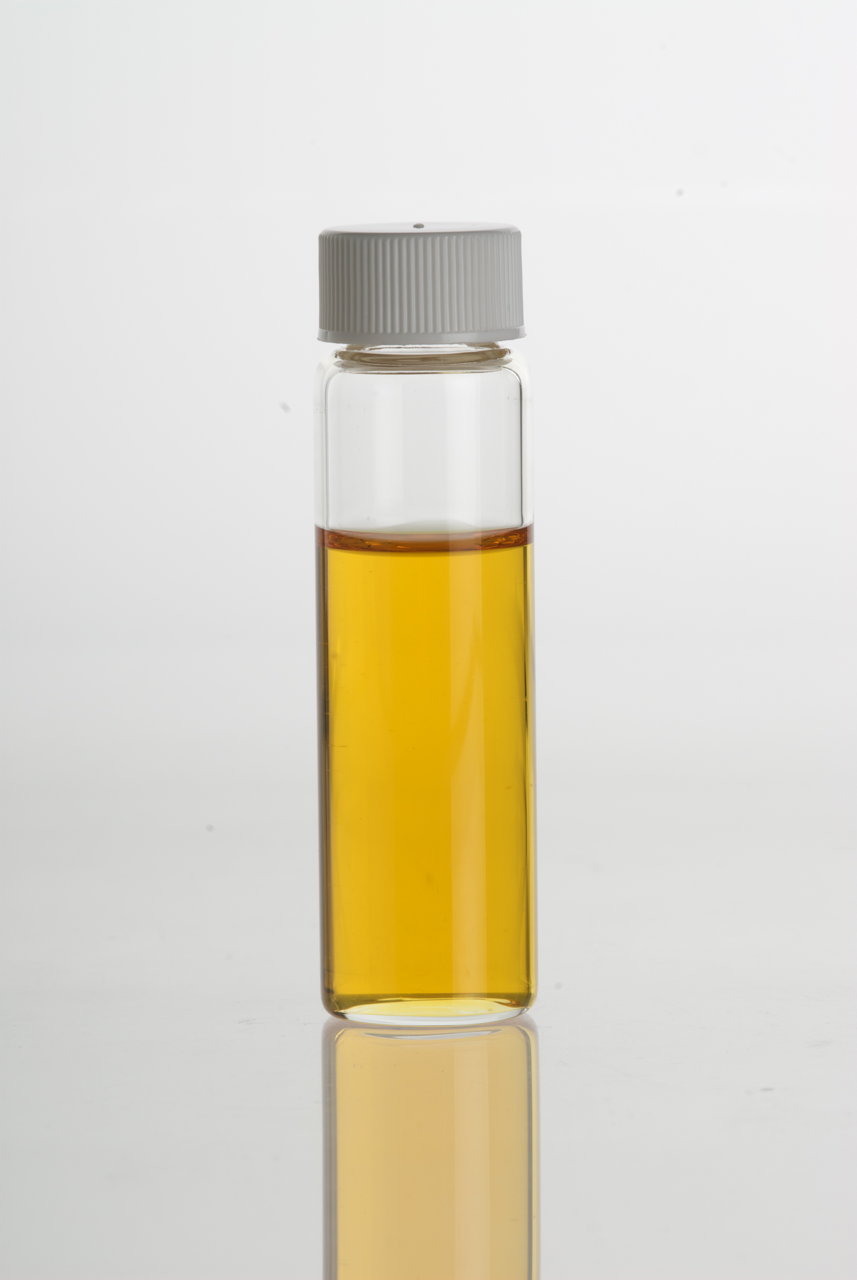
R. graveolens essential oil in a clear glass vial

A series of furanoacridones and two have been isolated from R. graveolens. It also contains coumarins and limonoids.

The ethyl acetate extract of R. graveolens leaves yields two furanocoumarins, one quinoline alkaloid and four quinolone alkaloids.

The essential oil of R. graveolens contains two main constituents, undecan-2-one (46.8%) and nonan-2-one (18.8%).

== Symbolism ==
The bitter taste of its leaves led to rue being associated with the (etymologically unrelated) verb rue "to regret". Rue is well known for its symbolic meaning of regret and it has sometimes been called "herb-of-grace" in literary works. In mythology, the basilisk, whose breath could cause plants to wilt and stones to crack, had no effect on rue. Weasels who were bitten by the basilisk would retreat and eat rue in order to recover and return to fight.

=== In the Bible ===
Rue is mentioned in the New Testament, Luke 11:42:

"But woe unto you, Pharisees! For ye tithe mint and rue and all manner of herbs".

=== In Jewish culture ===
In Sephardic culture, ruda also symbolizes affection and is incorporated into celebratory rituals, such as bridal showers. This symbolism is also featured in the traditional Sephardic song "Una Matica de Ruda", a Ladino ballad. It is a retelling of a 16th-century Spanish ballad, and depicts a conversation between a mother and daughter about love and marriage. The daughter receives a cluster of ruda from a suitor, while the mother warns her of the dangers of new love.

=== In Lithuania ===
Rue is considered a national herb of Lithuania and it is the most frequently referenced herb in Lithuanian folk songs, as an attribute of young girls, associated with virginity and maidenhood. It was common in traditional Lithuanian weddings for only virgins to wear a rue (Lithuanian: rūta) at their wedding, a symbol to show their purity.

=== In Ukraine ===
Likewise, rue is prominent in Ukrainian folklore, songs and culture. In the Ukrainian folk song "Oi poli ruta, ruta" (O, rue, rue in the field), the girl regrets losing her virginity, reproaching the lover for "breaking the green hazel tree". "Chervona Ruta" (Червона Рута—"Red Rue") is a song, written by Volodymyr Ivasyuk, a popular Ukrainian poet and composer. Pop singer Sofia Rotaru performed the song in 1971.

=== In Germany ===
Rue as heraldic charge (Crancelin) is used on the coats of arms of Saxony and Saxony-Anhalt. Until 1918 the King of Saxony have issued the Order of the Rue Crown, the highest order of the Kingdom of Saxony.

=== In Shakespeare ===
It is one of the flowers distributed by the mad Ophelia in William Shakespeare's Hamlet (IV.5):

"There's fennel for you, and columbines:
there's rue for you; and here's some for me:
we may call it herb-grace o' Sundays:
O you must wear your rue with a difference..."

It is used by the clown Lavatch in All's Well That Ends Well (IV.5) to describe Helena and his regret at her apparent death:

"she was the sweet marjoram of the salad, or rather, the herb of grace."

It was planted by the gardener in Richard II to mark the spot where the Queen wept upon hearing news of Richard's capture (III.4.104–105):

"Here did she fall a tear, here in this place
I'll set a bank of rue, sour herb of grace."

It is also given by the rusticated Perdita to her disguised royal father-in-law on the occasion of a sheep-shearing (Winter's Tale, IV.4):

"For you there's rosemary and rue; these keep
Seeming and savour all the winter long."

=== In other English literature ===
It is used by Michael in Milton's Paradise Lost to give Adam clear sight (11.414):

"Then purg'd with euphrasy and rue
The visual nerve, for he had much to see."

Rue is used by Gulliver in Gulliver's Travels (by Jonathan Swift) when he returns to England after living among the Houyhnhnms. Gulliver can no longer stand the smell of the English Yahoos (people), so he stuffs rue or tobacco in his nose to block out the smell.

"I was at last bold enough to walk the street in his (Don Pedro's) company, but kept my nose well with rue, or sometimes with tobacco."

== See also ==
- Crancelin, a heraldic symbol depicting rue
- Ruta chalepensis or fringed rue, popular in Ethiopian cuisine
- Peganum harmala, an unrelated plant also known as "Syrian rue"
