= Crancelin =

Heraldic figure

A green crancelin in the coat of arms of Saxony

The "crown of rue" as it appears in the coat of arms of Albert, Prince Consort (1819–1861), Duke of Saxony, husband and consort of Queen Victoria

Crancelin (or "crown of rue") is a charge in heraldry, usually seen in the bend on a shield. It depicts a band of a stylized trefoil leaves, representing a branch of common rue (Ruta graveolens). It can be found in the coat of arms of Saxony. Legend has it that at the investiture of Bernhard, Count of Anhalt and Ballenstedt, as Duke of Saxony, the then emperor, Frederick I Barbarossa, took the chaplet of rue he was wearing and placed it over the corner of Bernhard's shield. To commemorate this act, the crancelin vert was added to the Ballenstedt arms (barry sable and or).

The Encyclopédie of 1751 defined it as a "portion of a crown placed in bend across a shield". The French word is from the German Kränzlein ("little garland / wreathlet").

The bearing is sometimes called "a ducal coronet in bend" or "a bend archy coronetty". It is known in German as Rautenkranz ("garland / wreath of rue").

== See also ==
- Order of the Rue Crown
