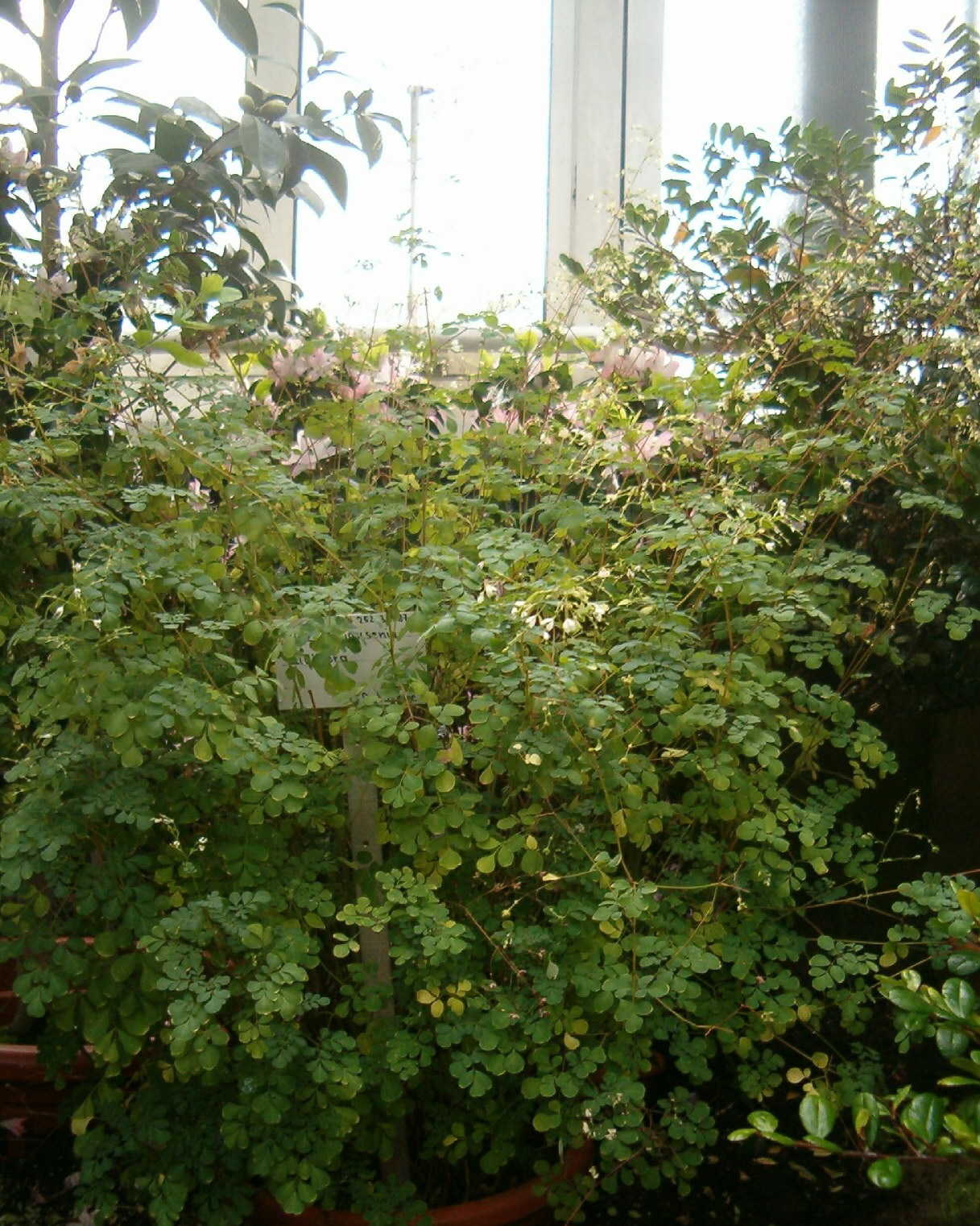

Scientific classification
- Kingdom: Plantae
- Clade: Tracheophytes
- Clade: Angiosperms
- Clade: Eudicots
- Clade: Rosids
- Order: Sapindales
- Family: Rutaceae
- Subfamily: Rutoideae
- Genus: Boenninghausenia; Rchb. ex Meisn.
- Species: B. albiflora

Binomial name
- Boenninghausenia albiflora (Hook.) Rchb. ex Meisn.

Synonyms
- Bodinieria thalictrifolia H.Lév. & Vaniot; Boenninghausenia albiflora var. pilosa Z.M.Tan; Boenninghausenia schizocarpa S.Y.Hu; Boenninghausenia sessilicarpa H.Lév.; Podostaurus thalictroides Jungh.; Ruta albiflora Hook.; Ruta dampatis Buch.-Ham. ex D.Don; Ruta japonica Siebold ex Hook.f.

= Boenninghausenia =

Genus of flowering plants

Boenninghausenia is a monotypic genus of flowering plants in the family Rutaceae. The sole species is Boenninghausenia albiflora, which occurs in Bhutan, Nepal, Pakistan, Kashmir, India, Indonesia, Philippines, Myanmar, Thailand, Laos, North Vietnam, China and Japan.

There are two accepted subspecies:

- Boenninghausenia albiflora var. albiflora
- Boenninghausenia albiflora var. japonica (Nakai ex Makino & Nemoto) S.Suzuki ex H.Ohba
