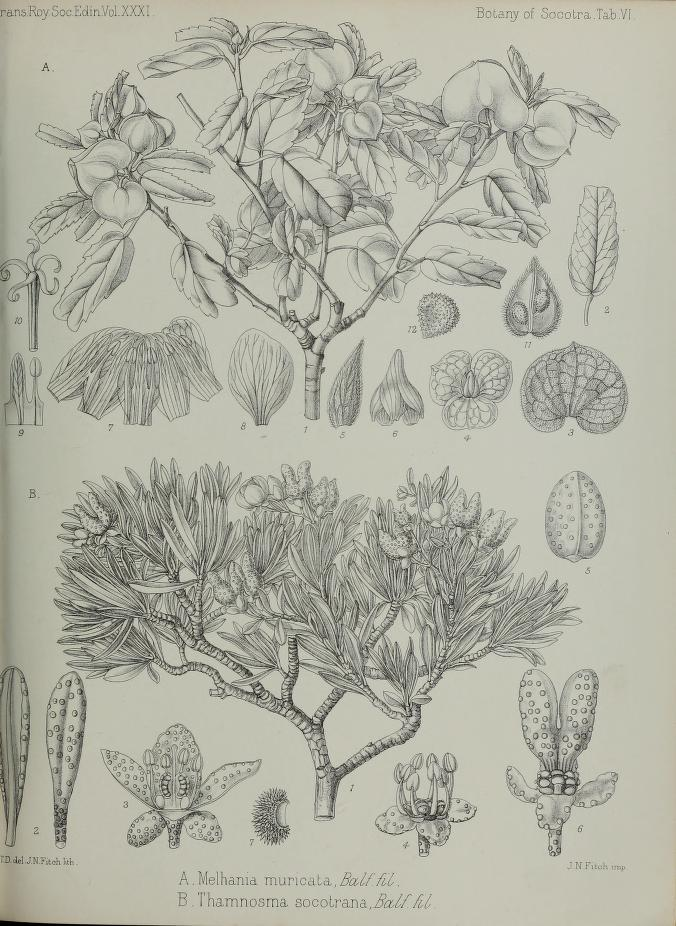

Conservation status
- Vulnerable (IUCN 3.1)

Scientific classification
- Kingdom: Plantae
- Clade: Tracheophytes
- Clade: Angiosperms
- Clade: Eudicots
- Clade: Rosids
- Order: Sapindales
- Family: Rutaceae
- Genus: Thamnosma
- Species: T. socotrana

Binomial name
- Thamnosma socotrana Balf.f. (1882)

= Thamnosma socotrana =

Species of plant

Thamnosma socotrana is a species of plant in the family Rutaceae. It is a subshrub endemic to the Hajhir Mountains on the island of Socotra in Yemen. It has evergreen, strongly aromatic leaves with strongly inrolled margins. It is locally common in low montane shrubland from 700 to 1,400 metres elevation.
