= Coat of arms of Saxony =

Coat of arms of the German state of Saxony

- Armiger: Free State of Saxony
- Adopted: 1990
- Shield: Barry of ten sable and or, a crancelin vert

The coat of arms of the present-day German free state of Saxony shows a tenfold horizontally-partitioned (Barry of ten) field of black (sable) and gold/yellow (or) stripes, charged with a green (vert) crancelin (a stylized common rue) running from the viewer's top-left to bottom-right (in bend). Although the crancelin is sometimes shown bent (embowed) like a crown, this is due to artistic license. The coat of arms is also displayed on the state flag of Saxony.

The Coat of Arms of Liechtenstein includes the similar arms of the Kuenring family. It has no connection to the arms of Saxony.

== History ==
The shield "Barry of ten sable and or, a crancelin vert" deduce from the Saxon counts of Ballenstedt (in present-day Saxony-Anhalt), ancestors of the ducal House of Ascania. The Ascanian margrave Albert the Bear achieved the Saxon ducal title in 1138; when his Welf successor Henry the Lion was deposed by Emperor Frederick Barbarossa in 1180, Albert's son Bernhard, Count of Anhalt received the remaining Saxon territories around Wittenberg and Lauenburg, and the ducal title. Legend goes that when he rode in front of the emperor, at the occasion of his investiture, carrying his escutcheon with the Ballenstedt coat of arms (barry sable and or), Barbarossa took the rue wreath he wore against the heat of the sun from his head, hanging it over Bernhard's shield and thus creating the Saxonian crancelin vert.

From about 1260, the Duchy of Saxe-Wittenberg emerged under the Ascanian duke Albert II, who adopted the tradition of the Saxon stem duchy and especially took over the Saxon electoral dignity, against the fierce protest of his Ascanian Saxe-Lauenburg cousins but confirmed by the Golden Bull of 1356. The Saxe-Wittenberg black and golden shield already displayed the Gothic crancelin, probably symbolizing the waiver of the Lauenburg lands. As the Ascanian Electors of Saxony also held the High office of an Arch-Marshal of the Holy Roman Empire, they added the ensign Per fess sable and argent two swords in saltire gules (the swords later featuring as the trademark of the Meissen china factory) to their coat of arms. When the line became extinct in 1422, the arms and electoral dignity were adopted by the Wettin margrave Frederick IV of Meissen.

When upon the German reunification the Free State of Saxony was re-established, the coat of arms was formally confirmed in 1991:

The Landtag of Saxony state parliament has passed on 25 October 1991 the following law:

§ 1 (1) The lesser coat-of-arms of the Free State of Saxony shows an escutcheon bendy of nine pieces black and gold, a green rue-crown bendwise. (2) A greater coat-of-arms of the Free State of Saxony can be determined by a special law.

§ 2 For the rendering of the coat-of-arms the patterns, which are attached to this law as appendix, are authoritative. The coloured patterns are deposited in the Main Public Record Office of Saxony.

§ 3 The regulations necessary for the implementation of this law are issued by the State Government. It can pass on this authority.

§ 4 This law comes into force the day after its proclamation.

The preceding law is executed herewith and is to be proclaimed.

— Prof. Dr. Kurt Biedenkopf (Minister President), Steffen Heitmann (State Minister of Justice), Law relating to the coat-of-arms of the Free State of Saxony of 18 November 1991, (Saxon Law and Official Gazette 1991, p. 383-385), Dresden, 18 November 1991.

The Constitution of the Free State of Saxony adopted by the Landtag on 26 May 1992 stated the country flag displays in a ninefold partitioned field of Black and Gold a right diagonal green crancelin.

== Galleries ==
=== Previous versions ===
Previous versions
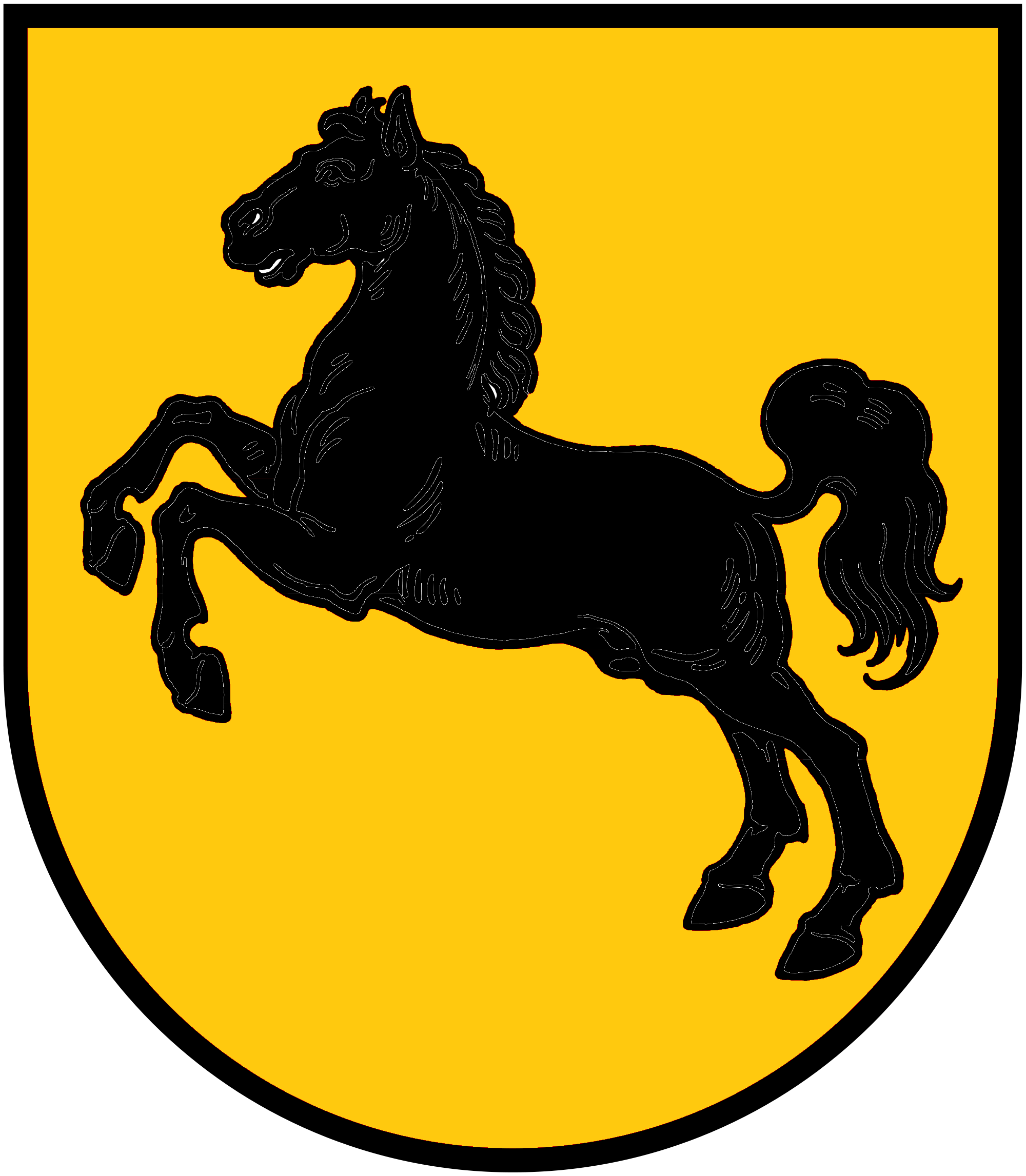
Black Saxon Steed, according to legend Duke Widukind's ensign for Old Saxony (700–785)

Widukind's White Steed as ensign of the Duchy of Saxony, claimed by the House of Welf from 1361, adopted by the Electorate of Hanover

Counts of Aschersleben (Ascharia), ancestors of the House of Ascania, from about 1000

Counts of Ballenstedt, ancestors of the House of Ascania, from about 1000

Meissen Lion of the Wettin margraves (965–1423), beloved in the heraldic

Red Eagle used from 1170 by the Ascanian margrave Otto I of Brandenburg, son of Albert the Bear, probably derived from a hereditary family ensign since around 900

Saxe-Lauenburg (1296–1803; 1814–1876)

Electorate of Saxony (1356–1806) with the crossed swords of the Imperial Arch-Marshal and the green crancelin.

Frederick of Saxony, 36th Grand Master of the Teutonic Knights ruled over the Teutonic bailiwicks of Thuringia (Hesse and Saxony), the Saxon County Palatinate and Meissen (1498–1510)

Royal coat of arms of the Polish–Lithuanian Commonwealth, ruled in personal union by the Saxon electors Augustus II the Strong (1697–1706) and Augustus III the Saxon (1734–1763)

Coat of arms of Elector Frederick Augustus II, King of Poland, as Imperial vicar

Kingdom of Saxony (1806–1918)

Coat of Arms of the Napoleonic Duchy of Warsaw (1807–1815), ruled in personal union by King Frederick Augustus I of Saxony

Prussian Province of Saxony (1816–1944)

Saxe-Coburg and Braganza Branch, Empire of Brazil (1822–1889)

Coat of Arms of Ferdinand II, King of Portugal

=== Ernestine duchies ===
Ernestine duchies
Saxe-Weimar (1572–1809)

Saxe-Coburg and Gotha (1826–1918)

Saxe-Gotha-Altenburg (1680–1826)

Duchy of Saxe-Altenburg (1602–1672; 1826–1918)

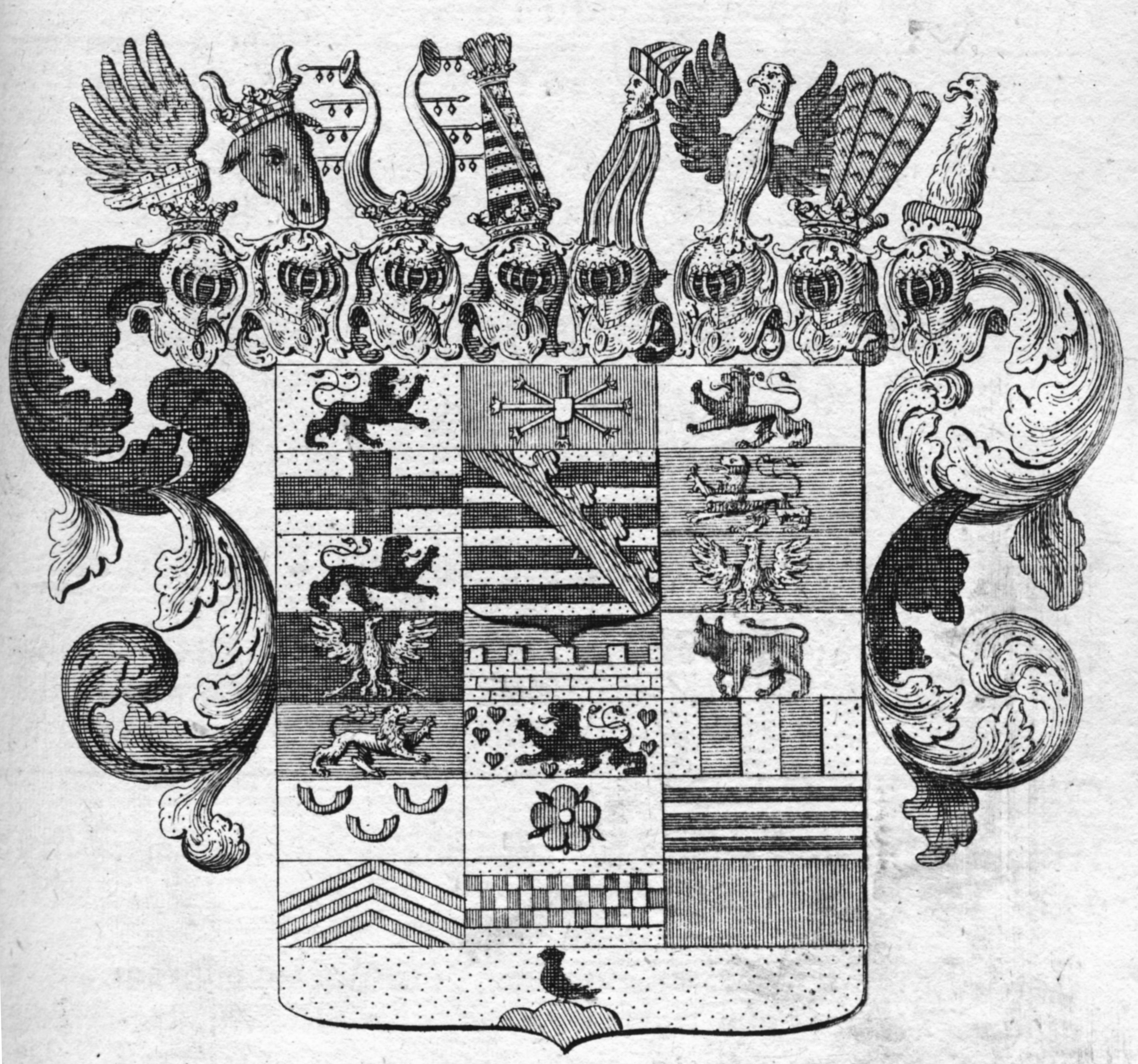
Saxe-Merseburg (1657–1738)

Saxe-Weissenfels (1656–1746)

Saxe-Hildburghausen (1680–1826)

Duchy of Saxe-Weimar-Eisenach (1809–1918)

Saxony/ Saxe-Jena (1672–1690) Saxe-Eisenach (1596–1638; 1640–1644; 1662–1809)/ Saxe-Coburg-Eisenach (1572–1596; 1633–1638)/ Saxe-Weimar (1572–1809)/ Saxe-Wittenberg (1296–1356) with the black-yellow imperial colored stripes and green crancelin

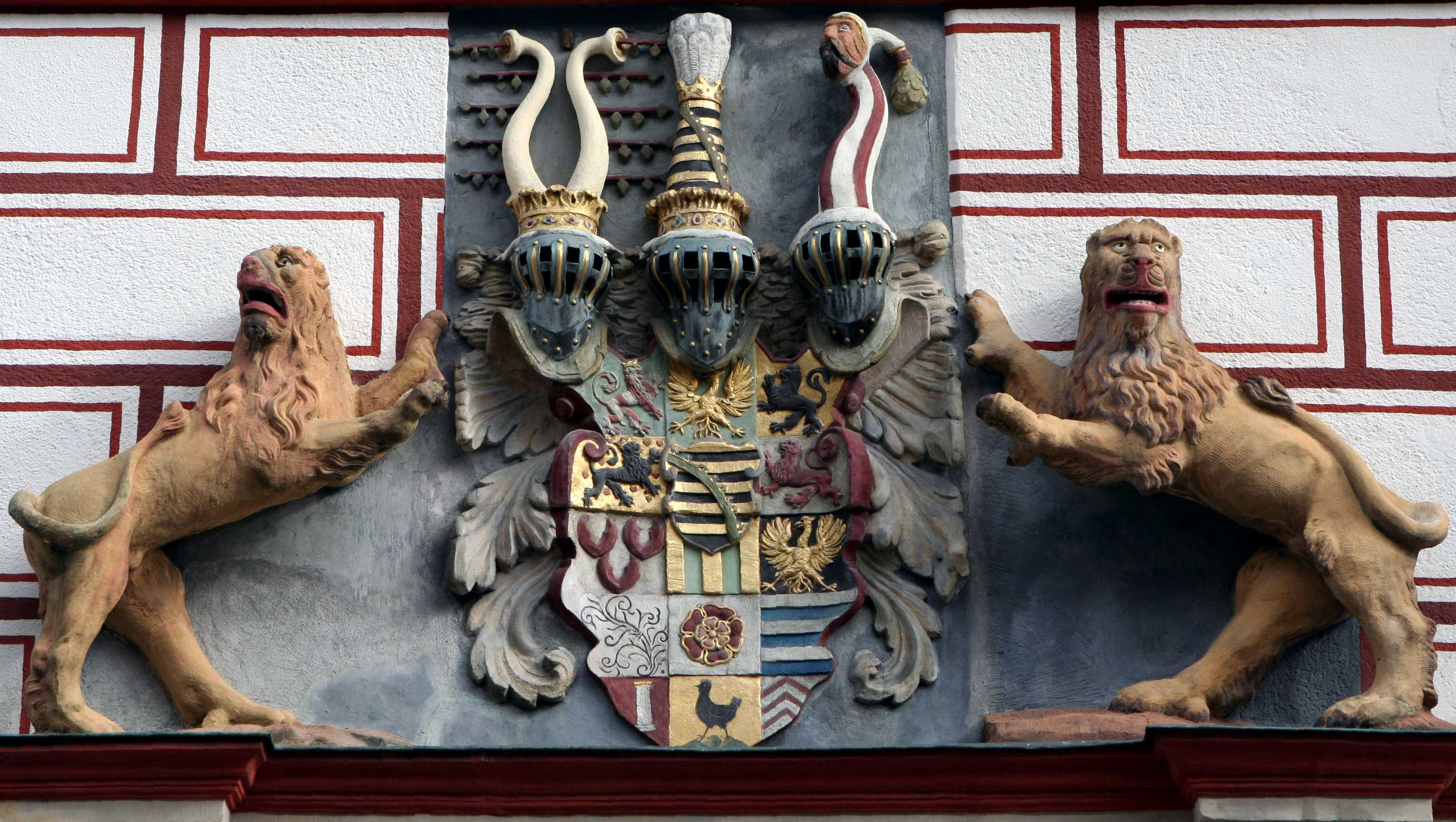
Saxe-Coburg (1596–1633; 1680–1735)

Saxe-Meiningen (1680–1918)

=== United Kingdom ===
Princes of the United Kingdom
George V (as Duke of York)

George V (as Prince of Wales)

Prince Arthur, Duke of Connaught and Strathearn

Princess Beatrice of the United Kingdom

Princess Beatrice of Saxe-Coburg and Gotha

Princess Alice of the United Kingdom

Princess Alexandra of Saxe-Coburg and Gotha

Alfred, Hereditary Prince of Saxe-Coburg and Gotha

Prince Albert of Saxe-Coburg and Gotha

Victoria, Princess Royal

Princess Victoria Melita of Saxe-Coburg and Gotha

Edward VII (as Prince of Wales)

Princess Maud of Wales

Princess Marie of Edinburgh

Mary of Teck (as Princess of Wales)

Louise, Princess Royal

Princess Louise, Duchess of Argyll

Prince Leopold, Duke of Albany

Princess Helena of the United Kingdom

Princess Victoria of the United Kingdom

Prince Albert Victor, Duke of Clarence and Avondale

Princess Beatrice of Saxe-Coburg and Gotha (as British Princess)

Alfred of Saxe-Coburg and Gotha (as British Prince)

Alfred, Duke of Saxe-Coburg and Gotha

Adelaide of Saxe-Meiningen

Duke of Connaught and Strathearn

=== Belgium ===
Belgian royal family
King Leopold I

Prince Philippe, Count of Flanders

King Leopord II and Albert I

King Philippe

Princess Elisabeth, Duchess of Brabant

Charlotte of Belgium, Empress consort of Mexico

=== Bulgaria ===
Bulgarian royal family
Tsar Boris III (as Prince of Tarnovo)

Simeon Saxe-Coburg-Gotha (formerly Tsar Simeon II)

Kiril of Bulgaria, Prince of Preslav

Princess Eudoxia of Bulgaria

Princess Nadezhda of Bulgaria

Princess Marie Louise of Bourbon-Parma

Queen Eleonore of Bulgaria

=== Spain ===
Spanish royal family
Maria Amalia of Saxony

Maria Josepha Amalia of Saxony

Princess Beatrice of Saxe-Coburg and Gotha
(as Spanish Infanta by marriage and Duchess Consort of Galliera)

=== Luxembourg ===
Luxembourgish Ducal Family
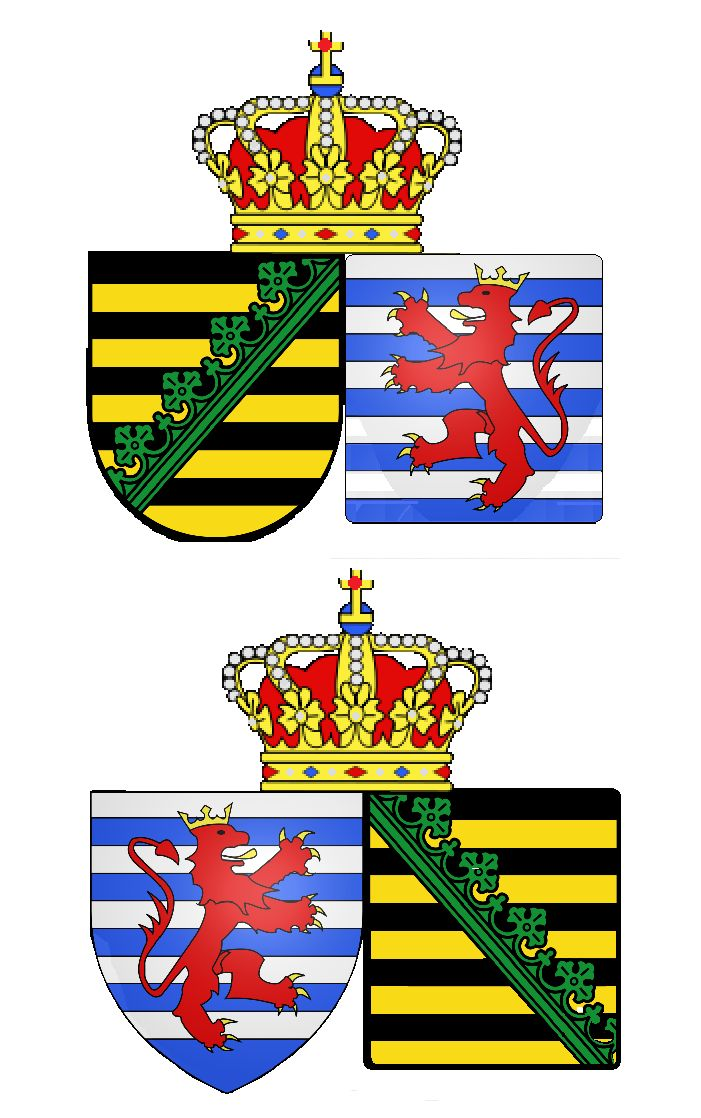
Respectant

Maurice of Nassau

=== Poland ===
Poland
Chrzanów

Piotrków Kujawski

=== Nazi Germany ===
Gau Saxony (1933–1945)

== See also ==
- Coat of arms of England
- Coat of arms of Portugal
- Coat of arms of Belgium
- Coat of arms of Bulgaria
