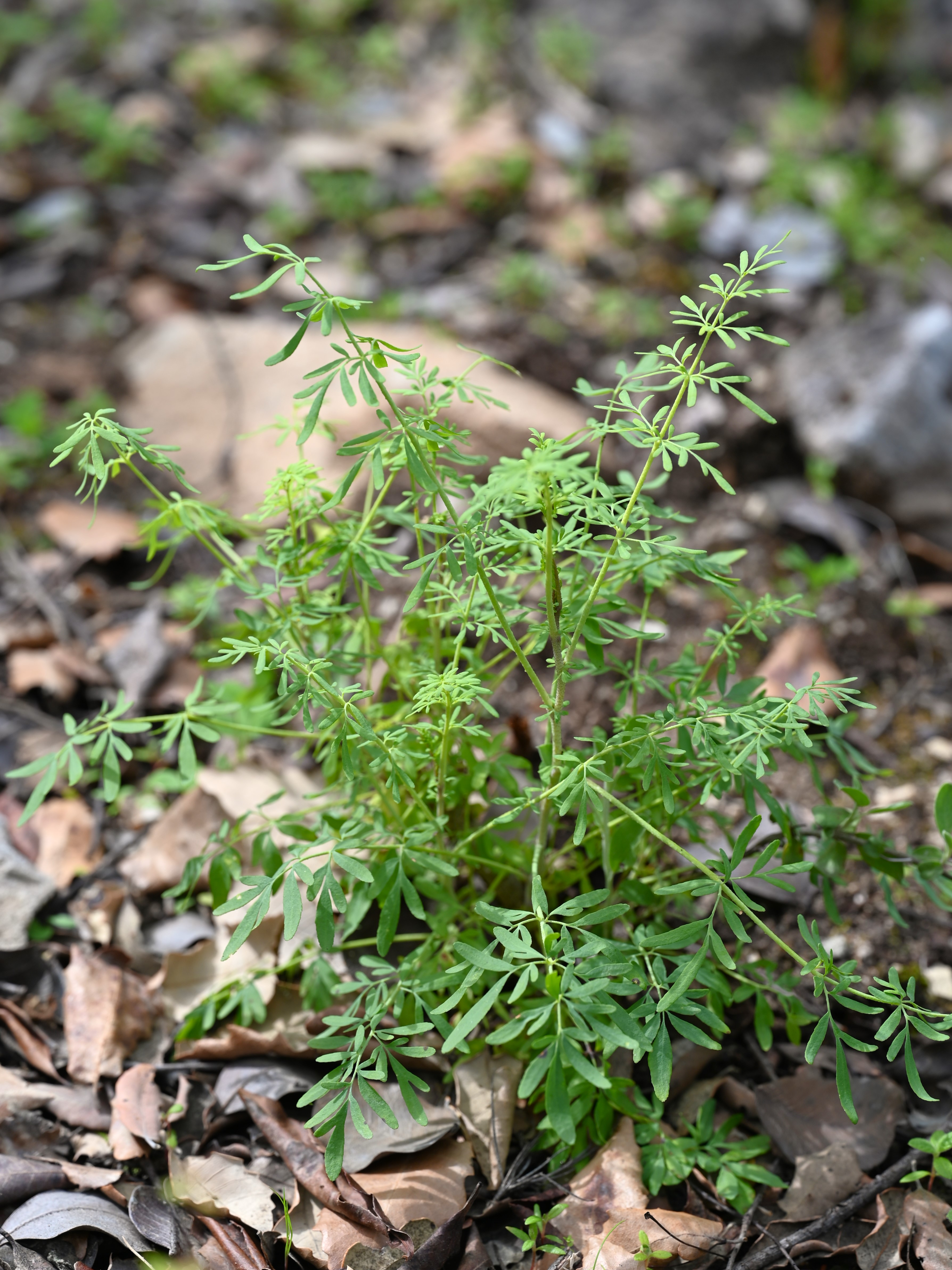

Scientific classification
- Kingdom: Plantae
- Clade: Embryophytes
- Clade: Tracheophytes
- Clade: Angiosperms
- Clade: Eudicots
- Clade: Rosids
- Order: Sapindales
- Family: Rutaceae
- Genus: Ruta
- Species: R. angustifolia

Binomial name
- Ruta angustifolia Pers.

Synonyms
- List: Ruta chalepensis subsp. angustifolia (Pers.) Cout.; Ruta chalepensis var. angustifolia (Pers.) Willk.; Ruta graveolens var. angustifolia (Pers.) Alef.; Ruta angustifolia var. attenuata Cout.; Ruta chalepensis var. attenuata (Cout.) Samp.; Ruta chalepensis var. granatensis Pau; Ruta chalepensis f. longirrostris Pau & Font Quer; Ruta chalepensis var. longirrostris Pau & Font Quer; Ruta chalepensis var. pellucido-punctata Sennen; Ruta chalepensis var. pellucido-punctata Sennen; Ruta chalepensis f. tetuanensis Pau

= Ruta angustifolia =

Species of flowering plant

Ruta angustifolia, the narrow-leaved fringed rue, is a small shrub belonging to the Rutaceae family. It is native to the Mediterranean, and has been adapted to various parts of the world.

== Distribution ==
It is found in Algeria, Morocco, Tunisia, Italy, Sicily, Yugoslavia, Corsica, France, Portugal, Sardinia and Spain.
