= Psilopeganum =

Scientific classification
- Kingdom: Plantae
- Clade: Tracheophytes
- Clade: Angiosperms
- Clade: Eudicots
- Clade: Rosids
- Order: Sapindales
- Family: Rutaceae
- Subfamily: Rutoideae
- Genus: Psilopeganum; Hemsl.
- Species: P. sinense

Binomial name
- Psilopeganum sinense Hemsl.

Genus of plants

Psilopeganum is a genus of flowering plants of the family Rutaceae.

== Characteristics ==
It is a monotypic genus, with only a single species: Psilopeganum sinense (Chinese: 山麻黄; pinyin: shān má huáng, not to be confused with Ephedra/ma huang).

== Distribution ==
It is native to the Three Gorges Reservoir area, in the Hubei province of central China, where it has become endangered. A specimen exists at the New York Botanical Garden.

== Medicinal uses ==
Psilopeganum sinense is one of the 50 fundamental herbs used in traditional Chinese medicine.

== See also ==
- Chinese herbology 50 fundamental herbs
