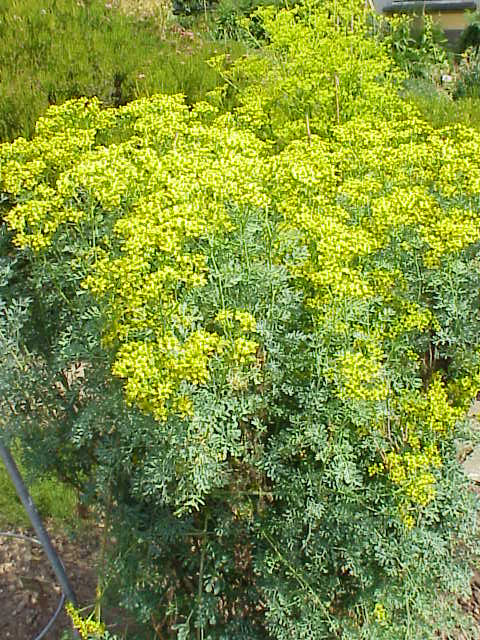
- Ruta chalepensis, fringed rue

Scientific classification
- Kingdom: Plantae
- Clade: Tracheophytes
- Clade: Angiosperms
- Clade: Eudicots
- Clade: Rosids
- Order: Sapindales
- Family: Rutaceae
- Subfamily: Rutoideae
- Genus: Ruta; L.

Species
- See text.

= Ruta =

Genus of shrubs

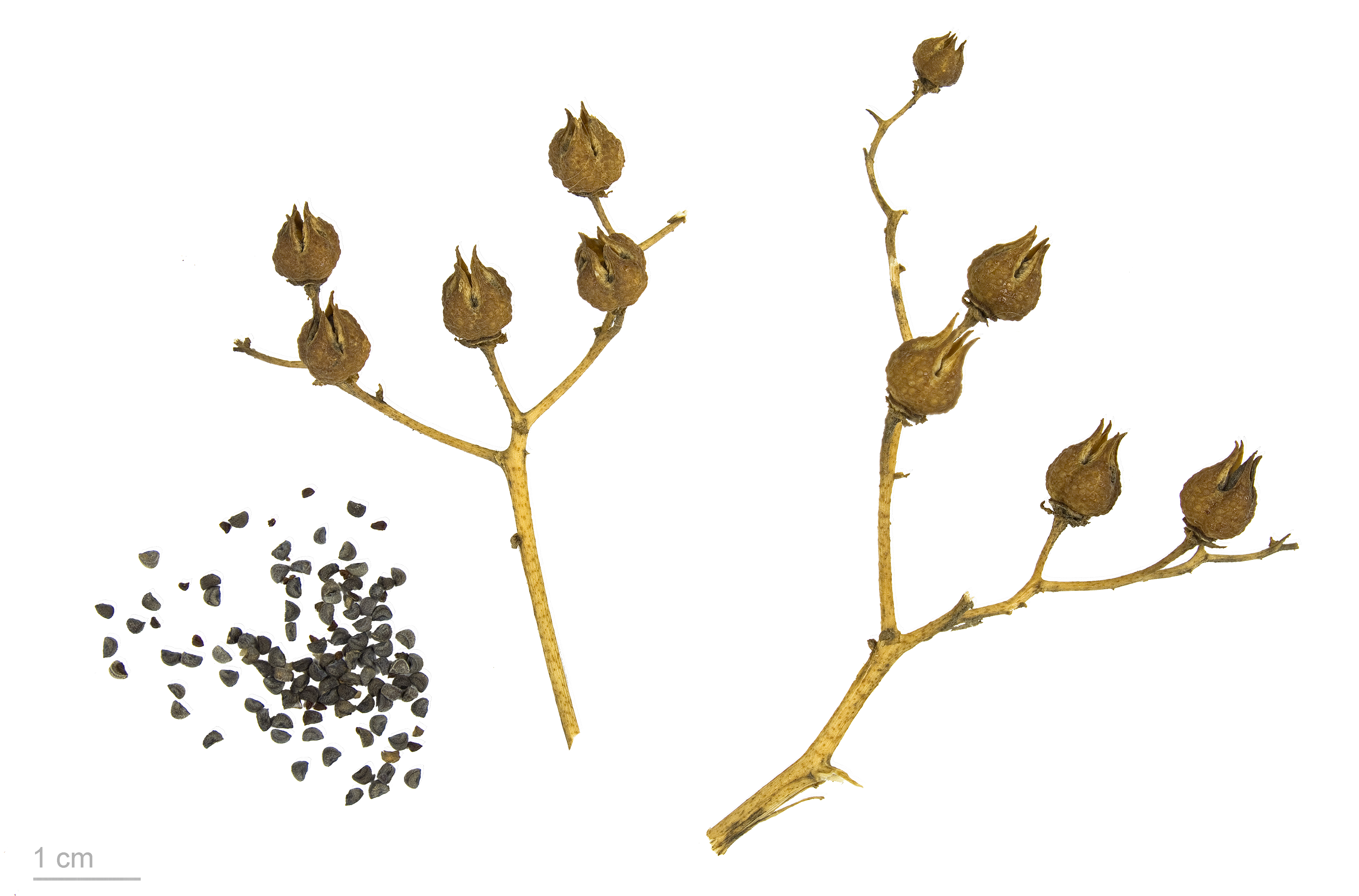
Ruta angustifolia – MHNT

Ruta (commonly known as rue) is a genus of strongly scented evergreen subshrubs, 20–60 cm (8–24 in) tall, in the family Rutaceae, native to the Mediterranean region, Macaronesia and southwest Asia. About ten species are accepted in the genus. The most well-known species is Ruta graveolens (rue or common rue).

The leaves are bipinnate or tripinnate, with a feathery appearance, and green to strongly glaucous blue-green in colour. The flowers are yellow, with 4–5 petals, about 1 cm (1/2 in) across, and borne in cymes. The fruit is a 4–5-lobed capsule, containing numerous seeds.

== Species ==
As of September 2021, Plants of the World Online accepted ten species:

- Ruta angustifolia Pers.
- Ruta chalepensis L.
- Ruta corsica DC.
- Ruta graveolens L.
- Ruta lamarmorae Bacch., Brullo & Giusso
- Ruta lindsayi Turrill
- Ruta microcarpa Svent.
- Ruta montana (L.) L.
- Ruta oreojasme Webb
- Ruta pinnata L.f.

== Traditional uses ==
Ruta graveolens and Ruta chalepensis are often confused in the literature.

Ruta is the national flower of Lithuania, many poems and songs have been written about it. Ruta is depicted in songs as a universal symbol – virgins wear it while expecting a baby boy, and a sprig of rue adorns weddings and engagements. In addition, the female name Rūta is quite popular in Lithuania. This perennial plant is also grown in America, Western Europe, Asia and Africa. In the wild, it grows from the Canary Islands to the Mediterranean Sea. In general, rue has been known for many centuries. Even the ancient Greeks used it to treat many ailments.

Tena'Adam (Ruta chalepensis), meaning "Health of Adam" in Amharic, is an aromatic, shrubby herb widely used in Ethiopian culture. Known for its pungent, citrus-like scent, it is commonly added to coffee and tea to enhance flavour, used in spices like Berbere, and treated in traditional medicine for ailments like stomach issues and headaches.

Since medieval times, rue has been used as an additive to wines (both white and red) to enhance its flavour and its keeping properties. The Dutch name wijnruit, translates as wine rue. In Italy, rue is added to grappa to produce Grappa alla Ruta. Rue's toxicity has long been known but since it appears to be slight it has been used as an additive in wine for a long time.

In Brazil the plant is called arruda in Portuguese and is claimed to protect against the evil eye. Sephardic Jews also use the herb for protection against evil eye.

Traditionally, it is considered to have various health benefits including as a digestive aid and as an anti-inflammatory in joint pain and arthritis. It is also used to regulate the menstrual cycle and helps in relieving menstrual cramps. It also helps in reducing muscle spasms and cramps.

== Precautions ==
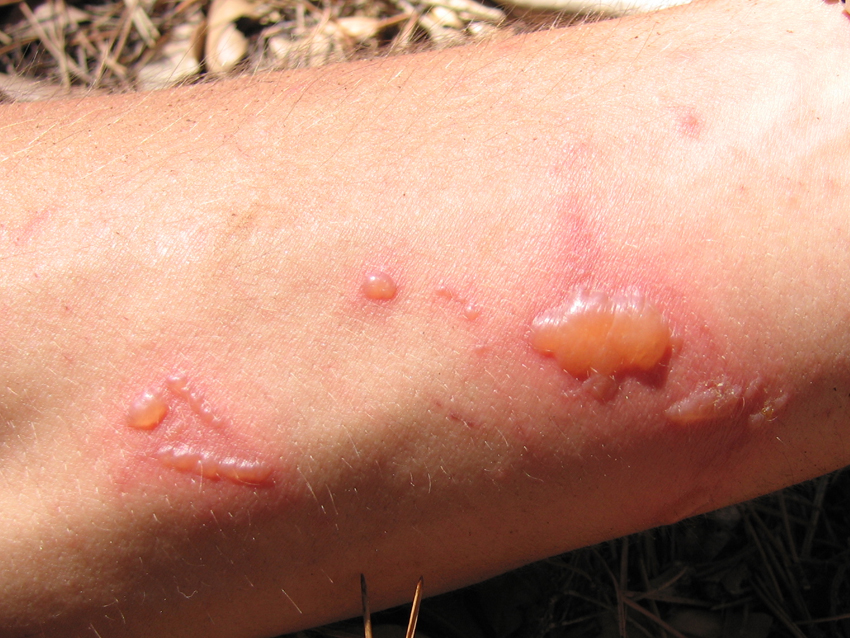
Effect of common rue on skin in hot weather

Caution should be taken with using rue topically. Applied to the skin with sun exposure, the oil and leaves can cause blistering. Some people are much more sensitive than others. Exposure to common rue, or herbal preparations derived from it, can cause severe phytophotodermatitis, which results in burn-like blisters on the skin. The mechanism of action is currently unknown.
