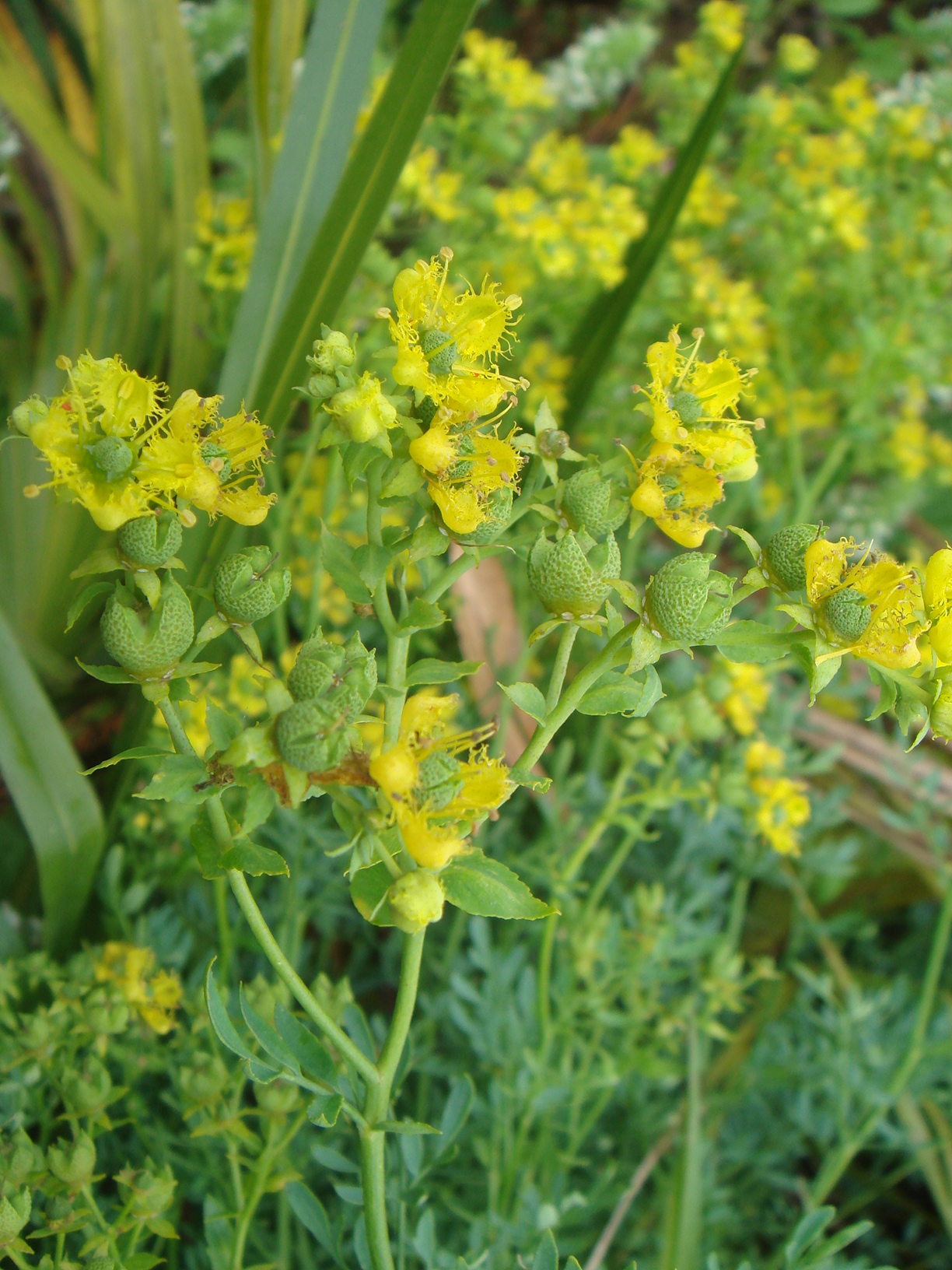

Scientific classification
- Kingdom: Plantae
- Clade: Embryophytes
- Clade: Tracheophytes
- Clade: Angiosperms
- Clade: Eudicots
- Clade: Rosids
- Order: Sapindales
- Family: Rutaceae
- Genus: Ruta
- Species: R. chalepensis

Binomial name
- Ruta chalepensis L.

= Ruta chalepensis =

Species of plant

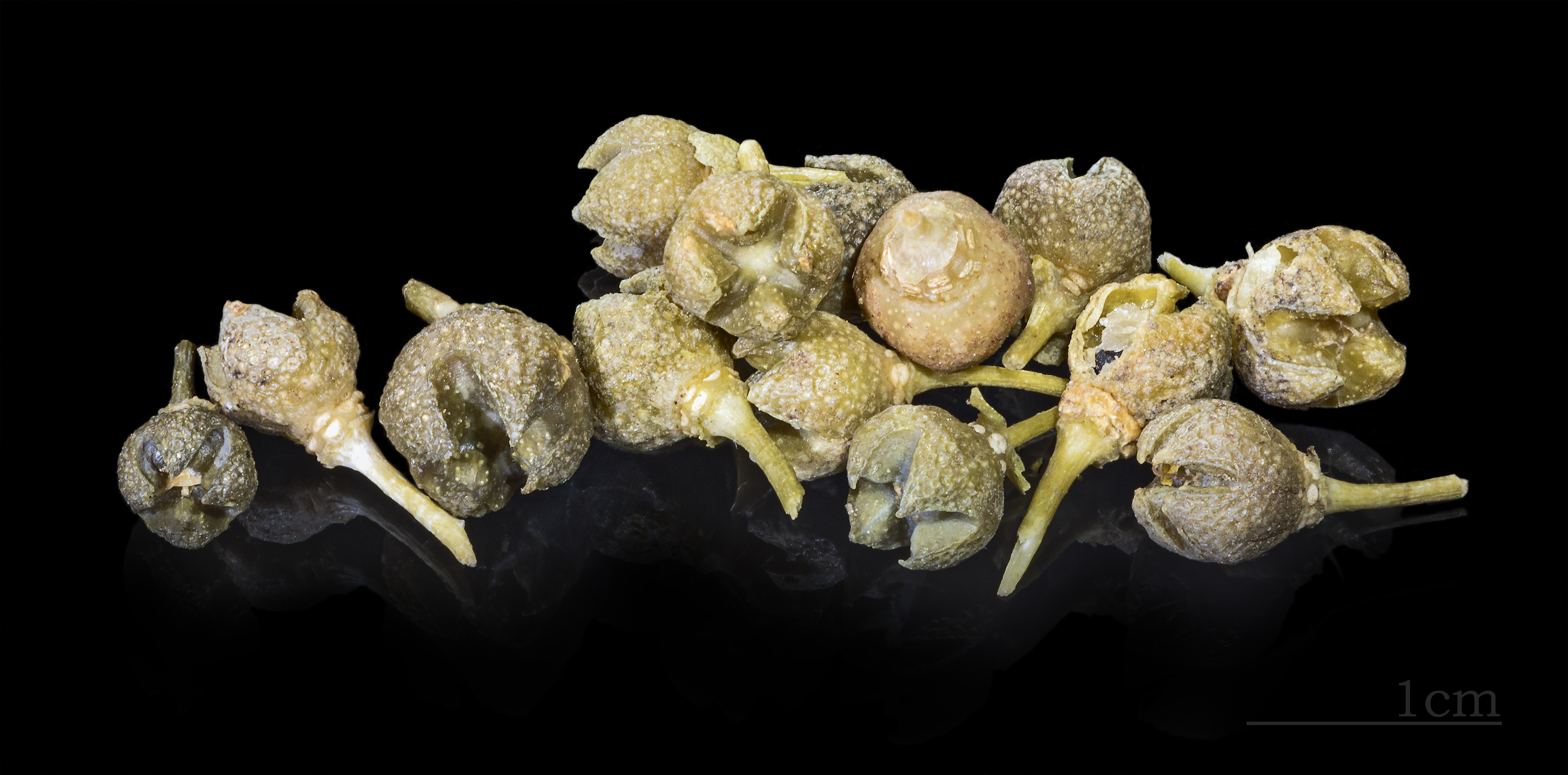
Dried fruits.

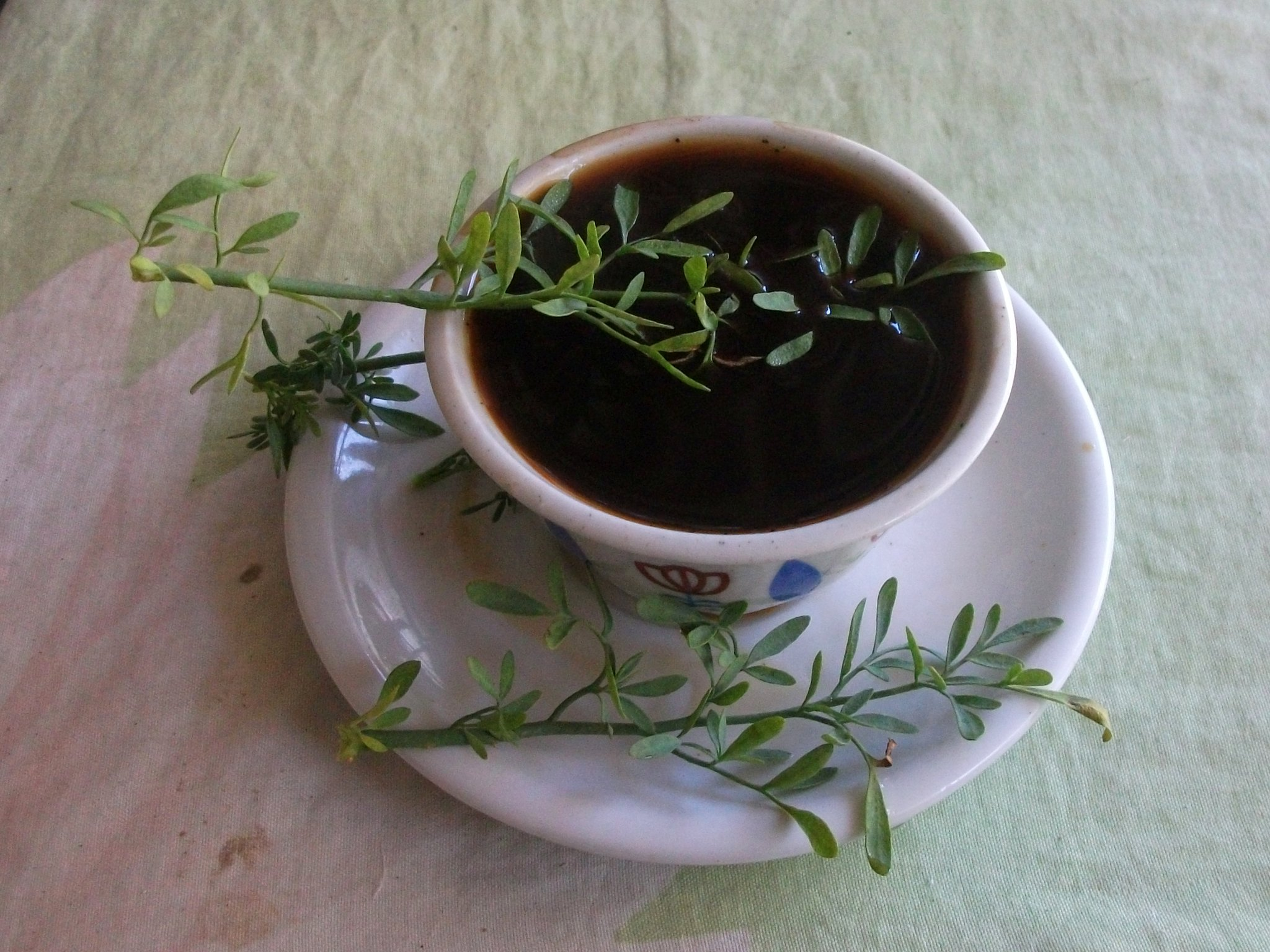
Ruta "Tena Adam" in coffee in Ethiopia

Ruta chalepensis is a species of flowering plant in the Rutaceae family known by the common name fringed rue. It is native to the Mediterranean and is found elsewhere as an introduced species. It is a perennial herb growing up to 80 centimeters tall. The leaves are compound, each divided into several segments which are subdivided into smaller leaflets. The inflorescence is a cluster of flowers, each with four or five bright yellow petals with rolled, fringed edges. The fruit is a textured capsule which is divided into pointed lobes.

In traditional herbal medicine, the plant is used for a number of ailments, such as fever and inflammation.

R. chalepensis is the original source of the chemical compound chalepensin.

== Culinary ==
R. chalepensis is an introduced species in Ethiopia, where it is cultivated in gardens in almost every province of the country and used as a culinary herb. The seeds are used to flavour wats and the leaves as a condiment in coffee and tea. Called Tena adam (Adam's health) in Amharic, it is used in the Ethiopian coffee ceremony. Its dried fruit are marketed as a spice in Western countries, often under the name "passion berries" since the odour is said to resemble passion fruit.
