= Family tree of Belgian monarchs =

This is a family tree of the Kings of the Belgians, hereditary, constitutional monarchs of Belgium as defined by the Belgian Constitution.

Francis; Duke of Saxe- Coburg-Saalfeld; 1750–1806 r. 1800–1806	Augusta; Reuss of Ebersdorf; 1757–1831
Charlotte of Wales; 1796–1817	Leopold I King of the Belgians; 1790–1865 r. 1831–1865	Louise of Orléans; 1812–1850
Louis; Philippe; 1833–1834	Leopold II; King of the Belgians; 1835–1909 r. 1865–1909	Marie Henriette of Austria; 1836–1902	Philippe; Count of Flanders 1837–1905	Marie of Hohenzollern- Sigmaringen; 1845–1912	Carlota of Mexico; 1840–1927	Maximilian I Emperor of Mexico; 1832–1867 r. 1863–1867
Philipp of Saxe-Coburg and Gotha; 1844–1921	Louise of Belgium; 1858–1924	Leopold; Duke of Brabant 1859–1869	Rudolf; Cr. Prince of Austria; 1858–1889	Stéphanie of Belgium; 1864–1945	Albert I King of the Belgians; 1875–1934 r. 1909–1934	Elisabeth of Bavaria; 1876–1965	Baudouin of Flanders; 1869–1891
Astrid of Sweden; 1905–1935	Leopold III; King of the Belgians; 1901–1983 r. 1934–1951	Lilian; Princess of Réthy; 1916–2002	Charles of Flanders; Prince Regent; 1903–1983 regency 1944–1950	Marie; José of Belgium; 1906–2001	Umberto II; King of Italy; 1904–1983 r. 1946
Jean; Grand Duke of Luxembourg; 1921–2019 r. 1964–2000	Joséphine; Charlotte of Belgium; 1927–2005	Fabiola de Mora y Aragón; 1928–2014	Baudouin; King of the Belgians; 1930–1993 r. 1951–1993	Albert II King of the Belgians b. 1934 r. 1993–2013	Paola; Ruffo di Calabria b. 1937	Alexander of Belgium; 1942–2009	Léa; Wolman b. 1951	Marie; Christine of Belgium b. 1951	Marie; Esméralda of Belgium b. 1956
Mathilde d'Udekem d'Acoz b. 1973	Philippe; King of the Belgians b. 1960 r. 2013–present	Astrid of Belgium b. 1962; Archduchess of Austria-Este	Lorenz; Archduke of Austria-Este b. 1955	Laurent of Belgium b. 1963	Claire; Coombs b. 1974
Louise of Belgium b. 2004	Nicolas of Belgium b. 2005	Aymeric of Belgium b. 2005
Elisabeth; Duchess of Brabant b. 2001	Gabriel of Belgium b. 2003	Emmanuel of Belgium b. 2005	Eléonore of Belgium b. 2008	Amedeo of Belgium; Archduke of Austria-Este b. 1986	Maria; Laura; Archduchess of Austria-Este b. 1988	Joachim of Belgium; Archduke of Austria-Este b. 1991	Luisa; Maria; Archduchess of Austria-Este b. 1995	Laetitia; Maria; Archduchess of Austria-Este b. 2003

== House of Belgium (simplified) ==
Leopold I King of the Belgians; 1790–1865 r. 1831–1865
Leopold II; King of the Belgians; 1835–1909 r. 1865–1909	Philippe; Count of Flanders 1837–1905
Albert I King of the Belgians; 1875–1934 r. 1909–1934
Leopold III; King of the Belgians; 1901–1983 r. 1934–1951
Baudouin; King of the Belgians; 1930–1993 r. 1951–1993	Albert II King of the Belgians b. 1934 r. 1993–2013
Philippe; King of the Belgians b. 1960 r. 2013–present

== See also ==
- List of Belgian monarchs
- List of heirs to the Belgian throne
- Line of succession to the Belgian throne
- Crown Council of Belgium
- Princess Delphine of Belgium

== Sources ==
Pirenne, Henri (1948). Histoire de Belgique (in French). Vol. VII: De la Révolution de 1830 à la Guerre de 1914 (2nd ed.). Brussels: Maurice Lamertin.
