= Royal Crypt (Belgium) =

Burial place of the Belgian royal family

Coordinates: 50.8791°N 4.3555°E

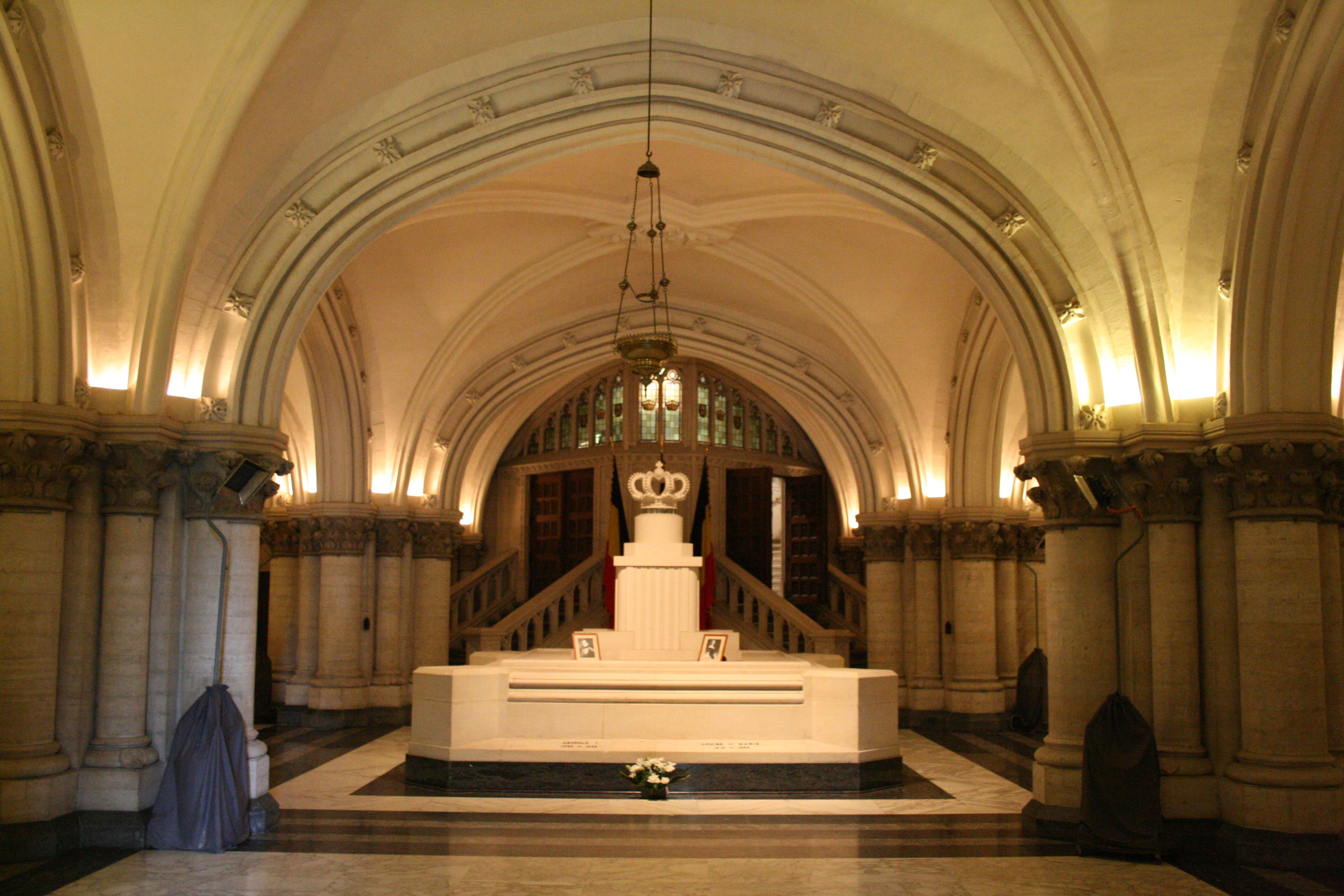
King Leopold I and Queen Louise

The Royal Crypt (French: Crypte royale; Dutch: Koninklijke Crypte) lies underneath the Church of Our Lady in the Brussels district of Laeken, Belgium. It is the official burial place of the Belgian royal family, including all the Kings of the Belgians and their wives. Several members of the family are buried elsewhere, however, due to their marriage with foreign royalty or nobility.

== Tombs of family members ==
1. Crown Prince Louis Philippe (24 July 1833 – 16 May 1834) – (Son of King Leopold I)
2. Queen Louise-Marie (3 April 1812 – 11 October 1850) – (Second wife of King Leopold I)
3. King Leopold I (16 December 1790 – 10 December 1865)
4. Prince Leopold, Duke of Brabant (12 June 1859 – 22 January 1869) – (Son of King Leopold II)
5. Princess Joséphine Marie (30 November 1870 – 18 January 1871) – (Daughter of Prince Philippe)
6. Prince Baudouin (3 June 1869 – 23 January 1891) – (Son of Prince Philippe)
7. Queen Marie Henriette (23 August 1836 – 19 September 1902) – (Wife of King Leopold II)
8. Prince Philippe (24 March 1837 – 17 November 1905) – (Son of King Leopold I)
9. King Leopold II (9 April 1835 – 17 December 1909)
10. Princess Marie (17 November 1845 – 26 November 1912) – (Wife of Prince Philippe)
11. Empress Charlotte (7 June 1840 – 19 January 1927) – (Wife of Emperor Maximilian I of Mexico, Daughter of King Leopold I)
12. King Albert I (8 April 1875 – 17 February 1934)
13. Queen Astrid (17 November 1905 – 29 August 1935) – (First wife of King Leopold III)
14. Queen Elisabeth (25 July 1876 – 23 November 1965) – (Wife of King Albert I)
15. Prince Charles (10 October 1903 – 1 June 1983) – (Son of King Albert I)
16. King Leopold III (3 November 1901 – 25 September 1983)
17. Prince Leopold of Liechtenstein (20 May 1984 – 20 May 1984) – (Grandson of Joséphine-Charlotte of Belgium, Grand Duchess of Luxembourg)
18. King Baudouin (7 September 1930 – 31 July 1993)
19. Princess Lilian (28 November 1916 – 7 June 2002) – (Second wife of King Leopold III)
20. Prince Alexandre (18 July 1942 – 29 November 2009) – (Son of King Leopold III) – In a chapel next to the main crypt.
21. Queen Fabiola (11 June 1928 – 5 December 2014) – (Wife of King Baudouin)
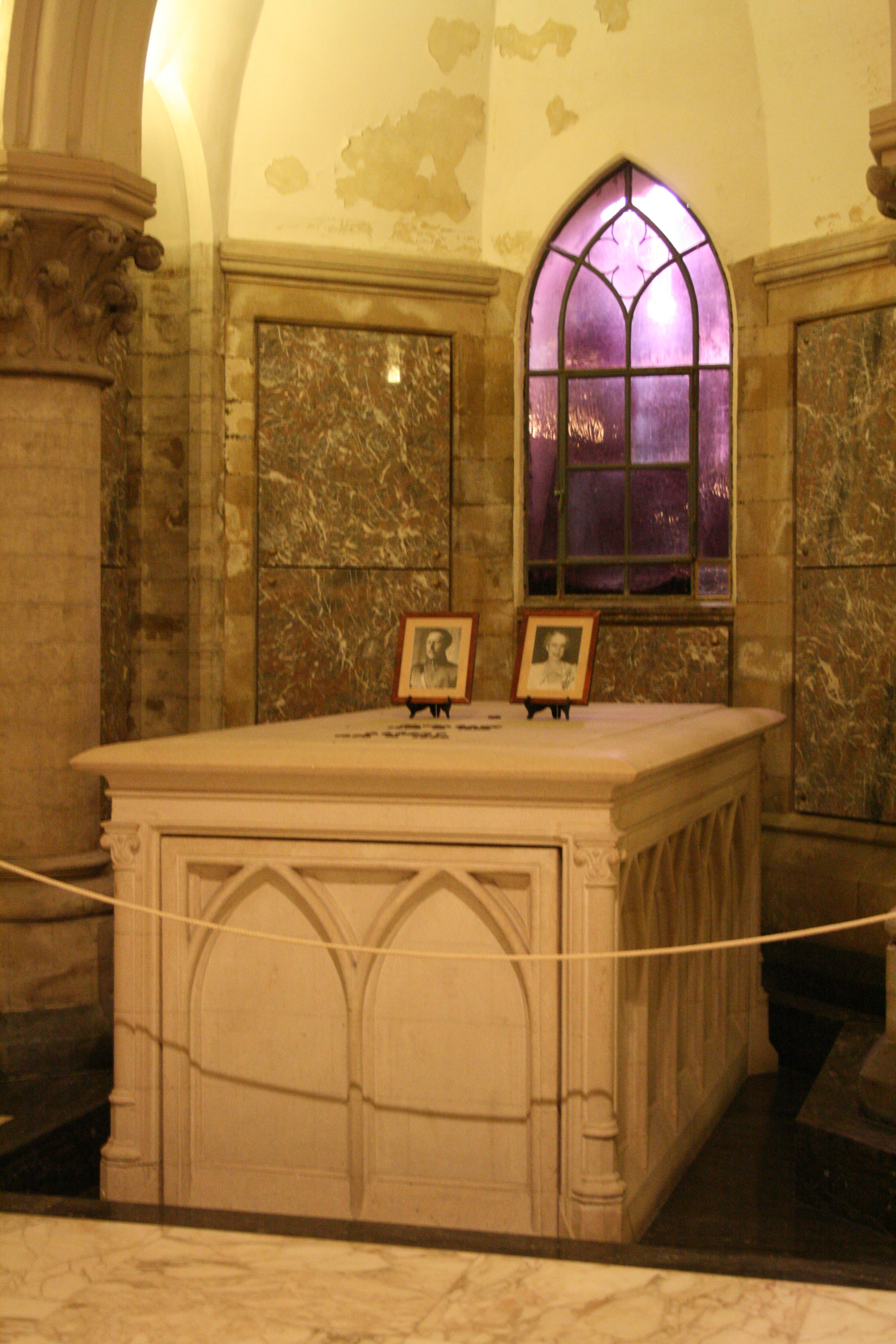
King Albert I and Queen Elisabeth

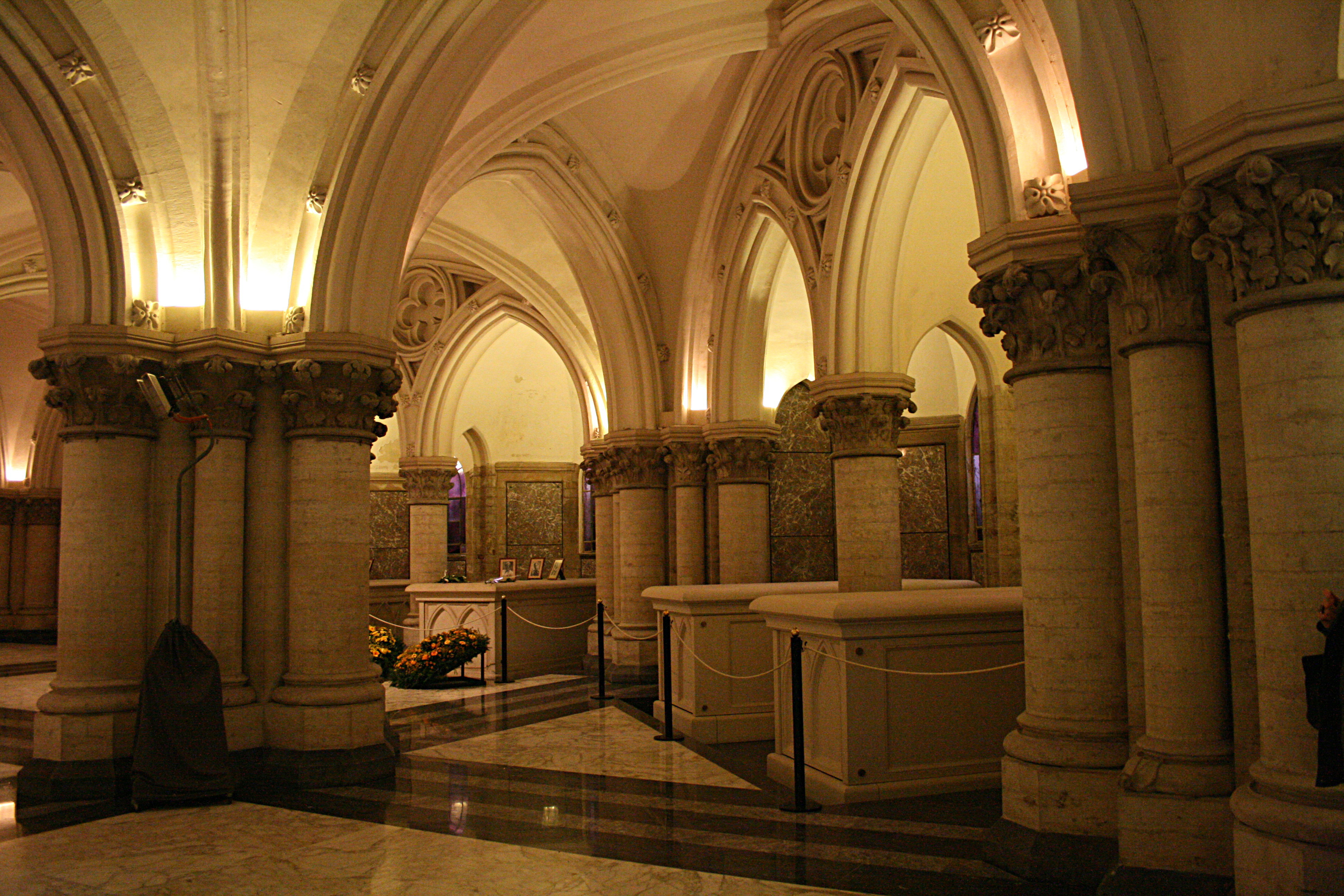
King Leopold III, Queen Astrid and Princess Lilian

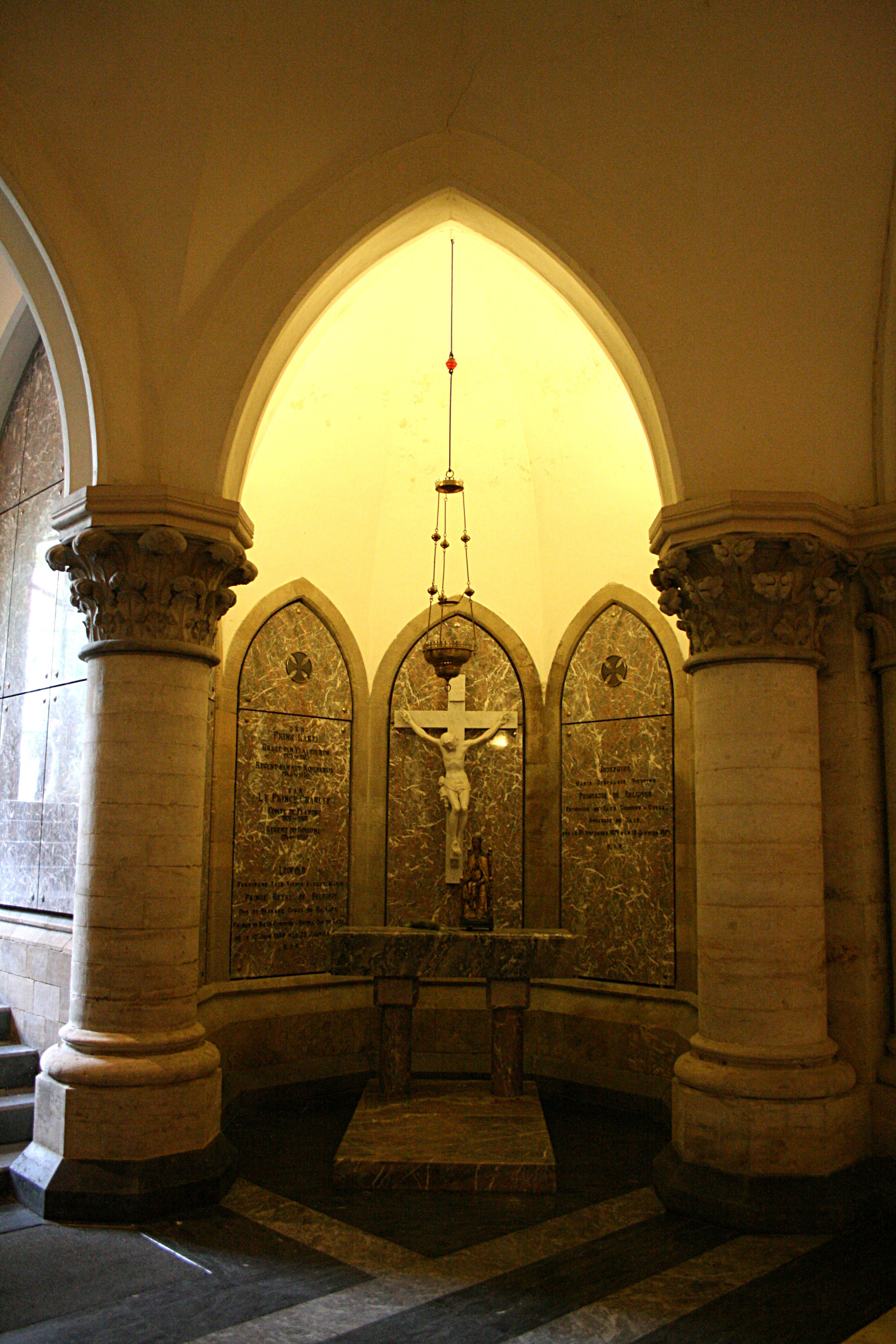
Prince Charles (left) and Princess Joséphine Marie (right)
