= List of heirs to the Belgian throne =

This page is a list of heirs to the Belgian throne. The list includes all individuals who were considered first in line to inherit the throne of Belgium, either as heir apparent or as heir presumptive. Those who succeeded as King or Queen of the Belgians are shown in bold.

== List of heirs ==
Heirs to the Belgian throne
Monarch	Heir	Relationship to monarch	Became heir (Date; Reason)	Ceased to be heir (Date; Reason)	Next in line of succession
Leopold I	None, 1831–1833				
Leopold I	Crown Prince Louis Philippe	Son	24 July 1833; Born	16 May 1834; Died	None
Leopold I	None, 1834–1835				
Leopold I	**Prince Leopold, Duke of Brabant**	Son	9 April 1835; Born	17 December 1865; Father died, became king	None, 1835–1837
Leopold I	**Prince Leopold, Duke of Brabant**	Son	9 April 1835; Born	17 December 1865; Father died, became king	Prince Philippe, Count of Flanders, 1837–1859, brother
Leopold I	**Prince Leopold, Duke of Brabant**	Son	9 April 1835; Born	17 December 1865; Father died, became king	Prince Leopold, Count of Hainaut, 1859–1865, son
Leopold II	Prince Leopold, Duke of Brabant	Son	17 December 1865; Father became king	22 January 1869; Died	Prince Philippe, Count of Flanders, uncle
Leopold II	Prince Philippe, Count of Flanders	Brother	22 January 1869; Nephew died	17 November 1905; Died	None, 1869
Leopold II	Prince Philippe, Count of Flanders	Brother	22 January 1869; Nephew died	17 November 1905; Died	Prince Baudouin, 1869–1891, son
Leopold II	Prince Philippe, Count of Flanders	Brother	22 January 1869; Nephew died	17 November 1905; Died	**Prince Albert**, 1891–1905, son
Leopold II	**Prince Albert**	Nephew	17 November 1905; Father died	23 December 1909; Uncle died, became king	**Prince Leopold**, son
Albert I	**Prince Leopold, Duke of Brabant**	Son	23 December 1909; Father became king	23 February 1934; Father died, became king	Prince Charles, Count of Flanders, 1909–1930, brother
Albert I	**Prince Leopold, Duke of Brabant**	Son	23 December 1909; Father became king	23 February 1934; Father died, became king	**Prince Baudouin, Count of Hainaut**, 1930–1934, son
Leopold III	**Prince Baudouin, Duke of Brabant**	Son	23 February 1934; Father became king	17 July 1951; Father abdicated, became king	Prince Charles, Count of Flanders, 1934, uncle
Leopold III	**Prince Baudouin, Duke of Brabant**	Son	23 February 1934; Father became king	17 July 1951; Father abdicated, became king	**Prince Albert, Prince of Liège**, 1934–1951, brother
Baudouin	**Prince Albert, Prince of Liège**	Brother	17 July 1951; Brother became king	9 August 1993; Brother died, became king	Prince Charles, Count of Flanders, 1951–1960, uncle
Baudouin	**Prince Albert, Prince of Liège**	Brother	17 July 1951; Brother became king	9 August 1993; Brother died, became king	**Prince Philippe**, 1960–1993, son
Albert II	**Prince Philippe, Duke of Brabant**	Son	9 August 1993; Father became king	21 July 2013; Father abdicated, became king	Princess Astrid, Archduchess of Austria-Este, 1993–2001, sister
Albert II	**Prince Philippe, Duke of Brabant**	Son	9 August 1993; Father became king	21 July 2013; Father abdicated, became king	Princess Elisabeth, 2001–2013, daughter
Philippe	Princess Elisabeth, Duchess of Brabant	Daughter	21 July 2013; Father became king	Incumbent	Prince Gabriel, brother

== See also ==
- Line of succession to the Belgian throne
