= Royal Crypt =

Royal Crypt may refer to:

- Royal Crypt (Belgium), burial place of Belgian monarchs
- Royal Crypt of Superga, burial place of Italian monarchs

== See also ==
- Burial sites of European monarchs and consorts
