= Joseph Poelaert =

Belgian architect

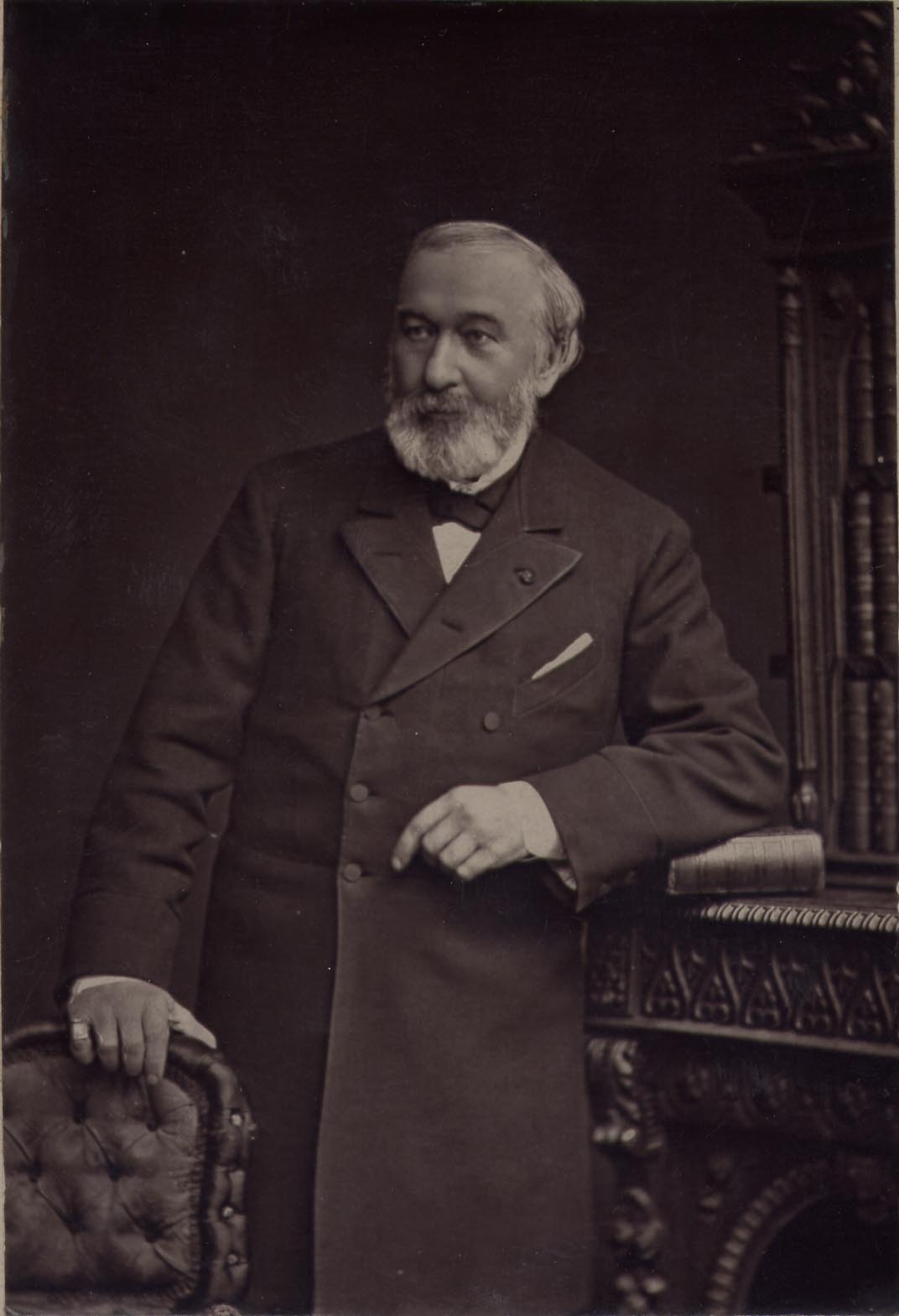
- Born: 21 March 1817; Brussels, Belgium
- Died: 3 November 1879 (aged 62); Brussels, Belgium
- Occupation: Architect
- Buildings: Palace of Justice of Brussels; Congress Column; Church of Our Lady of Laeken

Joseph Poelaert (21 March 1817 – 3 November 1879) was a Belgian architect. He was entrusted with important projects in Brussels, such as the Church of St. Catherine, the Church of Our Lady of Laeken, the Congress Column, the Royal Theatre of la Monnaie and above all, the Palace of Justice.

== Life ==
=== Early life ===
Joseph Poelaert was born in Brussels on 21 March 1817. His father was Philip Poelaert (1790–1875), a former architecture student at the Royal Academy of Fine Arts in Brussels. The young Poelaert also trained there under Tilman-François Suys, and then in Paris under Louis Visconti and Jean-Nicolas Huyot.

He first came to attention with his winning competition entry for the Congress Column in 1849. He was made city architect of Brussels in 1856.

=== Palace of Justice ===
Poelaert's most significant commission was the colossal Palace of Justice of Brussels, the largest single building constructed in the 19th century and even copied in smaller scale at the Palace of Justice in Lima, Peru.

For the Palace of Justice's construction, a section of the Marolles/Marollen neighbourhood was demolished. Poelaert himself resided in the Marolles, only a few hundred metres from the building, on the Rue des Minimes/Minimenstraat, in a house adjoining his vast offices and workshops and communicating with them. It is thus unlikely he saw himself as ruining the neighbourhood. Nonetheless, many angry citizens personally blamed Poelaert for the forced relocations, and the expression skieven architek (meaning "crooked architect") became one of the most serious insults in the dialect of the Marolles.

== Family ==
=== Marriage ===
At the age of 42, on 25 August 1859 in Brussels, Poelaert married Léonie Toussaint, aged 19, born in Ixelles on 30 March 1840, and died in Brussels on 23 July 1912, daughter of Joseph Ferdinand Toussaint, notary public in Brussels and former Member of Parliament and of Philippine Anne Catherine Joséphine Kuhne. She was also the sister of Fritz Toussaint, a painter, and of Jules Toussaint.

=== Later life and death ===
Poelaert retired in 1874 to his villa at the Grande Grille, on 363, avenue de la Reine/Koninginnelaan, in the then-rural village of Laeken. He died on 3 November 1879 and was buried in Laeken Cemetery under a miniature version of his Palace of Justice.

== Works ==
- 1850–1859: Congress Column in Brussels
- 1854–1874: Church of St. Catherine in Brussels
- 1854–1909: Church of Our Lady of Laeken in Brussels, site of the Royal Crypt of the Belgian royal family
- 1855–1857: Restoration of the Royal Theatre of La Monnaie in Brussels, after the fire of 1855
- 1866–1883: Palace of Justice in Brussels
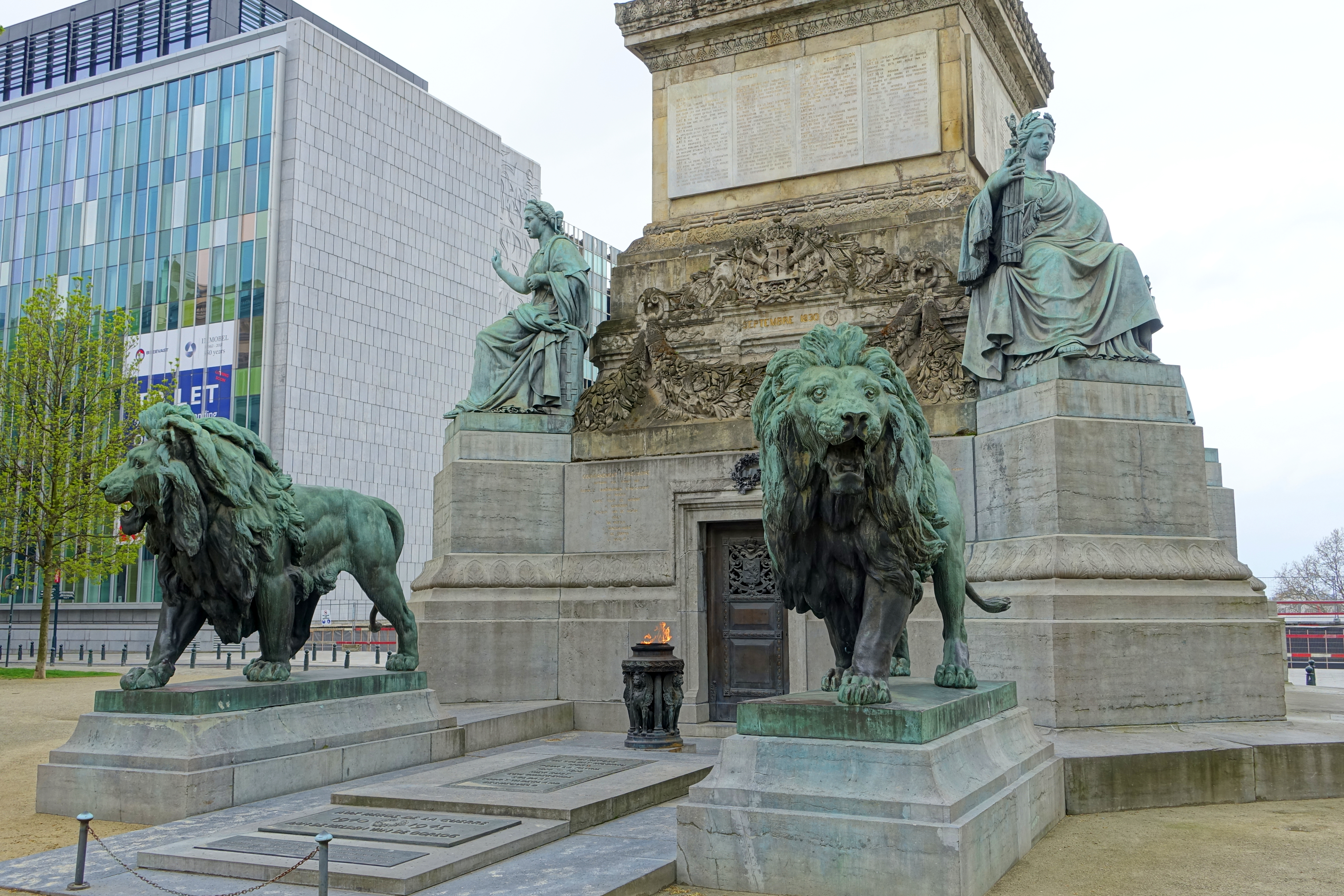
Pedestal of the Congress Column, Brussels (1850–1859)

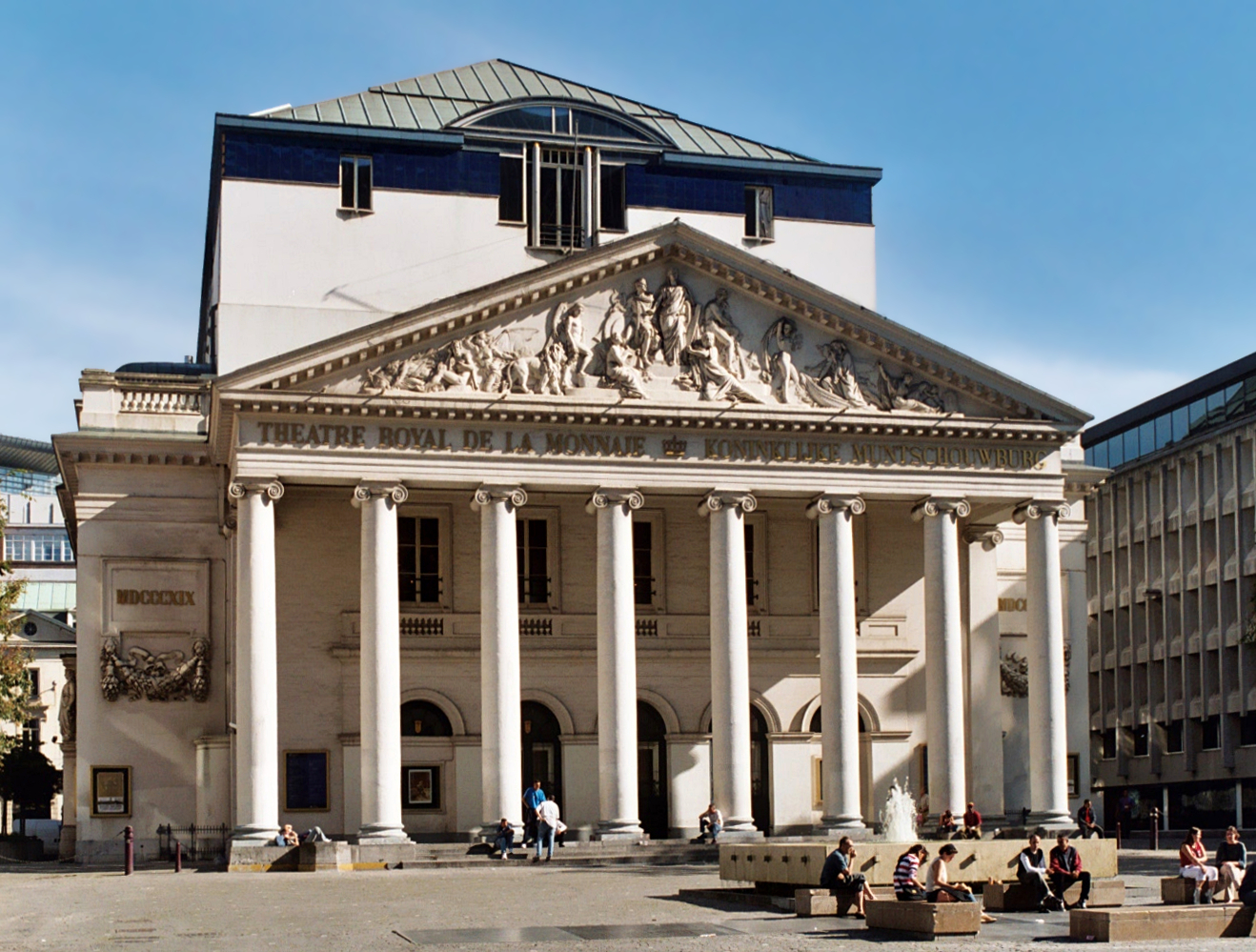
Royal Theatre of La Monnaie, Brussels (1855–1857)

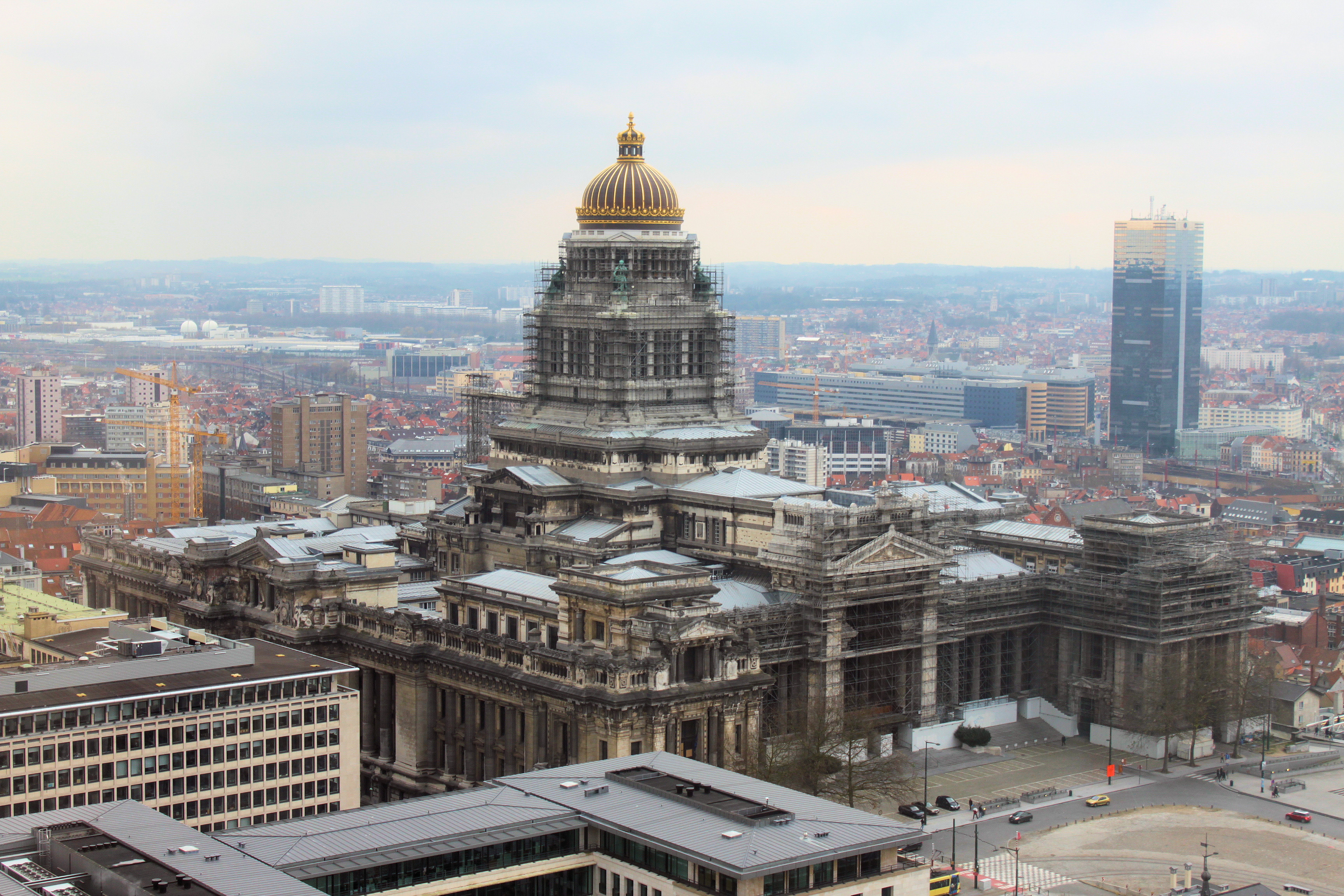
Palace of Justice, Brussels (1866–1883)

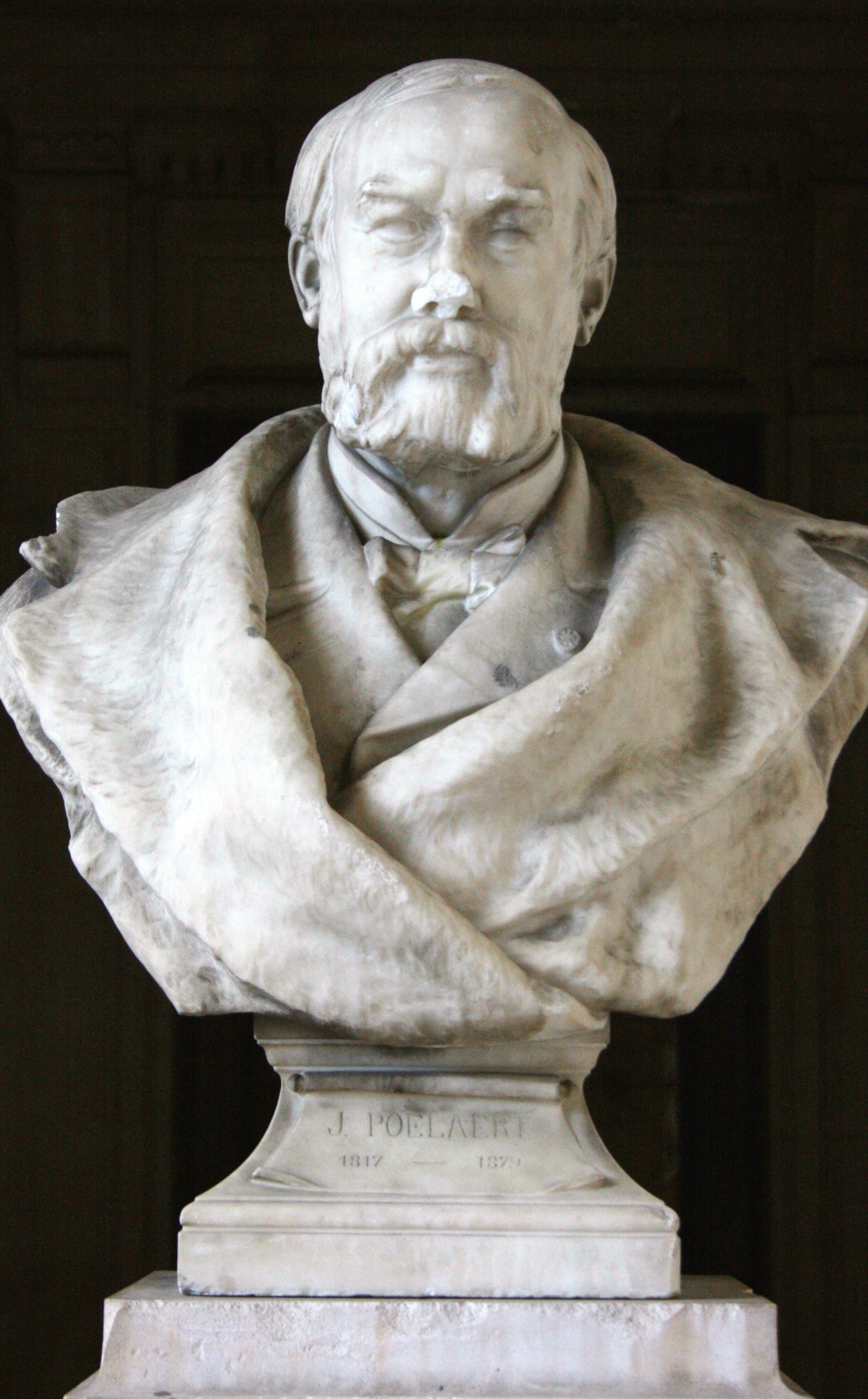
Bust of Poelaert at the Palace of Justice

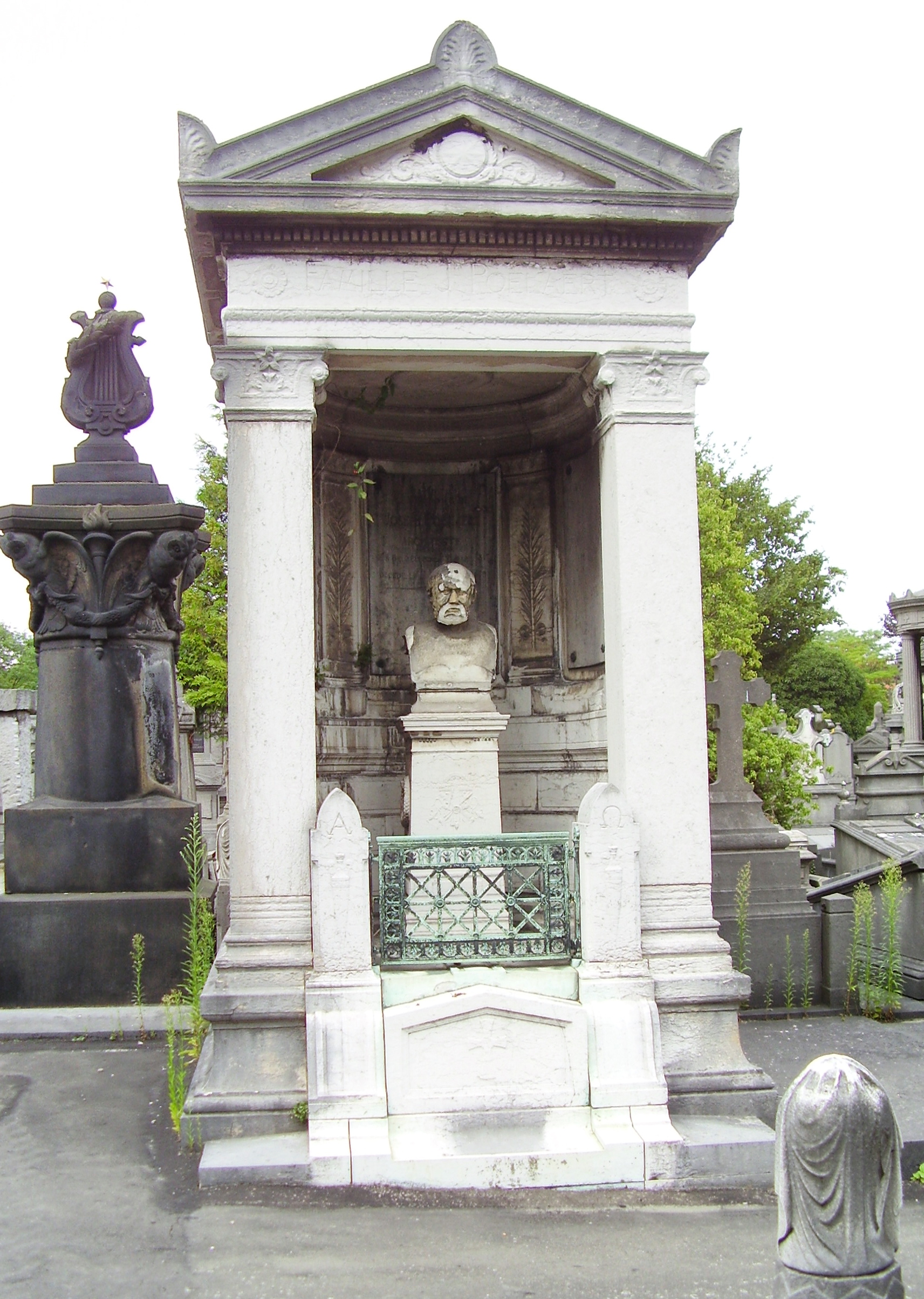
Poelaert's tomb in Laeken Cemetery, Brussels

Coat of arms of the Poelaert family
