= Church of Our Lady of Laeken =

Church in Brussels, Belgium

- Église Notre-Dame de Laeken (French); Onze-Lieve-Vrouwekerk van Laken (Dutch)
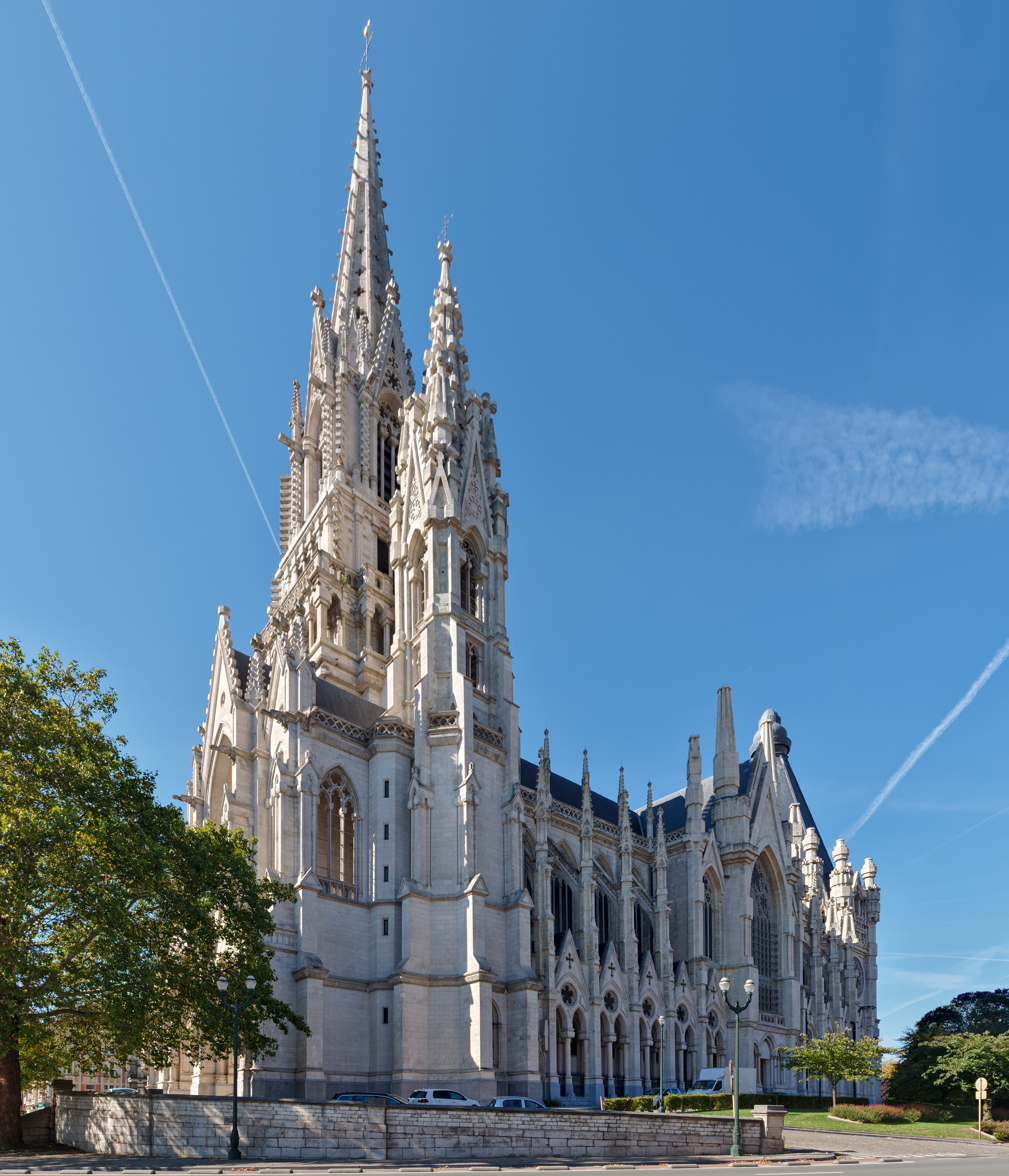
- Church of Our Lady of Laeken
- Church of Our Lady of Laeken
- 50°52′44.4″N 4°21′21.6″E
- Location: Laeken, City of Brussels, Brussels-Capital Region
- Country: Belgium
- Denomination: Catholic Church
- Website: Official website

History
- Status: Parish church
- Dedication: Our Lady of Laeken

Architecture
- Functional status: Active
- Architect: Joseph Poelaert
- Architectural type: Church
- Style: Gothic Revival
- Groundbreaking: 1854

Administration
- Archdiocese: Mechelen–Brussels

Clergy
- Archbishop: Luc Terlinden (Primate of Belgium)

The Church of Our Lady of Laeken (French: Église Notre-Dame de Laeken; Dutch: Onze-Lieve-Vrouwekerk van Laken) is a Catholic parish church in the Brussels district of Laeken, Belgium. Built in neo-Gothic style, it was originally erected in memoriam of Queen Louise-Marie, wife of King Leopold I, to the design of the architect Joseph Poelaert. It is dedicated to Our Lady of Laeken.

Pope Pius XI granted a decree of pontifical coronation towards the venerated Marian image enshrined within the church on 8 September 1935. The rite of coronation was executed by the former Archbishop of Mechelen, Cardinal Jozef-Ernest van Roey on 17 May 1936.

The Royal Crypt underneath the shrine is the main resting place for the members of the Belgian royal family, with some notable artisans also interred at the nearby cemetery.

== History ==
=== Inception and construction ===
An older painting of Our Lady of Laeken, dating back to 1637, is preserved at the site. A devotional booklet dedicated to this Marian title was published with imprimatur by the Catholic deacon in Brussels, Pastor Hubert Cœkelberghs, on 17 July 1874.

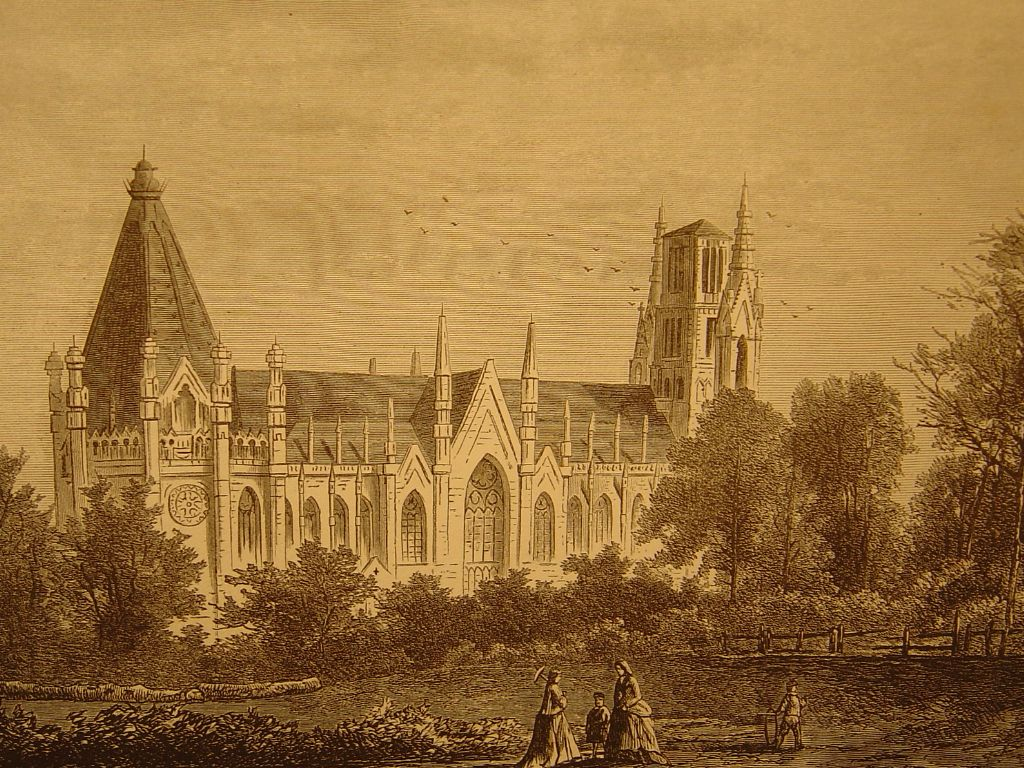
The Church of Our Lady of Laeken in 1872. Note the missing spire.

Queen Louise-Marie, wife of King Leopold I, died in Ostend in 1850 and wished to be buried in Laeken. The nearby Palace of Laeken was, and still is, the royal residence. Leopold I wished the church to be constructed in her memory and as a mausoleum for her. By royal decree of 14 October 1850, the Belgian government authorised the construction of the edifice and organised a competition, the rules of which stipulated that the church should be able to contain 2,000 people and that its price should not exceed 800,000 Belgian francs.

The architect Joseph Poelaert was chosen to design the new church. He later became best known for the Law Courts of Brussels. The project initially selected was a fairly simple brick building with stone bands and whose façade was surmounted by a single spire covered with slate. In 1853, the jury proposed to modify the project in the direction of greater monumentality, with a neo-Gothic façade with three spires. This led to an overrun of the initial budget, which was the first of a long series.

The first stone was laid by Leopold I in 1854. In 1865, Poelaert, absorbed by the Law Courts project since 1862, claimed health problems and gave up the management of the works. Several architects succeeded him: Auguste Payen, Antoine Trappeniers, Louis de Curte and Alphonse Groothaert.

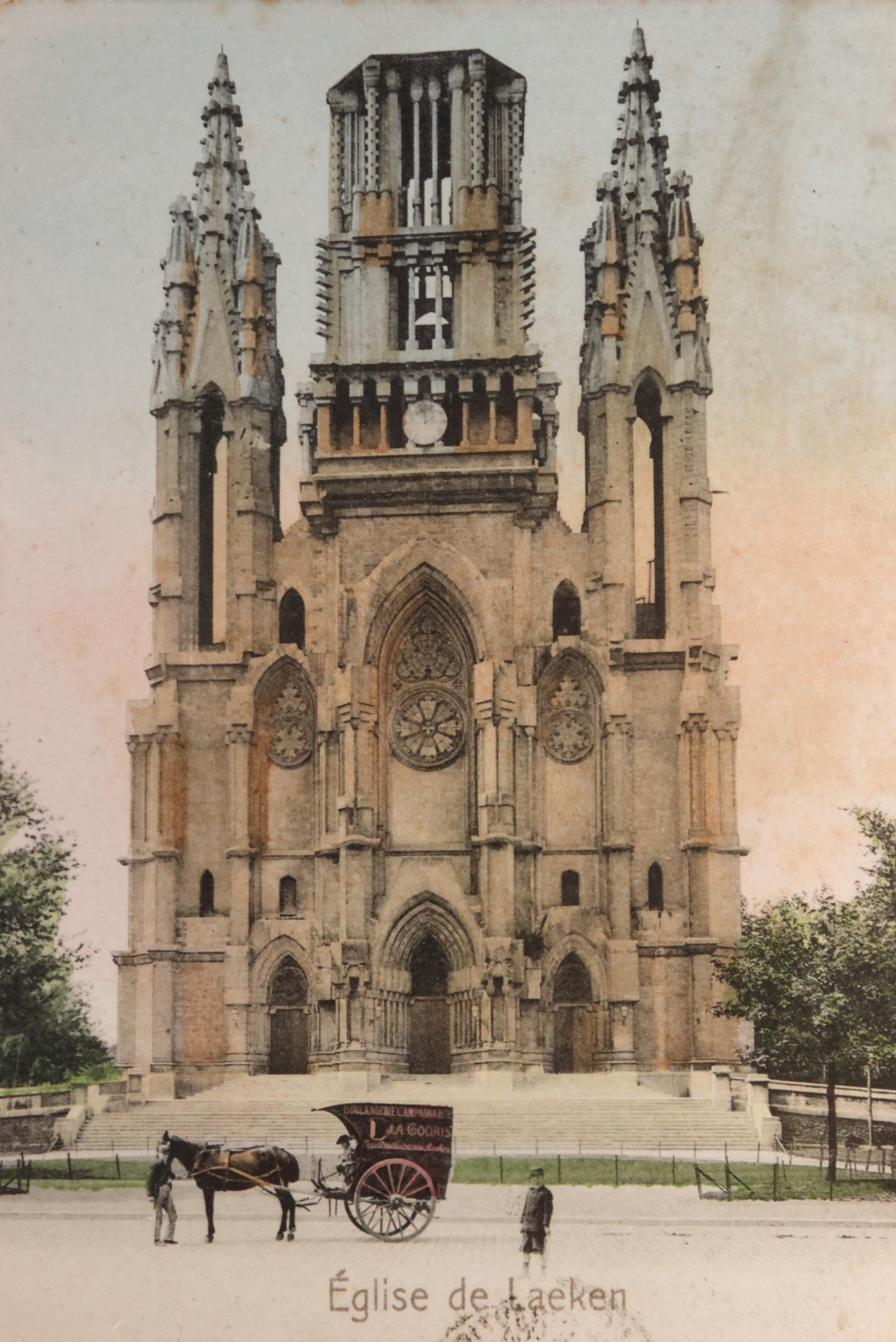
The church before the 1909–1911 completion works

The church is monumental, and although consecrated in 1872, apart from maintenance and consolidation works, its completion was resumed only after a lengthy interruption. In 1896, concerned about the embellishment of the place, King Leopold II relaunched the project, which was still compromised by the lack of funds. In 1902, as the building continued to deteriorate, a Munich architect, Baron Heinrich von Schmidt, was commissioned to carry out a general examination of its condition. In 1907, the government approved his plan to complete the main façade, the monumental porches and the central tower. This work was carried out from 1909 to 1911.

=== Renovation ===
In 2003, a restoration project began on the front façade and the three towers (2003–2006), the roofs (2007–2009) and the side façades (2010–2012). During this restoration, the architectural office MA² - Metzger et Associés Architecture, specialising in historic buildings, advised against any carving, at the risk of causing irreversible damage to the ageing stones. All that was done was to treat the exterior of the church against acid rain.

== Marian cult and veneration ==
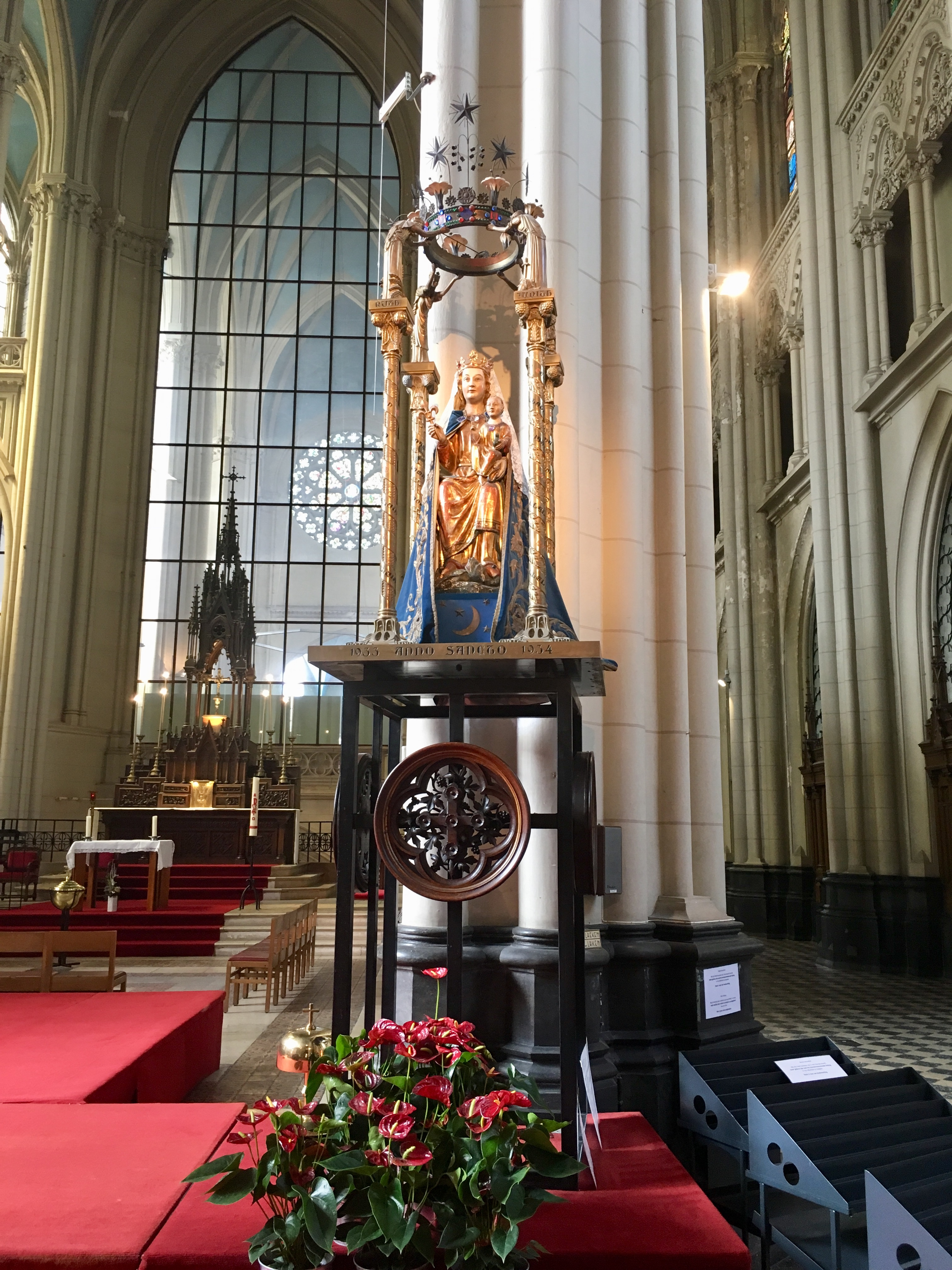
The Marian image venerated within the church. Pope Pius XI crowned this image on 17 May 1936.

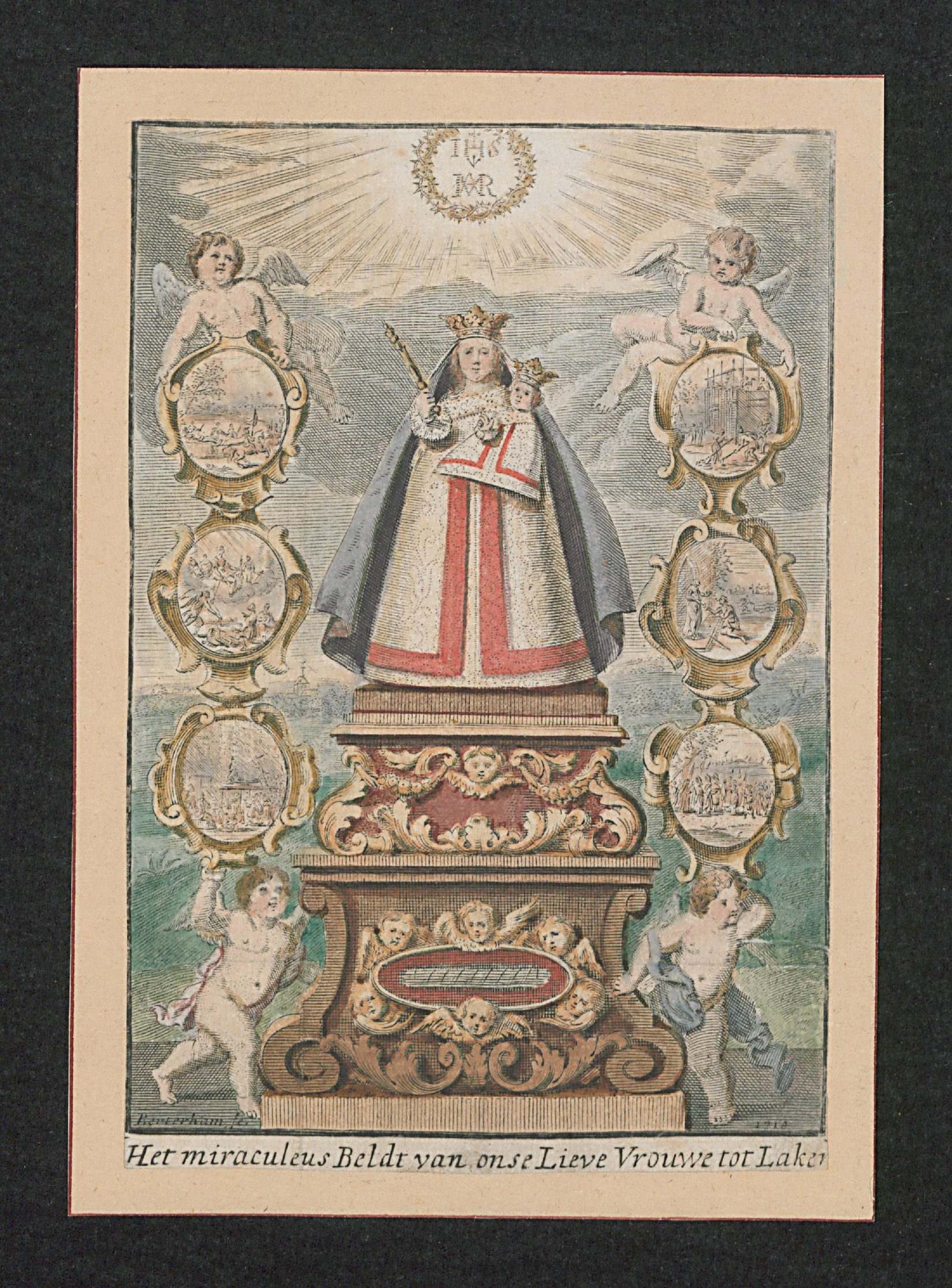
An image of Our Lady of Laeken (1710) by the Flemish artisan Jan Baptiste Berterham

The Marian image is a 13th-century wooden carved statue in the Romanesque style as the Sedes Sapientiae (English: Seat of Wisdom), with the enthroned Madonna and Child holding a scepter of Fleur-de-lys and a dove (representing a soul), respectively. The image is vested with imperial regalia of blue velvet fabric with golden embroidery and surrounded by four pillars with inscriptions bearing various Marian titles from the Song of Songs. Pious legends claim that Archduke Leopold Wilhelm of Austria moved this image in 1652 to the Collegiate Church of St. Michael and St. Gudula (future cathedral of Brussels) due to a long drought, and was later returned to Laeken, where it rained.

The ornamental crown with canopy was added in 1934, and is carried by the four Biblical women: Ruth, Judith, Eve and Esther. A marker for the Holy Year in 1934 is also inscribed on the front, commemorating the 1900th anniversary of the Holy Passion of Jesus Christ. Pope Pius XI issued the Pontifical decree to crown the venerated image on 8 September 1935. The rite of coronation was executed on 17 May 1936 by the Primate of Belgium in the presence of King Leopold III and his royal heirs. The young Prince Baudouin (aged five) personally served as the pillow-bearer carrying the golden diadem of the coronation rite.

Accordingly, this venerated Marian image became the source for the image of Our Lady of China, crowned by a decree of Pope Francis on 19 February 2021.

== Royal Crypt ==
The Royal Crypt underneath the church holds the tombs of the Belgian royal family, including those of all the Kings of the Belgians and their wives. These tombs include:

- Leopold I of Belgium
- Louise of Orléans
- Prince Baudouin of Belgium
- Prince Leopold, Duke of Brabant
- Marie Henriette of Austria
- Leopold II of Belgium
- Princess Marie of Hohenzollern-Sigmaringen
- Charlotte of Belgium, later known as Carlota of Mexico, empress consort of Emperor Maximilian I of Mexico
- Albert I of Belgium
- Astrid of Sweden
- Elisabeth of Bavaria
- Prince Charles, Count of Flanders
- Leopold III of Belgium
- Baudouin of Belgium
- Lilian, Princess of Réthy
- Prince Alexandre of Belgium
- Fabiola de Mora y Aragon

The adjacent Laeken Cemetery behind the church is known as the Belgian Père Lachaise because it is the burial place of the major Catholic nobility, important families and some famous artists.

== Gallery ==
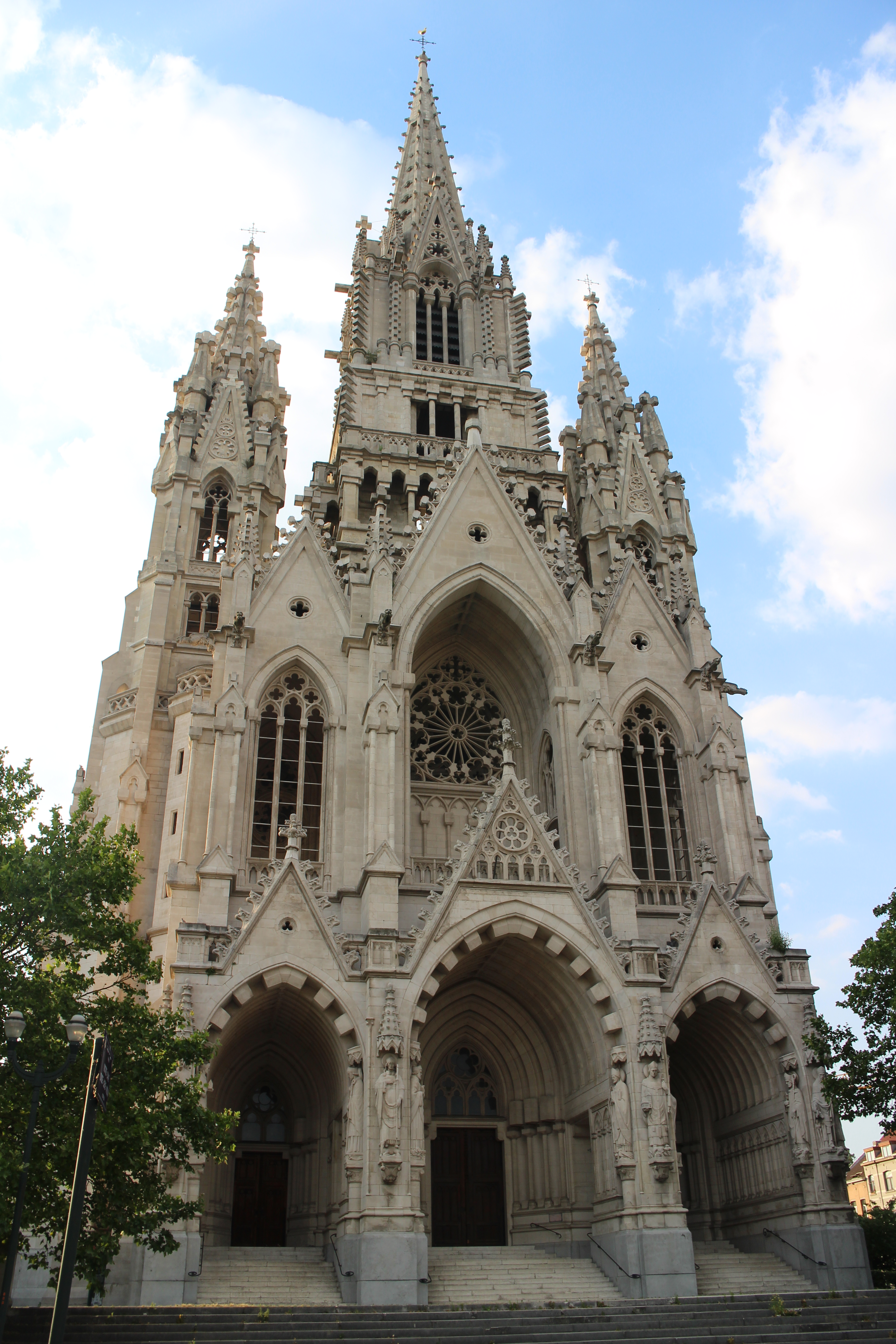
Frontal view

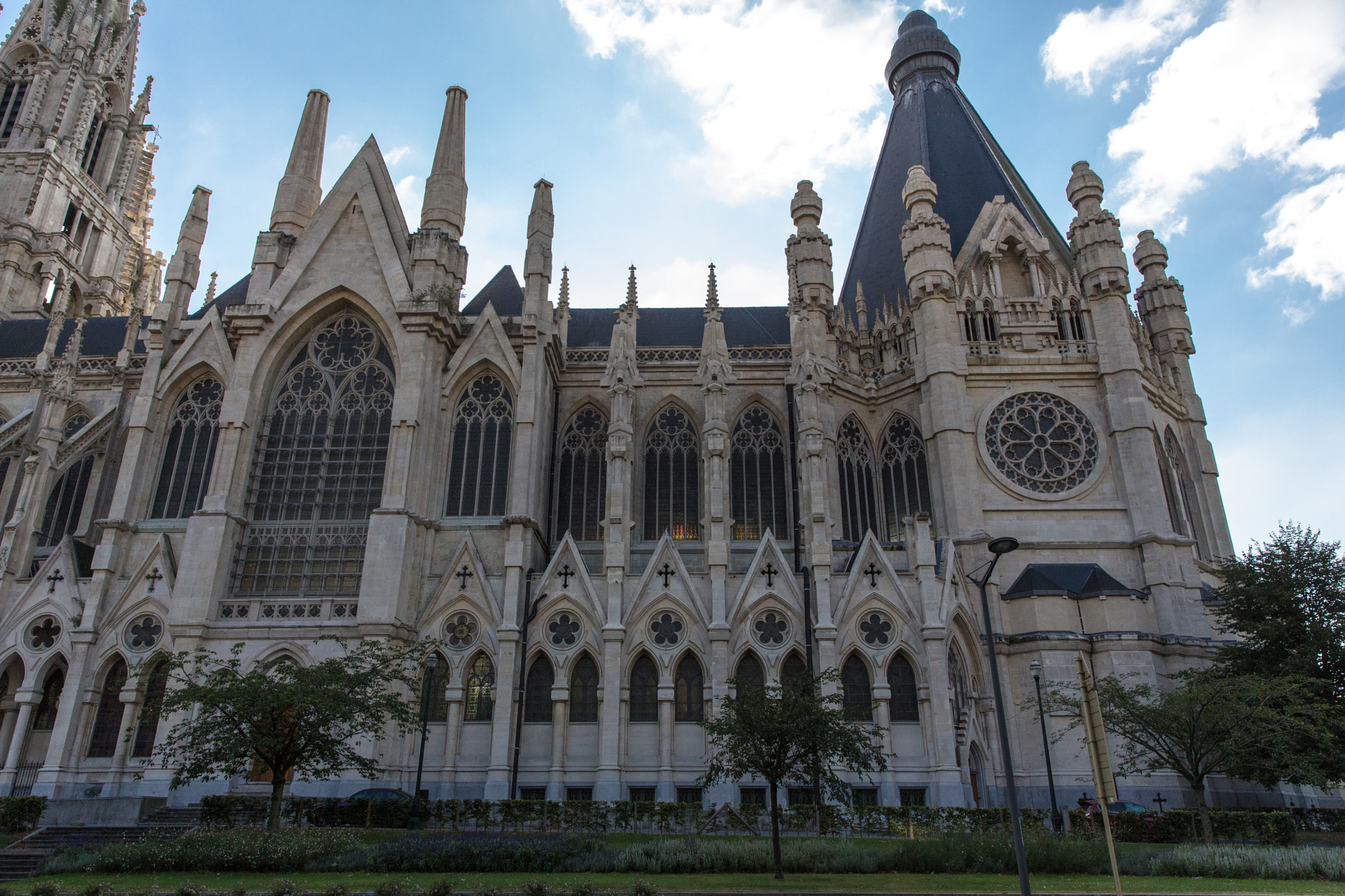
Lateral view

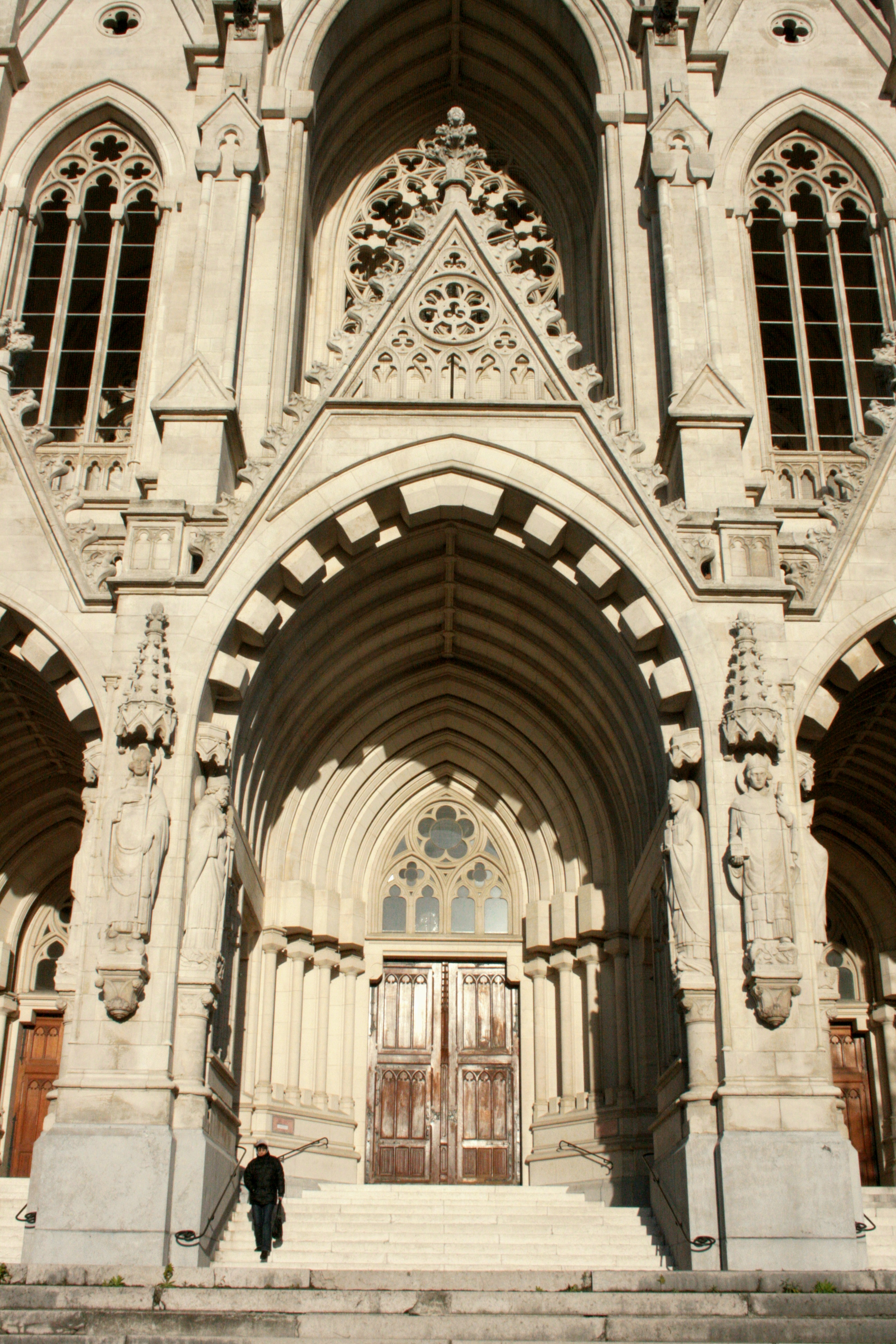
Main portal

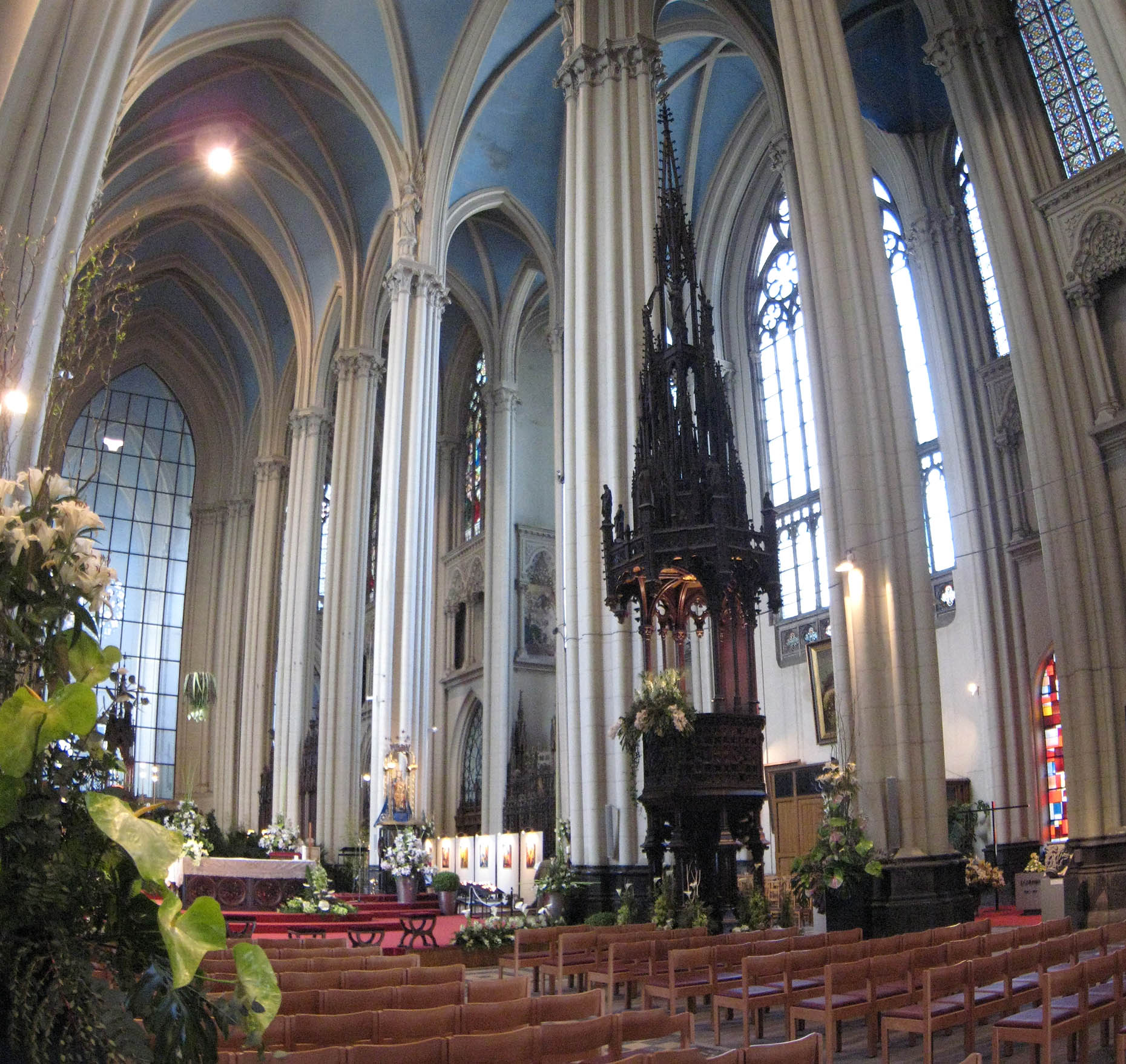
Interior

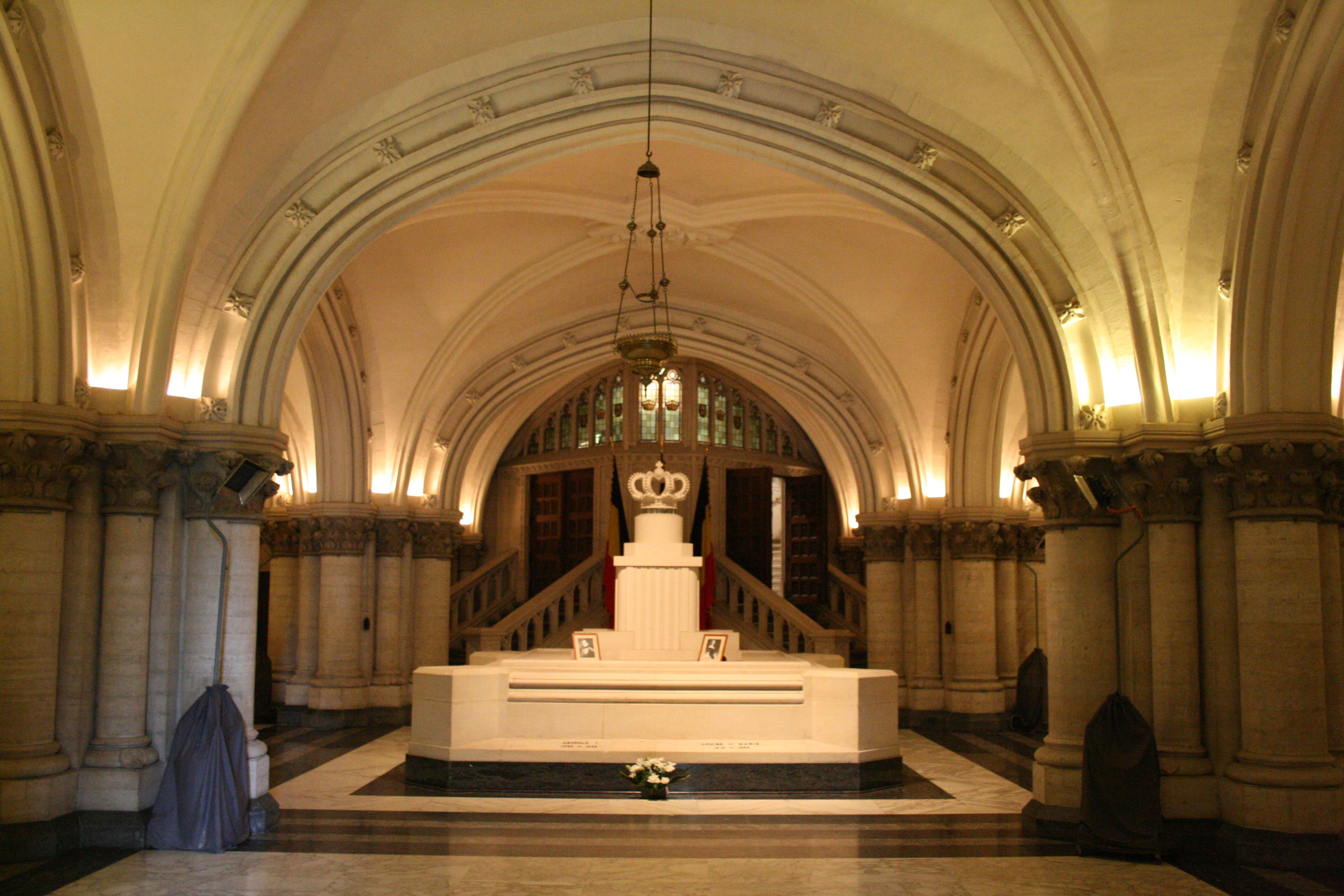
Royal Crypt

== See also ==
- List of churches in Brussels
- Catholic Church in Belgium
- History of Brussels
- Culture of Belgium
- Belgium in the long nineteenth century
