= Louis Philippe, Crown Prince of Belgium =

Heir apparent to Leopold I (1833–1834)

Louis Philippe
- Crown Prince of Belgium
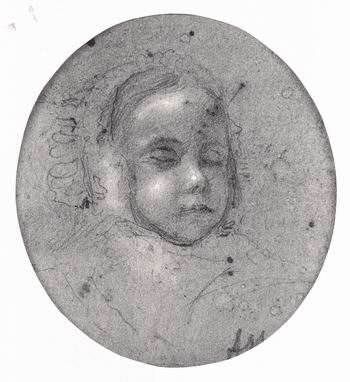
- Louis Philippe in 1834
- Born: 24 July 1833; Laeken Palace, Laeken, Brussels, Belgium
- Died: 16 May 1834 (9 months 22 days); Laeken Palace, Laeken, Brussels, Belgium
- Burial: Church of Our Lady of Laeken
Names
- French: Louis Philippe Léopold Victor Ernest; Dutch: Lodewijk Filips Leopold Victor Ernst; German: Ludwig Philipp Leopold Viktor Ernst
- House: Saxe-Coburg and Gotha
- Father: Leopold I of Belgium
- Mother: Louise of Orléans

Louis-Philippe, Crown Prince of Belgium (Louis Philippe Léopold Victor Ernest; 24 July 1833 – 16 May 1834), was the eldest child and heir-apparent of King Leopold I of the Belgians and his second wife, Princess Louise of Orléans.

== Life ==
Louis-Philippe became crown prince at birth in Laeken. The baby was baptised at the Church of St. Michael and St. Gudula in Brussels by Engelbert Sterckx, the Archbishop of Mechelen-Brussels. He was named after his maternal grandfather, Louis-Philippe I, King of the French, his father, and his cousin, Queen Victoria. He was nicknamed "Babochon".

== Death ==
Louis-Philippe died in Laeken before his first birthday of an inflammation of the mucous membranes. He was buried in the royal crypt of the Church of Our Lady of Laeken.

Unlike subsequent heirs apparent to the Belgian throne, Louis-Philippe was not Duke of Brabant; this title was not created for the heir-apparent to the throne until 1840. He was followed as crown prince upon the birth of his younger brother, Leopold, who would later succeed their father as Leopold II, King of the Belgians.
