= Marie Henriette of Austria =

Queen of the Belgians from 1865 to 1902

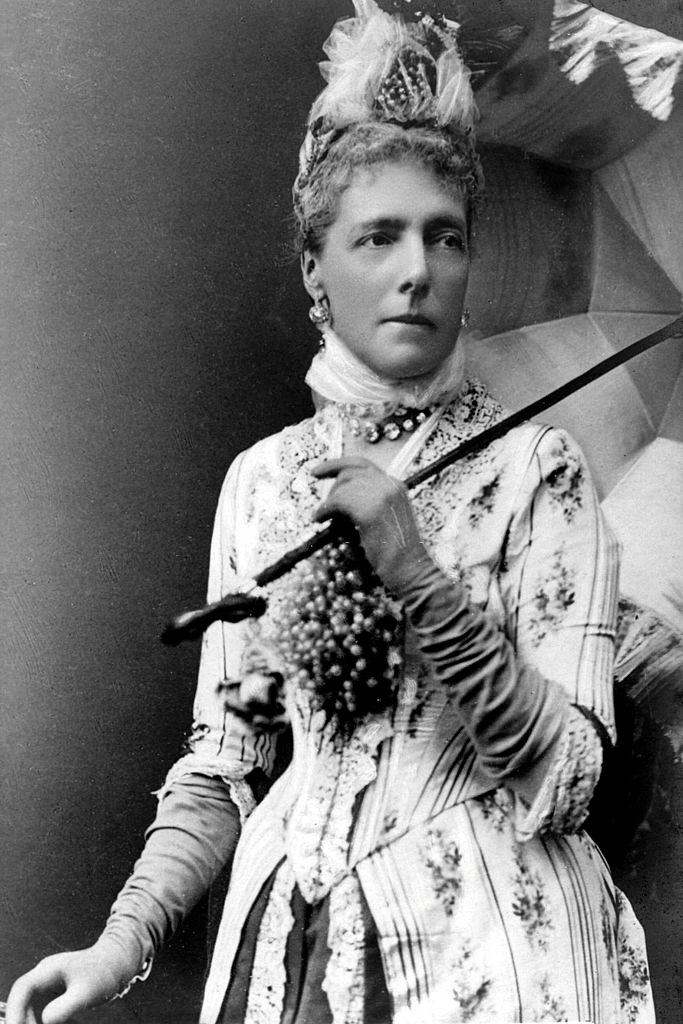
- The Queen in 1875

Queen consort of the Belgians
- Tenure: 10 December 1865 – 19 September 1902
- Born: 23 August 1836; Buda Castle, Buda, Kingdom of Hungary, Austrian Empire
- Died: 19 September 1902 (aged 66); Hôtel du Midi, Spa, Belgium
- Burial: Church of Our Lady of Laeken
- Spouse: Leopold II of Belgium (m. 1853)
- Issue: Louise, Princess Philipp of Saxe-Coburg and Gotha; Prince Leopold, Duke of Brabant; Stéphanie, Crown Princess of Austria; Clémentine, Princess Napoléon
Names
- Marie Henriette Anne
- House: Habsburg-Lorraine
- Father: Archduke Joseph, Palatine of Hungary
- Mother: Duchess Maria Dorothea of Württemberg

Marie Henriette of Austria (Marie Henriette Anne; 23 August 1836 – 19 September 1902) was Queen of the Belgians as the wife of King Leopold II. The marriage was arranged against the will of both Marie Henriette and Leopold and became unhappy due to their dissimilarity, and after 1872 the couple lived separate lives, though they continued to appear together in public. Queen Marie Henriette was described as an energetic and intelligent horsewoman, foremost devoted to her animals. In 1895, she openly retired from public life and lived her last seven years in the city of Spa, where she became known as "The Queen of Spa".

== Early life ==
Marie Henriette was the youngest of five children from the marriage of Archduke Joseph, Palatine of Hungary, and Duchess Maria Dorothea of Württemberg. Marie Henriette was a cousin of Emperor Ferdinand I of Austria, and granddaughter of Leopold II, Holy Roman Emperor, through her father. She was also a first cousin, once removed to the future Queen Mary of the United Kingdom through her mother.

Her father was Palatine of Hungary, and she spent a great deal of her childhood in the Buda Castle in Hungary. She lost her father at the age of ten. After her father's death, she became a ward of Archduke John of Austria at the Palais Augarten in Vienna. It was said that she was raised by her mother "as a boy". Marie Henriette was a vivid and energetic person with a strong will and a hot temperament, interested in riding.

== Marriage ==
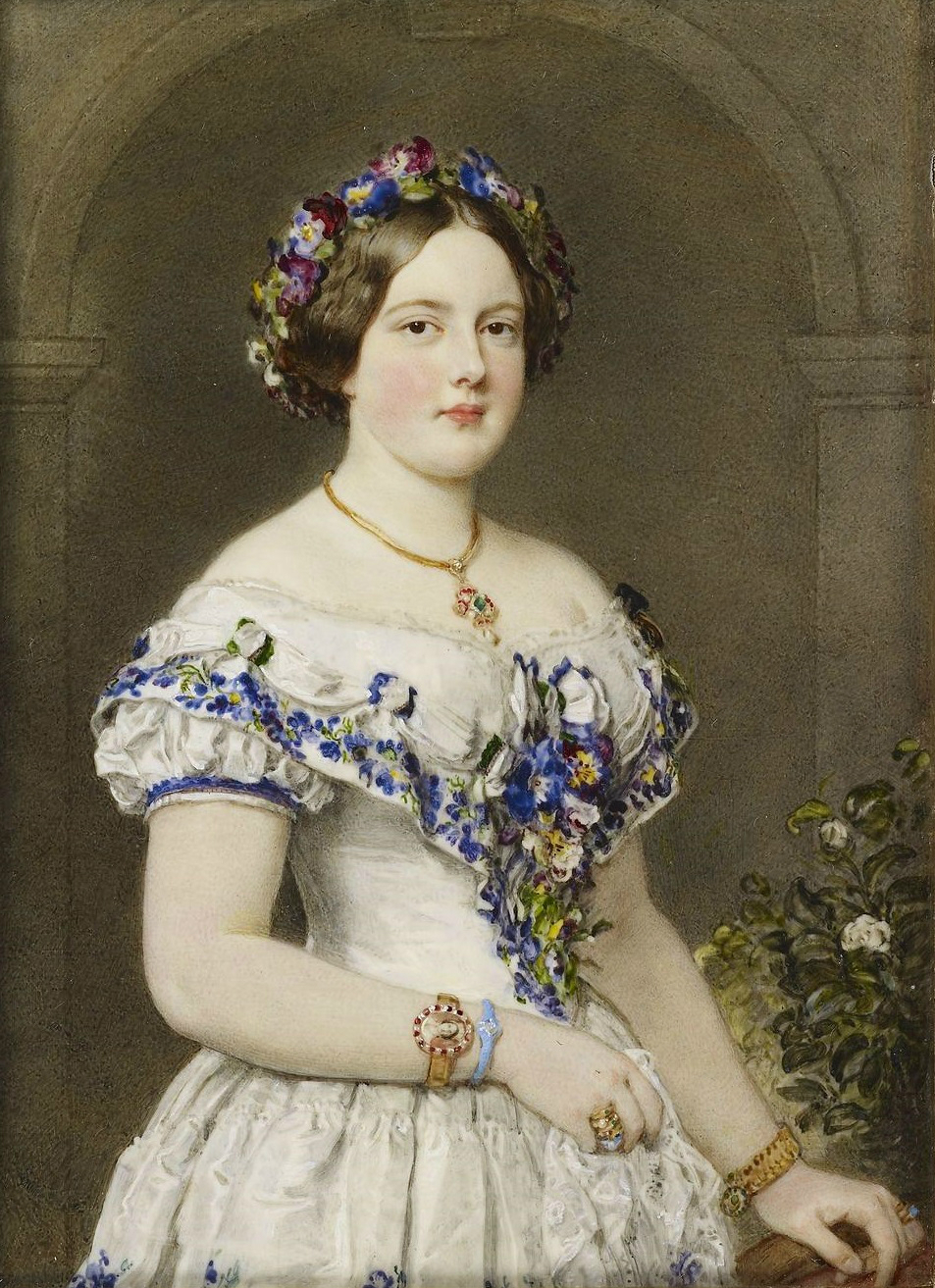
Portrait of Marie Henriette by William Charles Ross (1853)

One day before her 17th birthday, she married 18-year-old Prince Leopold of Belgium, the heir to the throne, on 22 August 1853. Leopold was the second-surviving son of King Leopold I of the Belgians and his French wife, Louise of Orléans; Marie Henriette was the sister-in-law of Charlotte of Belgium, future Empress of Mexico and a cousin by marriage to Victoria of the United Kingdom and Maria II of Portugal. The marriage was arranged to strengthen the status of the Belgian Monarchy. As the former Protestant monarch of a newly established monarchy, the Belgian king wished his son to marry a member of a Roman Catholic and prestigious dynasty, and the name Habsburg was one of her more important qualities. The marriage furthermore created a historical link between the new Kingdom of Belgium and the Habsburg dynasty of the Austrian Netherlands.

The marriage was suggested by her future father-in-law, King Leopold I, to her guardian, the Archduke John of Austria, and arranged by the two men over her head. She was introduced to Leopold at an Imperial court ball at the Hofburg in May 1853, and she was informed that she was to marry him. Neither she nor Leopold made a good impression on each other. She protested against the marriage plans without success, but was convinced to submit to it by her mother. Leopold himself also commented that he had agreed to the marriage because of his father.

Marie Henriette renounced her rights to the Austrian throne and signed the marriage contract in Vienna on 8 August 1853. A wedding by proxy was celebrated at the Schönbrunn Palace on 10 August, after which she travelled to Brussels, where the final ceremony was celebrated with Leopold in person on 22 August. The wedding was followed by a tour through the Belgian provinces and a trip to Great Britain in October. Queen Victoria commented to king Leopold I about the differences between the couple. Marie Henriette was described as intelligent, well educated and cultivated, Leopold as well-spoken and interested in military issues, but with no common interests whatsoever. The marriage was arranged against the will of both Marie Henriette and Leopold and was to be unhappy from the start.

== Duchess of Brabant ==
In April 1854, Leopold and Marie Henriette settled in the Palace of Laeken as duke and duchess of Brabant. The couple lived with the king and his younger children Philippe and Charlotte. Marie Henriette did not have a close relationship with her father-in-law the king, but was to become a personal friend of Charlotte. Marie Henriette was given her own household, with her mother-in-law's former Dame d'honneur (principal lady-in-waiting) the comtesse de Mérode. She devoted herself to her interest in animals. She was interested in horses and riding, owning about fifty horses, and also in other animals. She attempted the breeding of monkeys, as well as dog breeding, and kept parrots and fish. She also cultivated her interest in music and took lessons in singing, piano and the harp.

The Duke of Brabant recommended trips to a warmer climate for health reasons. Marie Henriette accompanied him on his 1855 trip to Egypt via Vienna, Trieste and Corfu, and from Egypt to Jerusalem. Marie Henriette and her spouse made a state visit to France to attend the Exposition Universelle (1855). During their visit, their dissimilarities were again the cause of comment. Marie Henriette was described as strong, vivid and energetic and Leopold as serious, dry and physically weak: Marie Henriette as extrovert, Leopold as introvert. Pauline de Metternich wrote that theirs was a marriage "between a stable boy and a nun, and by nun I mean the Duke of Brabant".

In 1856, her cousin Archduke Maximilian visited the Belgian court to meet his future wife, Marie Henriette's sister-in-law Charlotte. He estimated that Marie Henriette must have had help from her lively intelligence to overcome many sensitive situations and that she brought some life to the Belgian royal family.

In 1858, Marie Henriette gave birth to her first child. The fact that the child was a girl was a cause of disappointment. The future heir to the throne was finally born in 1859. In 1860 and in 1864, Leopold made two more long health trips, this time without Marie Henriette, the last trip to Egypt, Ceylon, India and China. Both trips were made when Marie Henriette was pregnant, and she expressed her disappointment in being left at home with the children while he was making long journeys to faraway lands.

== Queen ==
On 10 December 1865, King Leopold I died and was succeeded by his son Leopold II, making Marie Henriette queen. When the king was enthroned, there were questions as to whether Marie Henriette should participate, but the king refused and the queen was instead reduced to being a spectator at the ceremony.

Marie Henriette and Leopold still lived together during the first seven years as king and queen, but their relationship was distant, and Leopold was described as a polite but authoritarian husband. Marie Henriette was interested in opera and theatre and often visited the Royal Theatre of La Monnaie, where the royal box was extended with a private room where the queen could socialize with a circle of private friends she gathered over the years.

In 1867, her sister-in-law, Empress Charlotte of Mexico, was imprisoned for mental instability by her in-laws, the Habsburgs. Marie Henriette was given the assignment by Leopold to negotiate Charlotte's release to Belgium. She went to Vienna with her advisor, Freiherr Adrien Goffinet, and succeeded in her task after a fortnight of negotiations. Charlotte initially stayed with the royal couple at Laeken, where Marie Henriette reportedly hardly left her side and devoted herself to improving her health. Charlotte did show some signs of improvement, but when she regressed again, Marie Henriette lost patience and, in 1869, Charlotte was permanently removed from Laeken.

In 1869, the only son of the royal couple died. Marie Henriette did not show her grief as openly as Leopold, but made several journeys to Switzerland and Hungary without Leopold to mourn, and developed an interest in religion. The king and queen temporarily reconciled in hopes of having another son, but when their efforts resulted in the birth of another daughter, Clementine, in 1872, they lived separately for the rest of their lives, though officially still married. Leopold II accused Marie Henriette of the death of their son, an accusation she could not forgive. She was also humiliated by Leopold's open adultery. After 1872 they were no longer personally involved with each other but continued to appear in public as king and queen. The wedding anniversary of the king and queen in August 1878 was the subject of national celebrations all over Belgium: festivals were arranged, public buildings decorated and four holidays declared. Marie Henriette was given a tiara financed by the contributions of citizens through a public committee, and the queen held a patriotic speech in gratitude.

Queen Marie Henriette was interested in music and painting. Her main interest was in her Hungarian horses. She did not keep horses only for riding but was actively engaged in their breeding. She also personally tended to their needs, something which was not customary for a royal woman to do in this time period and was considered eccentric.

The queen was interested in military issues and often attended the military drill at Beverloo in the east of Belgium, on her Hungarian horse which she had named Beverloo. During the Franco-Prussian War of 1870–1871, she engaged in medical care. While Belgium did not participate in the war, the queen devoted herself to the care of the foreign wounded soldiers from the war who passed their borders. She convinced the king to open the royal palace in Brussels as a hospital for the wounded soldiers after the Battle of Sedan, and personally attended to the wounded there. Her efforts were recognized and King John I of Saxony awarded her the Sidonie Order as an acknowledgement. She was also engaged in the care of those suffering during the smallpox epidemic in Brussels in 1871.

After the death of her son, Marie Henriette left the care of her children almost entirely to governesses and tutors who reportedly abused their authority and treated them badly, while their mother became a distant figure to them and approved of the tutors' strict disciplinarian methods. She wished for her daughters to enter dynastic marriages. She was pleased with Louise's marriage because it gave her the opportunity to visit the Kingdom of Hungary, her childhood home, often. She was pleased over her daughter Stephanie's prestigious marriage to Rudolf, Crown Prince of Austria, in 1881. When their son-in-law, Crown Prince Rudolf, committed suicide in the Mayerling incident in January 1889, Marie Henriette and Leopold ignored the ban from the Austrian Emperor and attended his funeral. She supported a marriage between her last daughter Clementine and her husband's nephew, the Belgian heir presumptive, and was devastated when the prince died in 1891.

Queen Marie Henriette did not support King Leopold's interest in the Congo, who compared it to the failed project of the Mexican Empire and saw the whole colonial project as an unrealistic adventure.

Queen Marie Henriette often visited Spa for extended periods of time, to relax from her representational duties as queen and the court life in Brussels, leaving her ceremonial duties to her daughter Clementine. Spa and the Ardennes reminded her of her childhood Hungary, and she enjoyed taking walks and riding her horses. In the year of 1895, this recurring situation became permanent. In 1895 she retreated to Spa; her youngest daughter Clementine replaced her as first lady at the Court in Brussels for the remainder of her husband's life. Marie Henriette bought the Hôtel du Midi in Spa and effectively separated from her husband. With her assistant Auguste Goffinet, she installed eighteen horses next to her villa, attended horse races and received foreign dignitaries. She continued to perform her duties as queen limited to the city of Spa, where she visited schools and performed charity and protected artists, and was referred to as the "Queen of Spa".

Marie Henriette died at the Hôtel du Midi in Spa. She was buried in the Royal Crypt at the Church of Our Lady of Laeken in Brussels. Her husband later married (though illegally under Belgian law) his mistress Caroline Delacroix.

== Issue ==
- Princess Louise of Belgium (1858–1924) married to Prince Philipp of Saxe-Coburg and Gotha
- Prince Léopold, Duke of Brabant (1859–1869); died young;
- Princess Stéphanie of Belgium (1864–1945) married to Prince Rudolf, Crown Prince of Austria, son of Franz Joseph I of Austria and Elisabeth of Bavaria;
- Princess Clémentine of Belgium (1872–1955) married to Victor, Prince Napoléon

== Titles, styles, honours and arms ==
=== Titles and styles ===
- 23 August 1836 – 22 August 1853: Her Imperial and Royal Highness Archduchess Marie Henriette of Austria
- 22 August 1853 – 17 December 1865: Her Imperial and Royal Highness The Duchess of Brabant
- 17 December 1865 – 19 September 1902: Her Majesty The Queen of the Belgians

=== Honours ===
She received the following awards:

- Austria-Hungary: Dame of the Order of the Starry Cross, 1st Class
- Kingdom of Bavaria: Dame of the Order of St. Michael
- Belgium: Grand Cordon of the Order of Leopold
- Mexican Empire: Dame Grand Cross of the Order of Saint Charles, 10 April 1865
- Persian Empire: Order of the Sun, 1st Class, 17 June 1873
- Kingdom of Portugal: Dame of the Order of Queen Saint Isabel, 5 August 1854
- Kingdom of Prussia: Dame of the Order of Louise, 1st Class
- Kingdom of Saxony: Dame of the Order of Sidonia, 1871
- Spain: Dame of the Order of Queen Maria Luisa, 6 April 1863
- Holy See: Golden Rose, 1893 – gift of Pope Leo XIII
- United Kingdom: Royal Order of Victoria and Albert, 1st Class, 1878

=== Arms ===
Alliance Coat of Arms of King Leopold II
and Queen Marie Henriette of Belgium

Royal Monogram of Queen Marie-Henriette
of Belgium

== Gallery ==
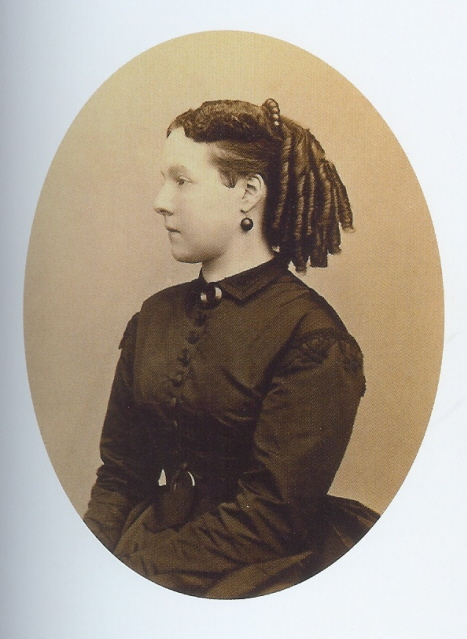
Archduchess Marie Henriette of Austria, 1850s

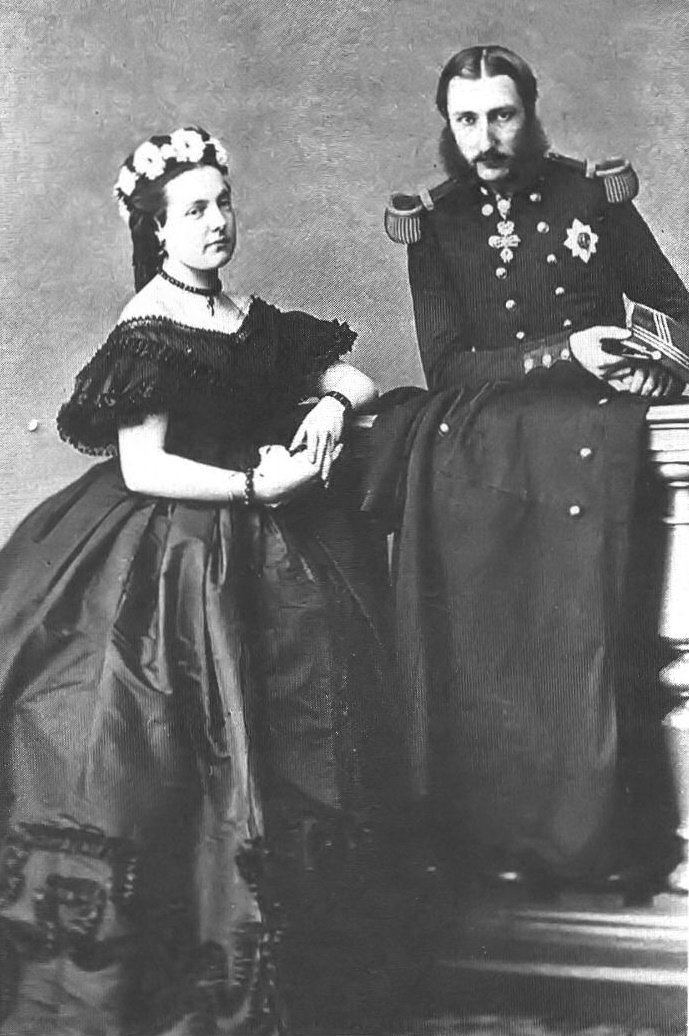
Marie Henriette and Leopold II of Belgium

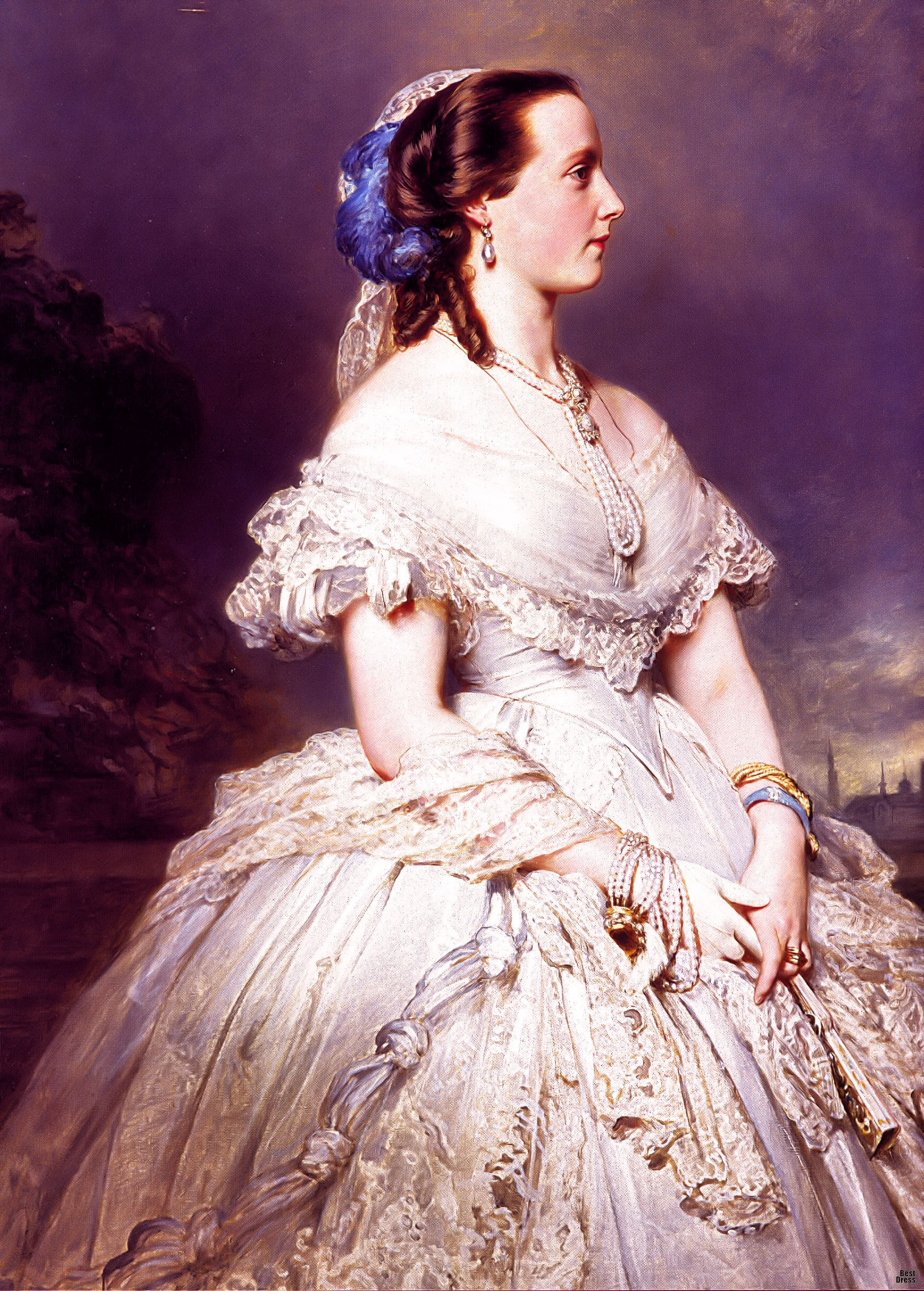
The Queen consort of the Belgians by Franz Xaver Winterhalter, circa 1865

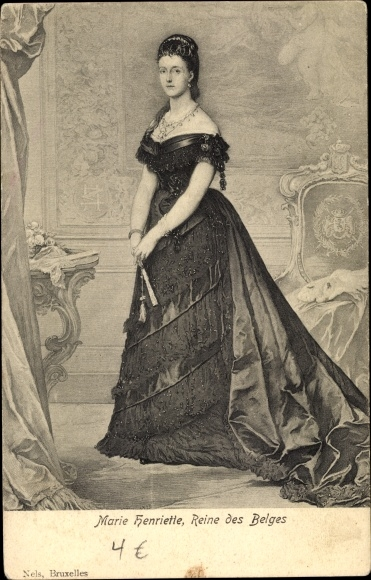
Marie Henriette of Belgium, late 1860s

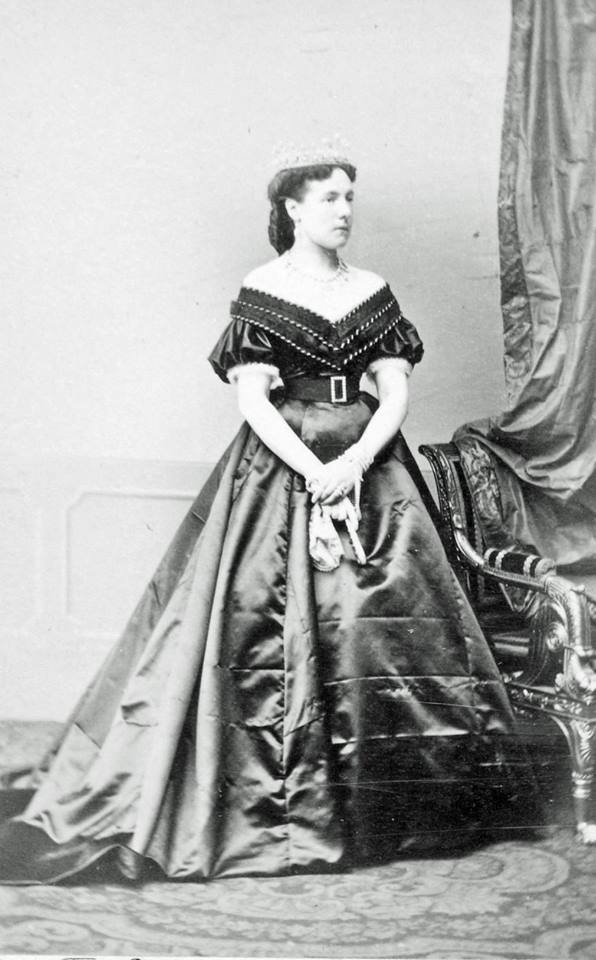
Marie Henriette of Austria, Queen of the Belgians, circa 1867

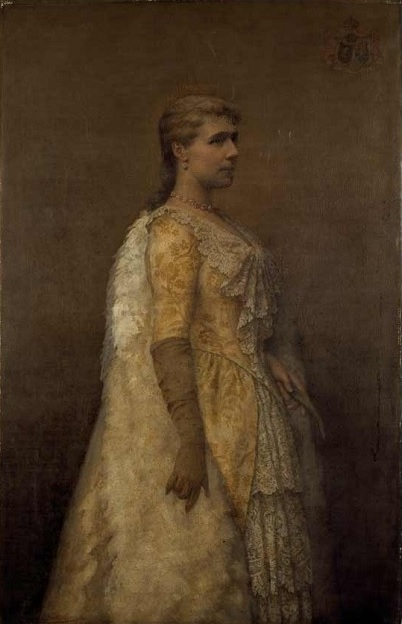
Portrait of Queen Marie Henriette (1870s)

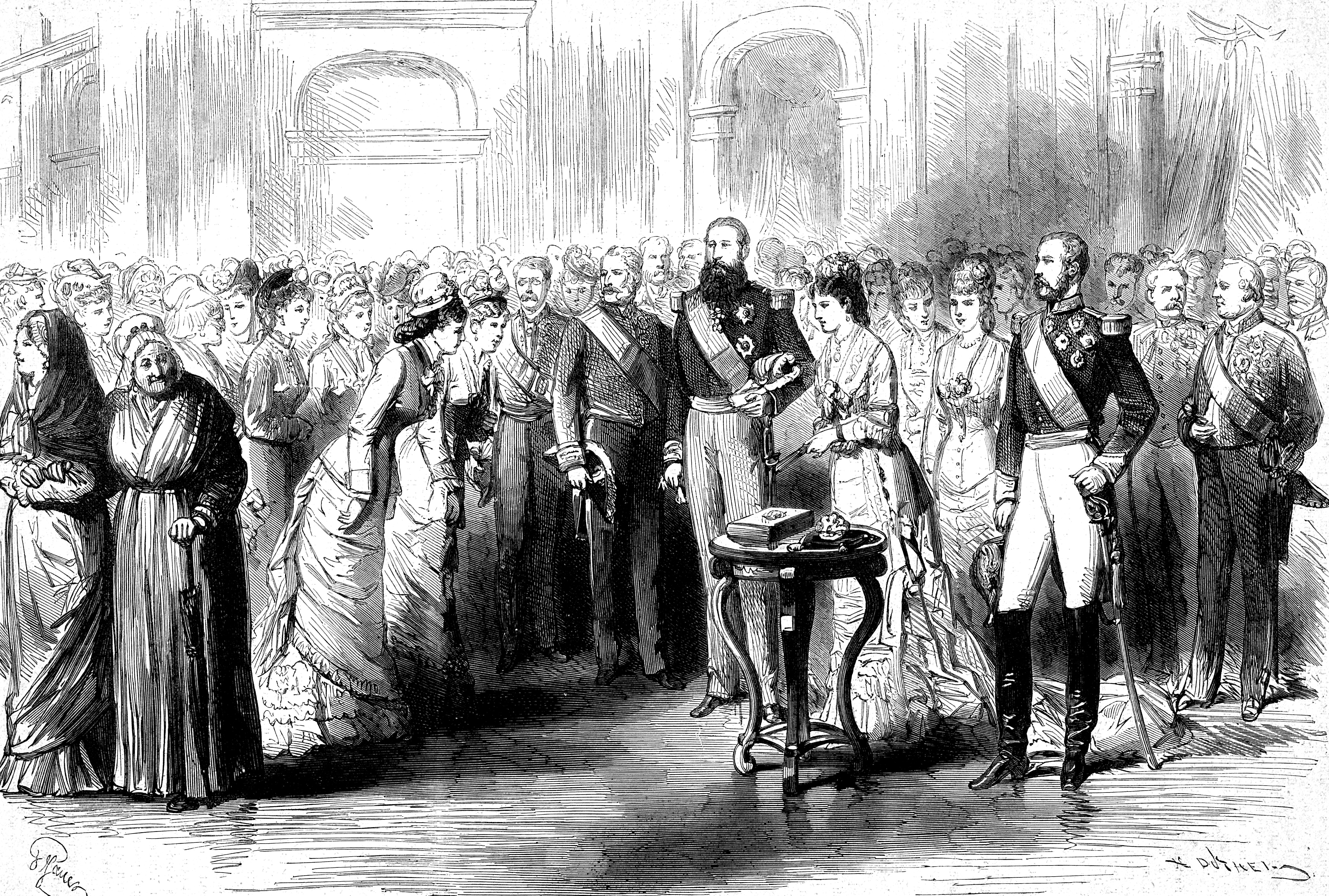
Twenty-fifth wedding anniversary of King Leopold II and Queen Marie-Henriette, Royal Palace (Brussels), 22 August 1878.

Marie Henriette of Austria House of Habsburg Born: 23 August 1836 Died: 19 September 1902
Belgian royalty
Vacant Title last held by Princess Louise of Orléans	Queen consort of the Belgians; 1865–1902	Vacant Title next held by Duchess Elisabeth of Bavaria
