= Prince Charles, Count of Flanders =

Regent of Belgium from 1944 to 1950

Prince Charles
- Count of Flanders
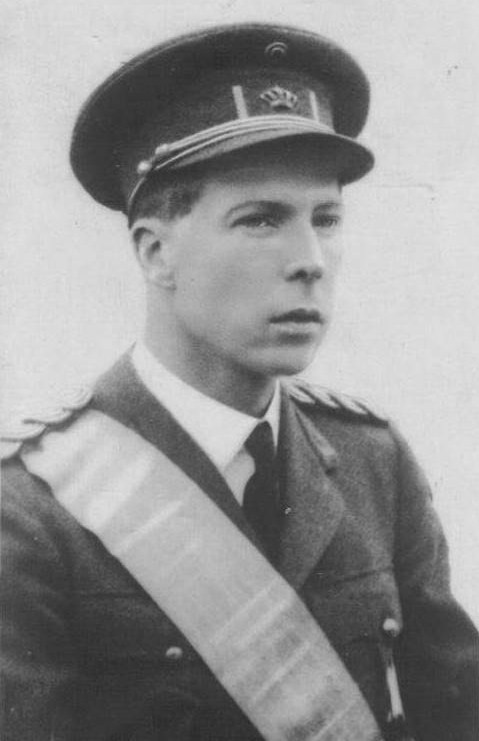
- The Count of Flanders c. 1944

Regent of Belgium
- Regency: 20 September 1944 – 20 July 1950
- Monarch: Leopold III
- Born: 10 October 1903; Brussels, Belgium
- Died: 1 June 1983 (aged 79); Raversijde, Belgium
- Burial: Church of Our Lady of Laeken
- Spouse: Jacqueline Peyrebrune (m. 1977)
- Issue: Isabelle Wybo
Names
- French: Charles Théodore Henri Antoine Meinrad; Dutch: Karel Theodoor Hendrik Anton Meinrad
- House: Saxe-Coburg and Gotha (until 1920); House of Belgium (from 1920)
- Father: Albert I of Belgium
- Mother: Elisabeth of Bavaria

Prince Charles, Count of Flanders (Dutch: Karel, German: Karl; 10 October 1903 – 1 June 1983) was a member of the Belgian royal family who served as regent of Belgium from 1944 until 1950, while a judicial commission investigated his elder brother, King Leopold III of Belgium, as to whether he betrayed the Allies of World War II by an allegedly premature surrender in 1940 and collaboration with the Nazis during the occupation of Belgium. Charles' regency ended when Leopold was allowed to return to Belgium. Shortly after returning and resuming his monarchical duties, Leopold abdicated in favour of his son, Baudouin.

During the Second World War, Charles was known as General du Boc, in order to hide his identity for security reasons. He had an association with RAF Hullavington in Wiltshire, where many top officers from Allied nations were based or transported to and from.

== Early life ==
Born in Brussels, Charles was the second son of King Albert I of Belgium and Duchess Elisabeth in Bavaria. During World War I, the children of the Belgian royal family were sent to the United Kingdom while King Albert I remained in Belgium behind the Yser Front. In 1915 Prince Charles began attending Wixenford School in Wokingham, Berkshire, and in 1917 proceeded to the Royal Naval College, Osborne, and two years later to Dartmouth. In 1926 he received the honorary rank of sub-lieutenant in the British Royal Navy, with promotion to honorary lieutenant the following year. Later in 1926 he returned to Belgium and began attending the Royal Military School of Brussels.

== Regency ==
Prince Charles was appointed Regent of Belgium when the German occupation of his country ended in 1944. The role of his elder brother King Leopold III during the Second World War, as well as Leopold's marriage to Mary Lilian Baels, was questioned and he became a controversial monarch.

Charles's regency was dominated by the events resulting from the German occupation and the controversies around his brother Leopold. This period had an important impact on events in later decades. During his regency, important economic and political decisions were taken.

Belgium managed to jump-start its national economy with the aid of American assistance provided under the Marshall Plan. The building sector was stimulated by government grants to repair war-damaged buildings and to build social housing. The financial sector was sanitized through the "Operation Gutt" (after its architect, Camille Gutt), whereby illegally gained profits during the war were targeted. A social welfare system was introduced and a system was set up to govern labour relations.

Furthermore, women obtained the right to vote in parliamentary elections in 1948.

Also during his regency the Benelux customs union was formed, Belgium became a member state of the United Nations, and the North Atlantic Treaty was signed.

In 1950, Charles's regency ended when Leopold III returned to Belgium and resumed his monarchical duties, following a plebiscite. Charles retired from public life, taking up residence in Ostend and becoming involved in artistic pursuits. Having taken up painting, he signed his works: "Karel van Vlaanderen" (Charles of Flanders).

He was the 377th knight Grand Cross of the Order of the Tower and Sword.

Charles had a natural daughter, Isabelle Wybo, born in 1938 as the result of a relationship with Jacqueline Wehrli, the daughter of a Brussels baker. Her existence was largely unknown until a biography of the prince was published in 2003. Wybo made an official appearance with her first cousin-once removed, Prince Laurent in 2012.

He died on 1 June 1983 in Ostend, predeceasing his elder brother by a few months, and was buried at the Church of Our Lady of Laeken in Brussels.

In his will he left the Empress Josephine's diamond tiara to his sister, Marie-José.

== Alleged marriage ==
It was reported that Prince Charles, Count of Flanders, married Louise Marie Jacqueline Peyrebrune (16 February 1921, in La Réole – 15 September 2014, in Saint-Hilaire-de-la-Noaille), formerly Mrs. Georges Schaack, daughter of Alfred Peyrebrune and Marie Madeleine Triaut, in a religious ceremony in Paris on 14 September 1977. This marriage has been mentioned in every edition of the revived Almanach de Gotha. However L'Allemagne Dynastique doubts this assertion, affirming instead that not only was there no civil marriage but that there was also no religious one (which could not take place before a civil marriage, according to French law). No such religious marriage is registered in the parish registers of Saint-Pierre-de-Montrouge, but a mere private blessing eight months after the death of her husband given by Father Marcelino Carrera was registered: "The private blessing uniting before God Charles Theodore Count of Flanders and Louise Marie Jacqueline Peyrebrune was given at Saint Peter's at the altar of the Sacred Heart on 14 September 1977. The mutual consent was received by your humble brother in Christ (Fr. Carrera) in the presence of Father Keller and witnesses (Comtesse Annie de Bergeret and Mme. Marie Jeannette Aurelie Menahes). The statement is also signed by the participants and witnesses." This was confirmed by private correspondence of Jacqueline Peyrebrune. She published her memoirs in two books: Love in Shadow - The Secret Garden of Prince Charles of Belgium (Editions Tarmeye, 1991) and Carnets Intimes (Editions Tarmeye, 1993).

== Honours ==
Country	Appointment	Ribbon	Post Nominal Titles
Belgium	Grand Cordon of the Order of Leopold		
Belgium	Grand Cross of the Order of the African Star		
Republic of China	Grand Cordon of the Order of the Cloud and Banner		
France	Grand Cross of the National Order of the Legion of Honour		
Greece	Grand Cross of the Order of the Redeemer		
Holy See	Knight Grand Cross in the Order of the Holy Sepulchre		
Italy	Knight of the Supreme Order of the Most Holy Annunciation		
Luxembourg	Knight of the Order of the Gold Lion of the House of Nassau		
Netherlands	Knight Grand Cross of the Order of the Netherlands Lion		
Norway	Grand Cross of the Order of Saint Olav		
Portugal	Grand Cross of the Military Order of the Tower and of the Sword		
Portugal	Grand Cross of the Military Order of Christ		
Romania	Grand Cross of the Order of Carol I		
Sovereign Military Order of Malta	Grand Cross of the Order pro merito melitensi		
Spain	Collar of the Order of Charles III		
Sweden	Knight of the Royal Order of the Seraphim		RSerafO
United Kingdom	Honorary Knight Grand Cross of the Royal Victorian Order		GCVO
United States	Chief Commander of the Legion of Merit		

== Ancestry ==
Ancestors of Prince Charles, Count of Flanders

8. Leopold I of Belgium
4. Prince Philippe, Count of Flanders
9. Princess Louise of Orléans
2. Albert I of Belgium
10. Karl Anton, Prince of Hohenzollern
5. Princess Marie of Hohenzollern-Sigmaringen
11. Princess Josephine of Baden
1. Prince Charles, Count of Flanders
12. Duke Maximilian Joseph in Bavaria
6. Duke Karl Theodor in Bavaria
13. Princess Ludovika of Bavaria
3. Duchess Elisabeth in Bavaria
14. Miguel I of Portugal
7. Infanta Maria José of Portugal
15. Princess Adelaide of Löwenstein

Prince Charles, Count of Flanders House of Saxe-Coburg-Gotha Cadet branch of the House of Wettin Born: 10 October 1903 Died: 1 June 1983
Belgian royalty
Vacant Title last held by Philippe of Belgium	Count of Flanders; 31 January 1910 – 1 June 1983	Vacant
