= Prince Leopold, Duke of Brabant =

Heir apparent of Leopold II of Belgium (1859–1869)

Prince Leopold
- Duke of Brabant, Count of Hainault
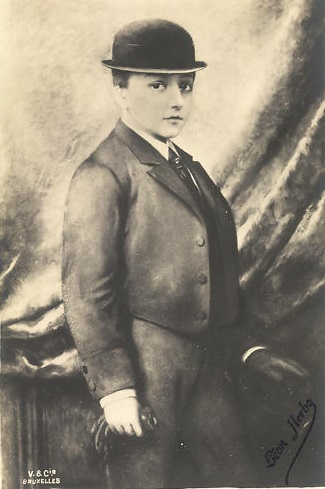
- Born: 12 June 1859; Royal Castle of Laeken, Laeken, Brussels, Belgium
- Died: 22 January 1869 (aged 9); Royal Castle of Laeken, Laeken, Brussels, Belgium
- Burial: Church of Our Lady of Laeken
Names
- French: Léopold Ferdinand Élie Victor Albert Marie; Dutch: Leopold Ferdinand Elias Viktor Albert Maria
- House: Saxe-Coburg and Gotha
- Father: Leopold II of Belgium
- Mother: Marie Henriette of Austria

Prince Leopold of Belgium, Duke of Brabant, Count of Hainaut (12 June 1859 – 22 January 1869), was the second child and only son of King Leopold II of Belgium and his wife, Marie Henriette of Austria, and heir apparent to the Belgian throne.

== Life ==
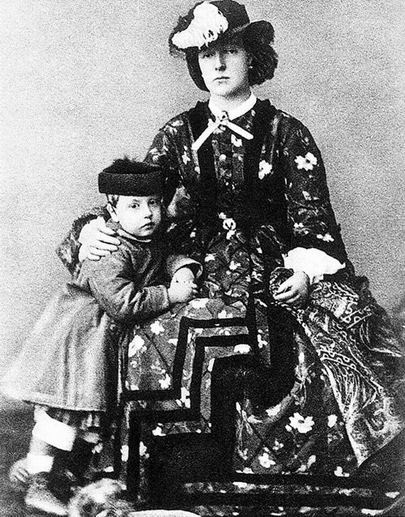
Prince Leopold with his mother, Marie Henriette in 1864

At birth, Leopold was styled Count of Hainaut, as the eldest son of the then-crown prince. At the time of his birth, his grandfather Leopold, formerly a Prince of Saxe-Coburg and Gotha, was the reigning king of Belgium.

Leopold was preceded in birth by one sister, Princess Louise, and followed by two more sisters, Princess Stéphanie, and Princess Clémentine, who was born after Leopold's death, their parents' last hope for another son.

Leopold became Duke of Brabant in 1865, upon the death of his grandfather and the ascension of his father to the throne.

== Death ==
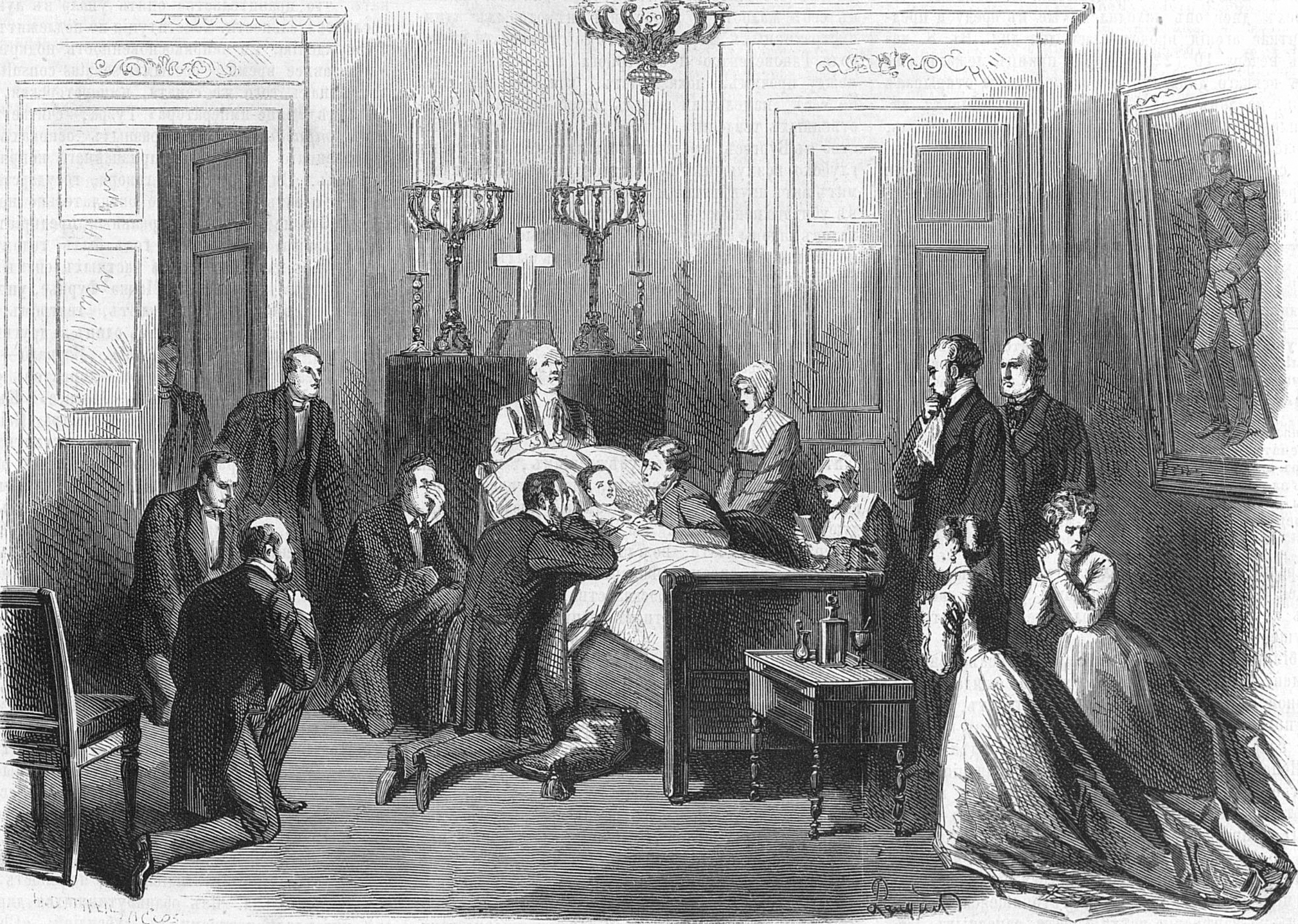
The death of Prince Leopold

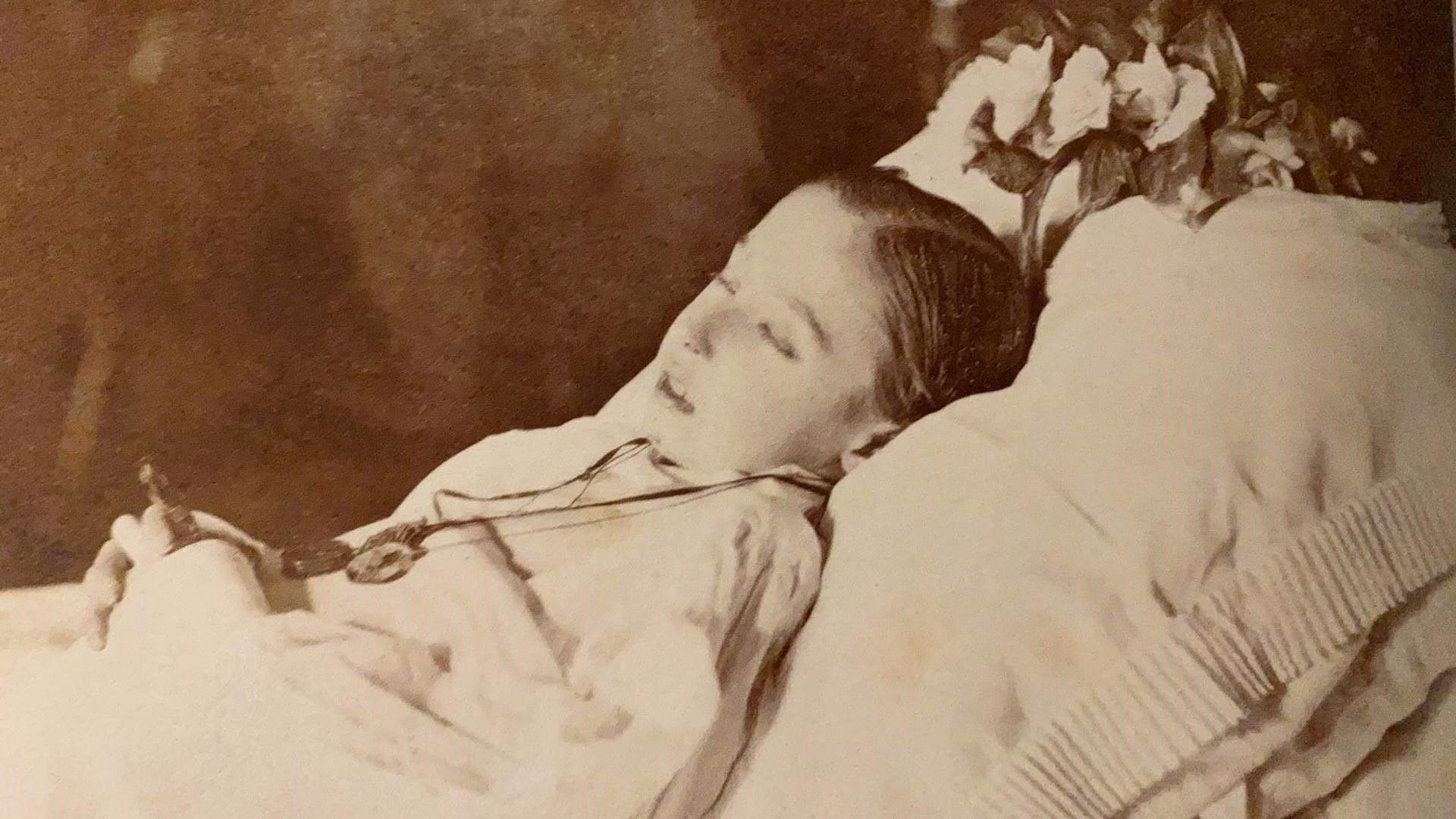
Prince Leopold on his deathbed

Leopold died at Laeken or Brussels on 22 January 1869 from pneumonia, after falling into a pond.

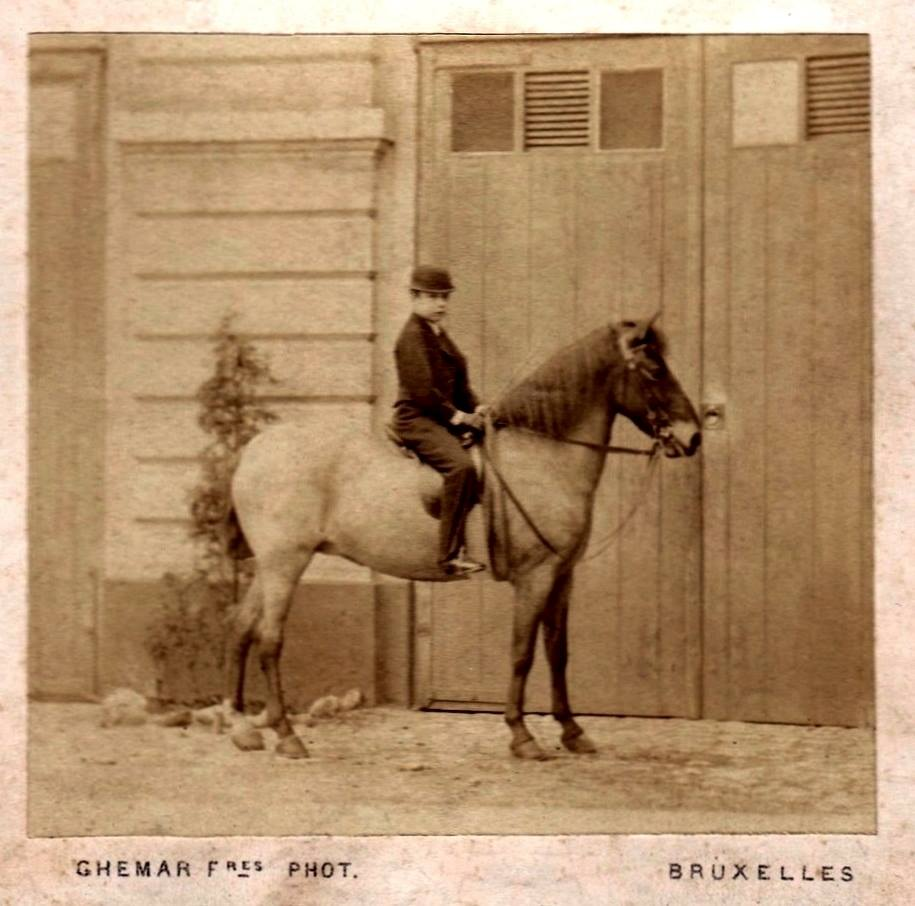
Prince Leopold with his pony Kiss me quick. Photo by Louis-Joseph Ghemar, 1868

At his son's funeral, King Leopold II "broke down in public, collapsing to his knees beside the coffin and sobbing uncontrollably." Prince Leopold's body was interred at the royal vault at the Church of Our Lady of Laeken in Brussels.

Leopold's premature death left his father with only two children remaining: Princess Louise and Princess Stéphanie. After their son's death, Leopold and Marie Henriette tried to have another child, hoping for a son. After the birth of yet another daughter, Clémentine, in 1872, the couple abandoned all hopes of ever having another son as male heir and their already strained marriage broke down completely. However, King Leopold II had two illegitimate sons, Lucien and Philippe, with Caroline Lacroix, whom the King briefly married five days before his death in 1909, but didn't succeed in bringing them to the Belgian throne.

Upon his death in 1909, Leopold II was succeeded by his nephew, Albert I, whose eldest son would later succeed him as Leopold III. As before 1991, Belgium applied the Salic law, which prohibited females from succeeding the Belgian throne.

== Honours ==
- Spain: Knight of the Order of the Golden Fleece, 11 February 1866

== Ancestry ==
Ancestors of Prince Leopold, Duke of Brabant

8. Francis, Duke of Saxe-Coburg-Saalfeld
4. Leopold I of Belgium
9. Countess Augusta Reuss of Ebersdorf
2. Leopold II of Belgium
10. Louis Philippe I of France
5. Princess Louise of Orléans
11. Princess Maria Amalia of Naples and Sicily
1. Prince Leopold, Duke of Brabant
12. Leopold II, Holy Roman Emperor
6. Archduke Joseph, Palatine of Hungary
13. Infanta Maria Louisa of Spain
3. Archduchess Marie Henriette of Austria
14. Duke Louis of Württemberg
7. Duchess Maria Dorothea of Württemberg
15. Princess Henriette of Nassau-Weilburg

Prince Leopold, Duke of Brabant House of Saxe-Coburg-Gotha Born: 12 June 1859 Died: 22 January 1869
Belgian royalty
New title	Count of Hainaut; 1859–1865	Vacant Title next held by Baudouin
Preceded by Leopold (II)	Duke of Brabant; 1865–1869	Vacant Title next held by Leopold (III)
