= Our Lady of Aberdeen =

Belgian religious statue

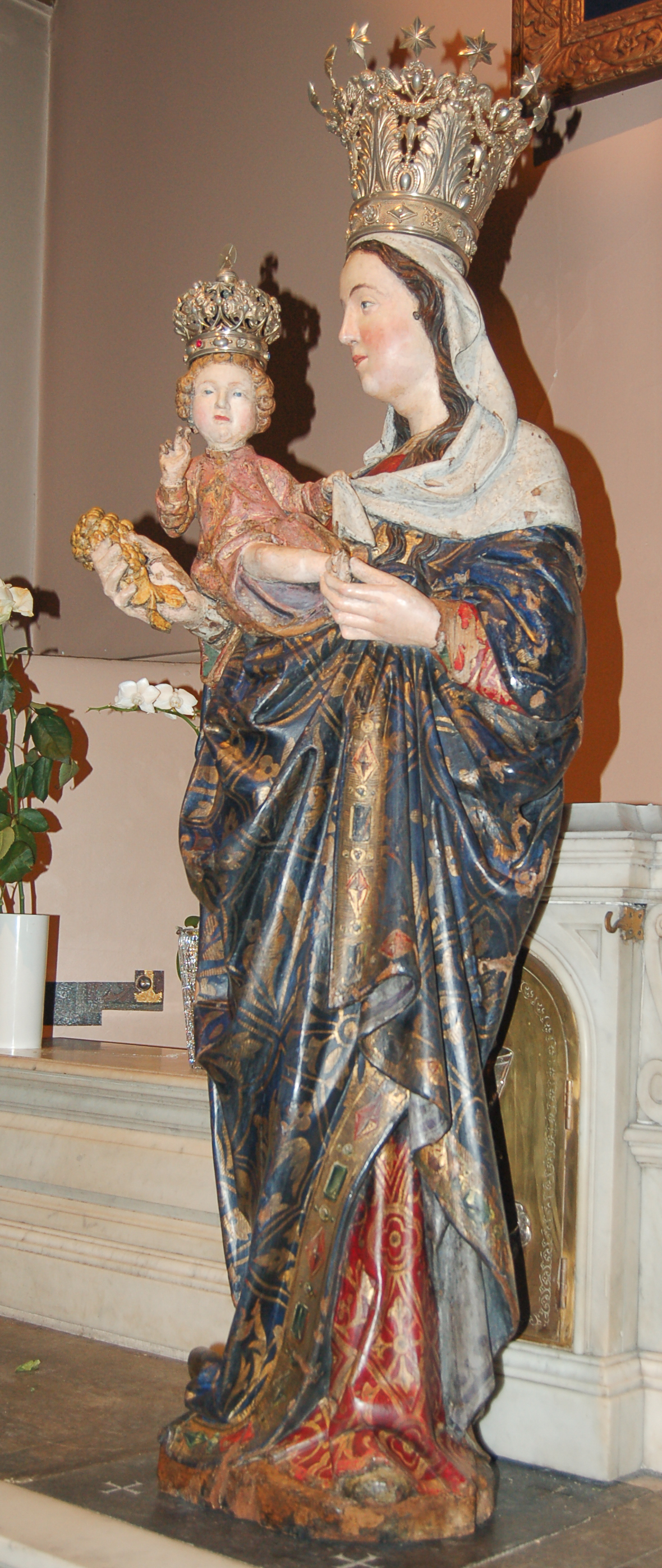
Original statue, Church of Our Lady of Finisterrae, Brussels

Our Lady of Aberdeen the traditional term for the Notre Dame du Bon Succès, a wooden statue of the Madonna and Child which is now venerated in the Church of Our Lady of Finisterrae in Brussels, Belgium. Originally venerated in Old Aberdeen, the original statue was hidden at Strathbogie Castle for decades following the 1560 Scottish Reformation by the Catholic Marquess of Huntly and Chief of Clan Gordon, to protect it from destruction by the Kirk. It was eventually smuggled for its own protection in 1625 to its current location in what was then the Spanish Netherlands.

Since Catholic Emancipation in 1829, replicas of the statue have become widely popular objects of devotion throughout the whole North East of Scotland. The once strictly illegal and underground Catholic Church in Scotland celebrates the feast day of Our Lady of Aberdeen every 9 July.

== History ==
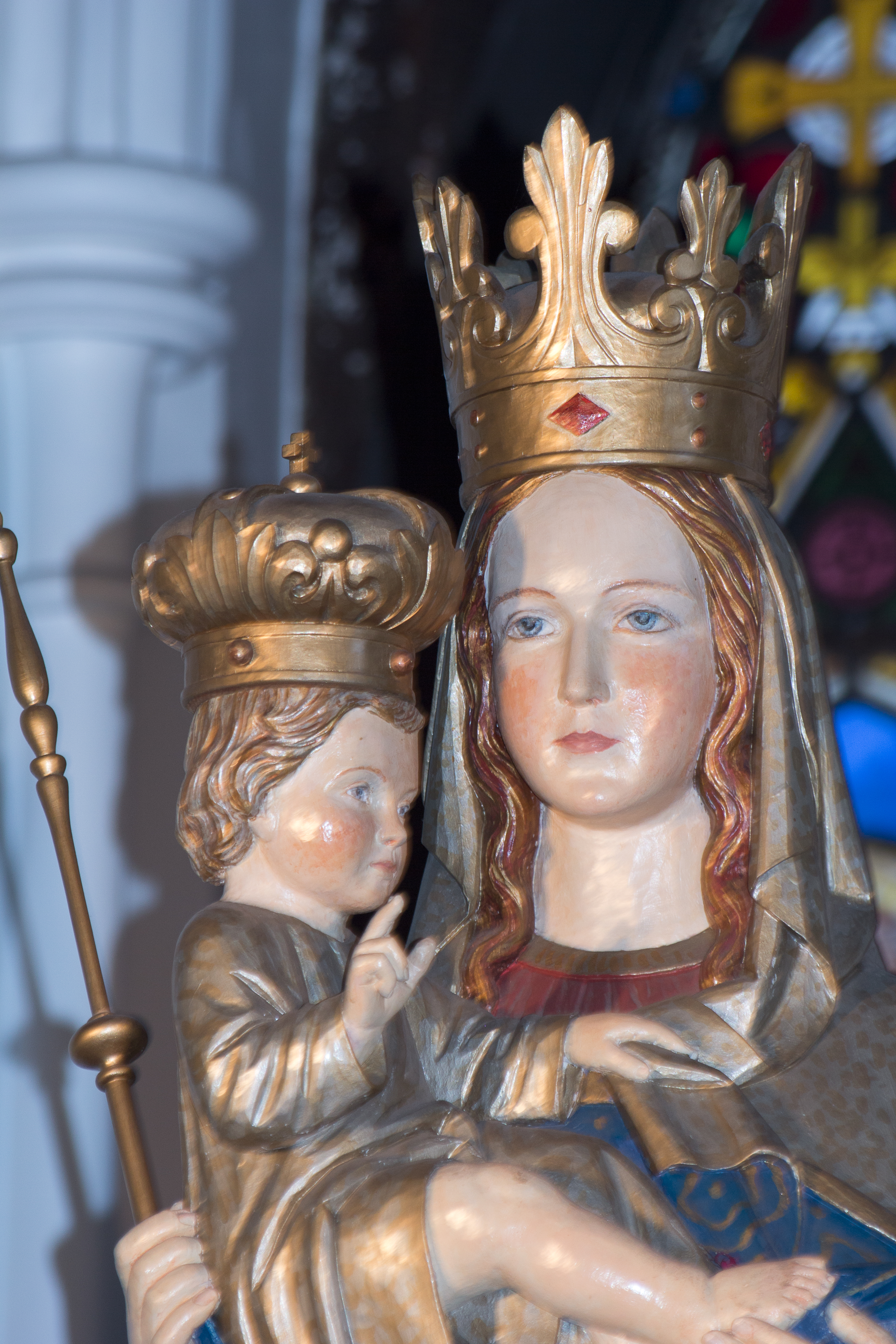
The Our Lady of Aberdeen replica statue inside Our Lady of the Assumption Cathedral, Aberdeen

The origins of the statue in Brussels are uncertain. It is believed that it may have been in Old Aberdeen as early as 1450. References to a statue in a Chapel at the Bridge of Dee in Aberdeen suggest that it may have been placed there by Bishop Gavin Dunbar of Aberdeen (1514–1531).

At the beginning of the Scottish Reformation (c. 1559), many Christian art and consecrated religious objects from churches and, from St Machar's Cathedral in Old Aberdeen in particular, were either destroyed by the officials of the Kirk or given for safe keeping to Catholic sympathisers. It is claimed that the statue was kept in safekeeping by a Catholic member of the local Scottish nobility, George Gordon, 1st Marquess of Huntly and Chief of Clan Gordon, at Strathbogie Castle until 1625. It was then smuggled to Dunkirk in the Spanish Netherlands by William Laing, thought to be an agent for the Spanish Habsburgs, and given to Albert VII, Archduke of Austria and his wife, Infanta Isabella Clara Eugenia, in Brussels. There is a reliable and well documented history of Notre Dame du Bon Succès in Brussels from that date until the present.

Writing in 1909, Dom Odo Blundell of Fort Augustus Abbey, the respected historian of the illegal and underground Catholic Church in Scotland, declared, "The Abbé MacPherson, than whom no one was more conversant with the history of the Catholic Church in Scotland since the Reformation, asserted that, 'the preservation of the ancient Faith was due, under God, to the House of Gordon'. And indeed this fact stands out very prominently in the history of the seventeenth and of the first half of the eighteenth centuries, and receive confirmation from the fact that whether we follow the titles of the former Dukes of Gordon, or the line of their possessions, we shall always find that the Catholics were there protected, and that fair remains of the old Faith still exist."

== Locations ==
There are copies in St. Mary's Cathedral and in the Bishop's House, formerly the Convent of the Sacred Heart at Queen's Cross, both in Aberdeen. Other copies include one at St Peter's Church in Buckie and another at St Peter's Church in Aberdeen.

== Feast day ==
The Catholic Church in Scotland celebrates 9 July as Our Lady of Aberdeen Day.

== See also ==
For historic details of Notre Dame du Bon Succès and Our Lady of Aberdeen see the papers by Ray McAleese – below. The monograph by Ron Smith (see below) gives a devotional account of beliefs about Our Lady of Aberdeen and Notre Dame du Bon Succès.
