= Notre Dame du Bon Succès =

Statue in Brussels, Belgium

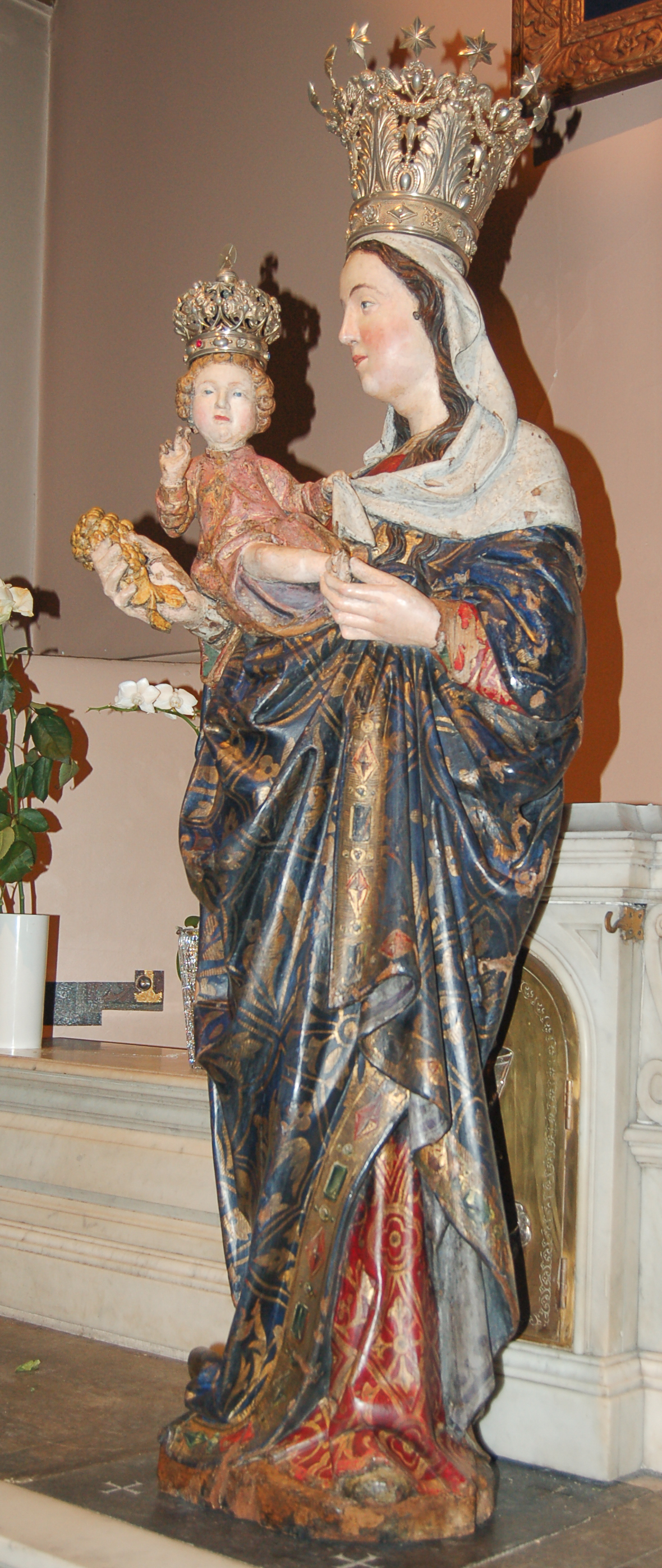
- Location within Brussels
- Year: Pre-1625
- Type: Wood
- Location: City of Brussels, Brussels-Capital Region, Belgium
- Coordinates: 50.8529°N 4.3557°E

Notre Dame du Bon Succès is a wooden statue of the Madonna and Child in the Church of Our Lady of Finisterrae in central Brussels, Belgium. Its history before 1625 is based on uncertain records, but after that date, its story is well documented. Originally from St Machar's Cathedral in Aberdeen, Scotland, it is believed to have been sent to Dunkirk by William Laing, the Procurer for the King of Spain. The statue came to Brussels in 1625, where it was venerated in the Temple of the Augustinians. It was transferred to Finisterrae in 1814, when the Augustinian Temple became a Protestant place of worship.

Many myths and miracles have been associated with Notre Dame du Bon Succès. The statue is made from oak and walnut. There is evidence of repairs from X-ray computed tomography (CT) scanning. Copies of this statue are known as Our Lady of Aberdeen in Scotland.

== History ==
The origins of the statue are uncertain. It is believed that it may have been in Old Aberdeen as early as 1450. References to a statue in a Chapel at the Bridge of Dee in Aberdeen suggest that it may have been placed there by Bishop Gavin Dunbar of Aberdeen (1514–1531).

At the beginning of the Scottish Reformation (c. 1559), many Christian art and consecrated religious objects from churches and, from St Machar's Cathedral in Old Aberdeen in particular, were either destroyed by the officials of the Kirk or given for safe keeping to Catholic sympathisers. It is claimed that the statue was kept in safekeeping by a Catholic member of the local Scottish nobility, George Gordon, 1st Marquess of Huntly and Chief of Clan Gordon, at Strathbogie Castle until 1625. It was then smuggled to Dunkirk in the Spanish Netherlands by William Laing, thought to be an agent for the Spanish Habsburgs, and given to Albert VII, Archduke of Austria and his wife, Infanta Isabella Clara Eugenia, in Brussels. There is a reliable and well documented history of Notre Dame du Bon Succès in Brussels from that date until the present.

== Our Lady of Aberdeen ==
Since Catholic Emancipation in 1829, replicas of the statue have become widely popular objects of devotion throughout the whole North East of Scotland. There are copies in St. Mary's Cathedral and in the Bishop's House, formerly the Convent of the Sacred Heart at Queen's Cross, both in Aberdeen. Other copies include one at St Peter's Church in Buckie and another at St Peter's Church in Aberdeen.

== See also ==
- Sculpture in Brussels
- History of Brussels
- Culture of Belgium
