= Nieuwstraat =

Nieuwstraat may refer to:

- Nieuwstraat (Brussels), a street in Brussels
- Nieuwstraat (Kerkrade), a street shared between Kerkrade, Netherlands and Herzogenrath, Germany
