= Church of Our Lady of Finisterrae =

Church in Brussels, Belgium

- Église Notre-Dame du Finistère (French); Onze-Lieve-Vrouw van Finisterraekerk (Dutch)
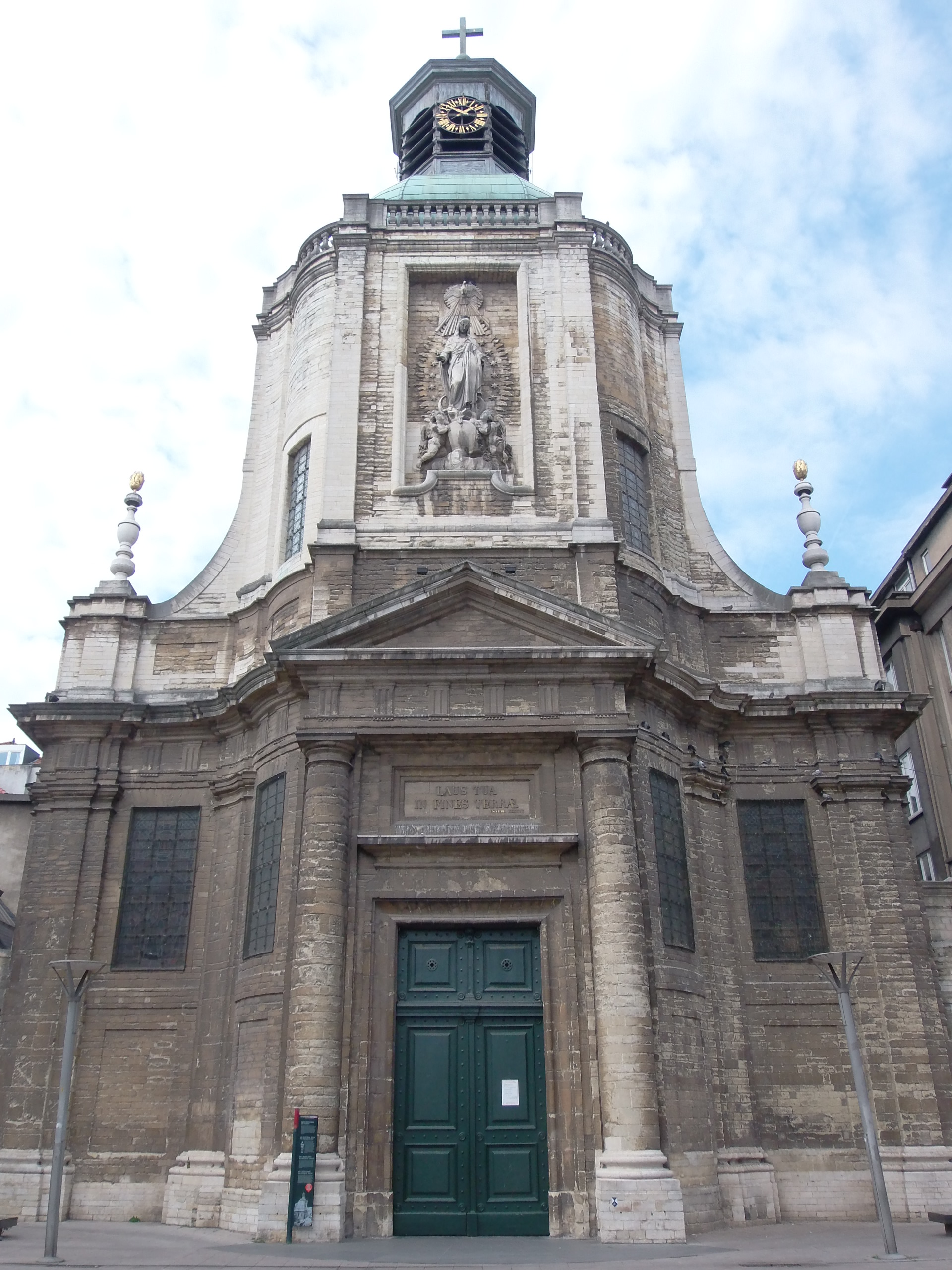
- Church of Our Lady of Finisterrae
- 50°51′11″N 4°21′20″E
- Location: Rue Neuve / Nieuwstraat; 1000 City of Brussels, Brussels-Capital Region
- Country: Belgium
- Denomination: Catholic Church

History
- Dedication: Our Lady of Finisterrae

Architecture
- Functional status: Active
- Heritage designation: Protected
- Designated: 24/12/1958
- Architectural type: Church
- Style: Brabantine Baroque; Neoclassical

Administration
- Archdiocese: Mechelen–Brussels

Clergy
- Archbishop: Luc Terlinden (Primate of Belgium)

The Church of Our Lady of Finisterrae (French: Église Notre-Dame du Finistère; Dutch: Onze-Lieve-Vrouw van Finisterraekerk) is a Catholic church in central Brussels, Belgium. It is dedicated to Our Lady of Finisterrae.

The current church, which combines Brabantine Baroque and neoclassical styles, was built at the beginning of the 18th century, replacing an older chapel dating back to the early 17th century, when the Rue Neuve/Nieuwstraat was created, to house a miraculous statuette of the Virgin. The complex was designated a historic monument in 1958.

== History ==
=== Origins ===
As early as the 15th century, a small chapel dedicated to Our Lady stood near Brussels' vegetable gardens, at the edge of the urban area (with some exaggeration Finis Terrae or "End of the World"), hence the name it acquired of Our Lady of Finisterrae. Another tradition has it that the name comes from a small statue of Our Lady brought back from Cape Finisterre in Galicia, Spain, which became the object of popular devotion.

The original chapel was destroyed in an invasion by the Netherlands during the Eighty Years' War, but it was subsequently rebuilt on a larger scale thanks to the many donations and endowments from pilgrims. In 1617, the archbishop of Mechelen Matthias Hovius solemnly consecrated the new sanctuary, and in 1620, the statue of Our Lady of Finisterrae was returned to its rightful place.

In the 17th century, the district had become highly urbanised and was incorporated into the City of Brussels. To accommodate this growing population, the chapel was promoted to a parish church in 1646, served by the Oratorians of Saint Philip Neri, which already had to be enlarged by 1654.

=== Current church ===
The church that we see today is the third. The architects are probably Guilliam or Willem de Bruyn, who also who took part in the reconstruction of the Grand-Place/Grote Markt (Brussels' main square), and the sculptor Hendrik Frans Verbruggen. Construction began in 1708 with the choir, continued in 1713 with the naves and stopped around 1730, when the interior and the lower part of the façade were completed.

Closed during the French Revolution, the church was returned to worship and restored in 1804. In 1828, the upper part of the façade was built and crowned with an octagonal lantern. A statue of the Virgin Mary surrounded by the twelve stars of the Apocalypse was added in 1857. In 1848, the interior of the porch and the rood screen for the organ were fitted out, and in 1852, a chapel was built onto the northern aisle to house the statuette of Notre Dame du Bon Succès (see below). The symmetrical baptistery of the chapel on the south side, and the low walls that conceal them both on the façade probably date from the same period.

The church was designated a historic monument on 24 December 1958. In 1970, a fire engulfed the bell tower, which was subsequently restored. This incident took place only three years after another major fire destroyed the À L'Innovation department store on the other side of the Rue Neuve/Nieuwstraat. Restoration work was carried out in 1988, based on 1983 plans by the architects M. and P. Mignot.

== Description ==
The church has a neoclassical appearance, even if the influence of Brabantine Baroque, which rejected overly severe straight lines, is perceptible. The building adopts the basilica plan: three-aisled with a central nave, two side aisles, and a semi-circular choir, without a transept. The five-bay main nave is closed by a semi-circular apse, while the side aisles end with chapels.

== Exterior ==
The somewhat heterogeneous façade comprises two distinct sections: the lower part, which is neoclassical, and the upper part, which is more Baroque. The rectangular portal, surrounded by Doric columns, is surmounted by an entablature supporting a triangular tympanum and a slightly recessed panel bearing the inscription "LAUS TUA / IN FINES TERRAE" ("Praised unto the end of the world", Psalm 47). The upper section of the pediment is flanked by decorative fins with flares.

The bell tower, whose central part is aligned with the portal, features a niche decorated in 1857 with a relief of a Madonna by the sculptor van Aerendonck (replacing an older statue of Our Lady from 1843), as well as curved side bays with rectangular windows. Mary is standing on a crescent moon, with one foot treading on the head of a serpent, corresponding to the depiction of the Woman of the Apocalypse from the Book of Revelation on the one hand, and reflecting the Immaculate Conception on the other. The Holy Ghost hovers above her head in the form of a dove.

The aisles adjoin the sides of the façade and a stone balustrade runs around the tower, which is capped by a copper dome and octagonal lantern with louvres and clock, bearing the cross (1828).

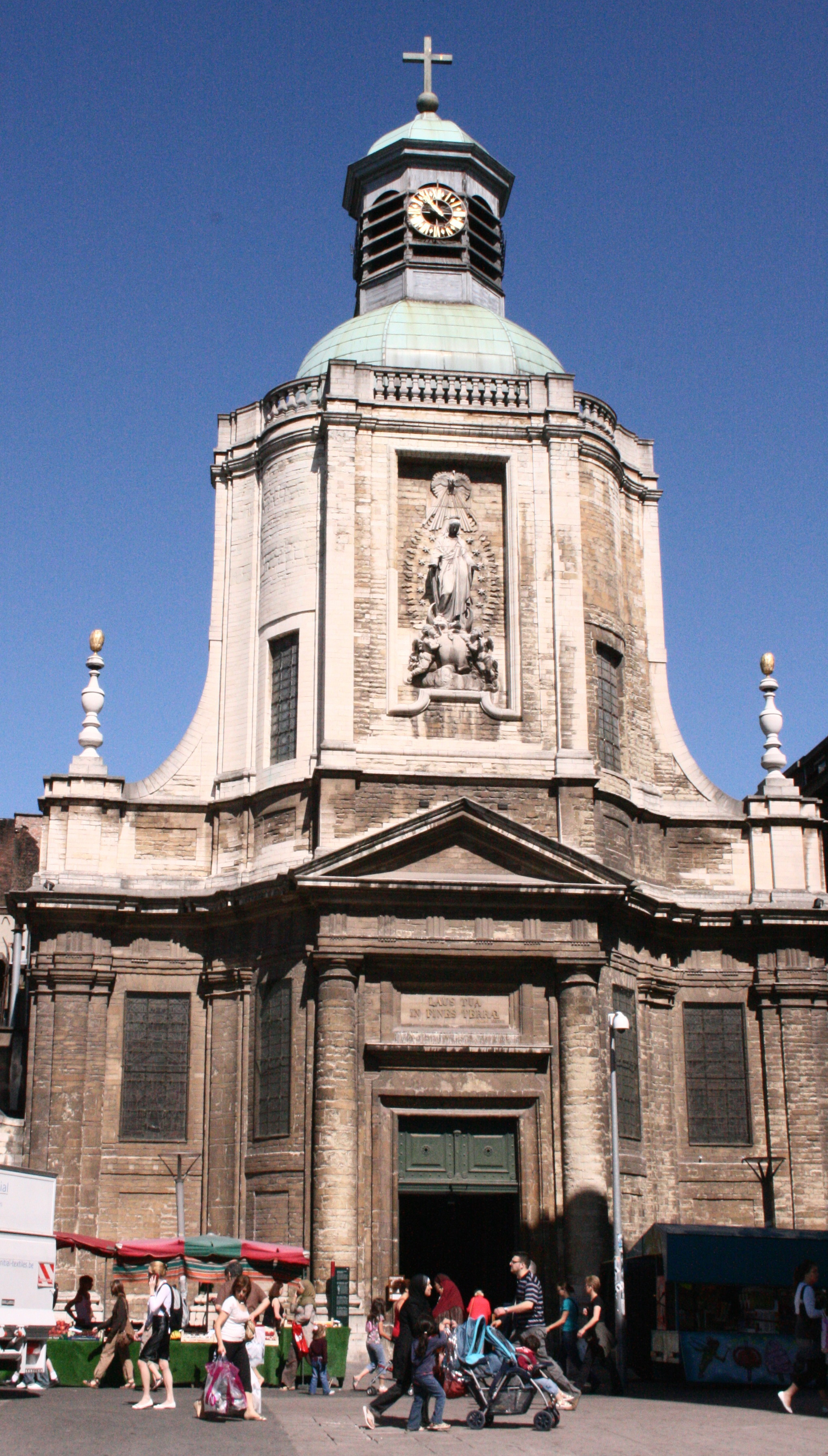
Main façade

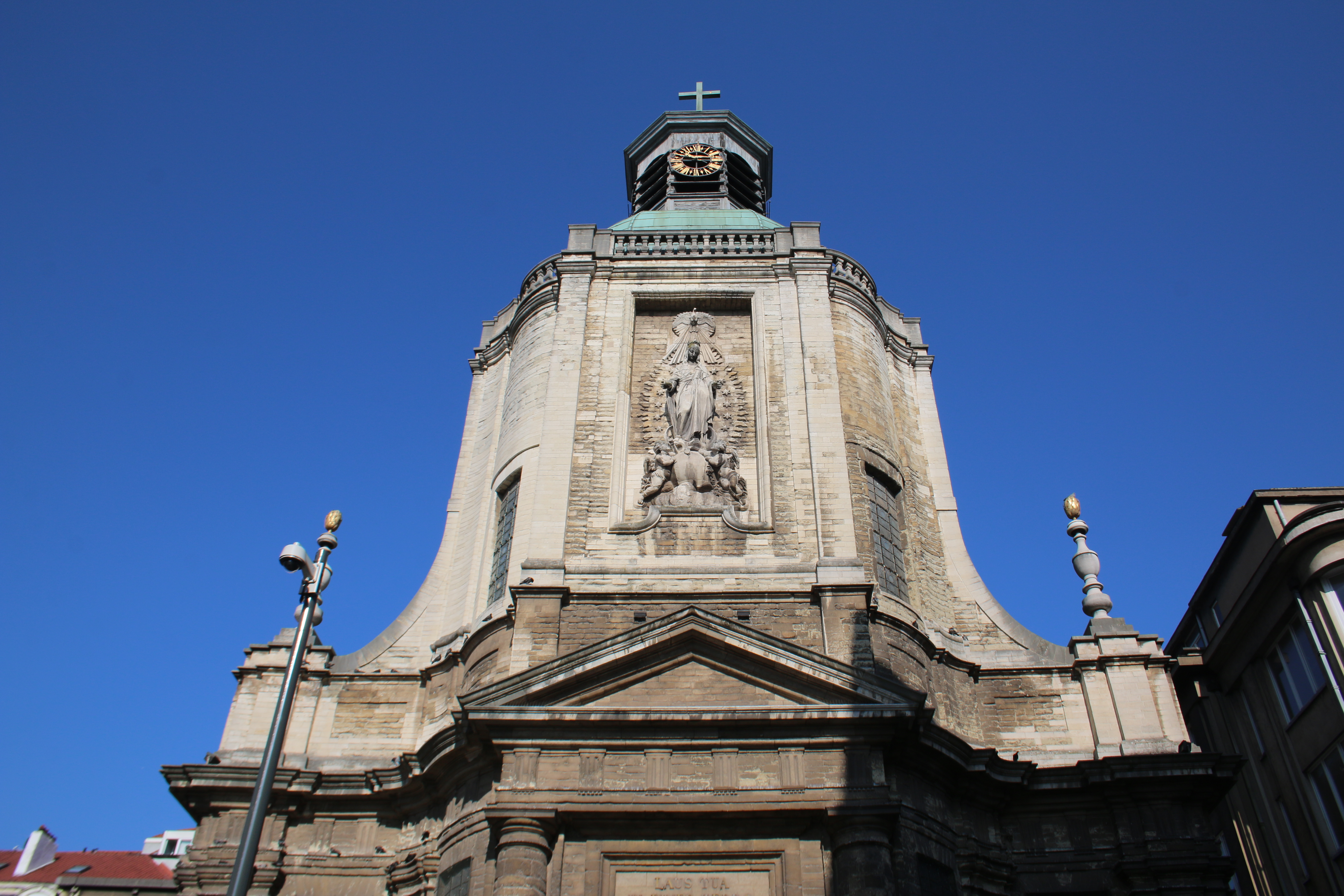
Upper part of the façade

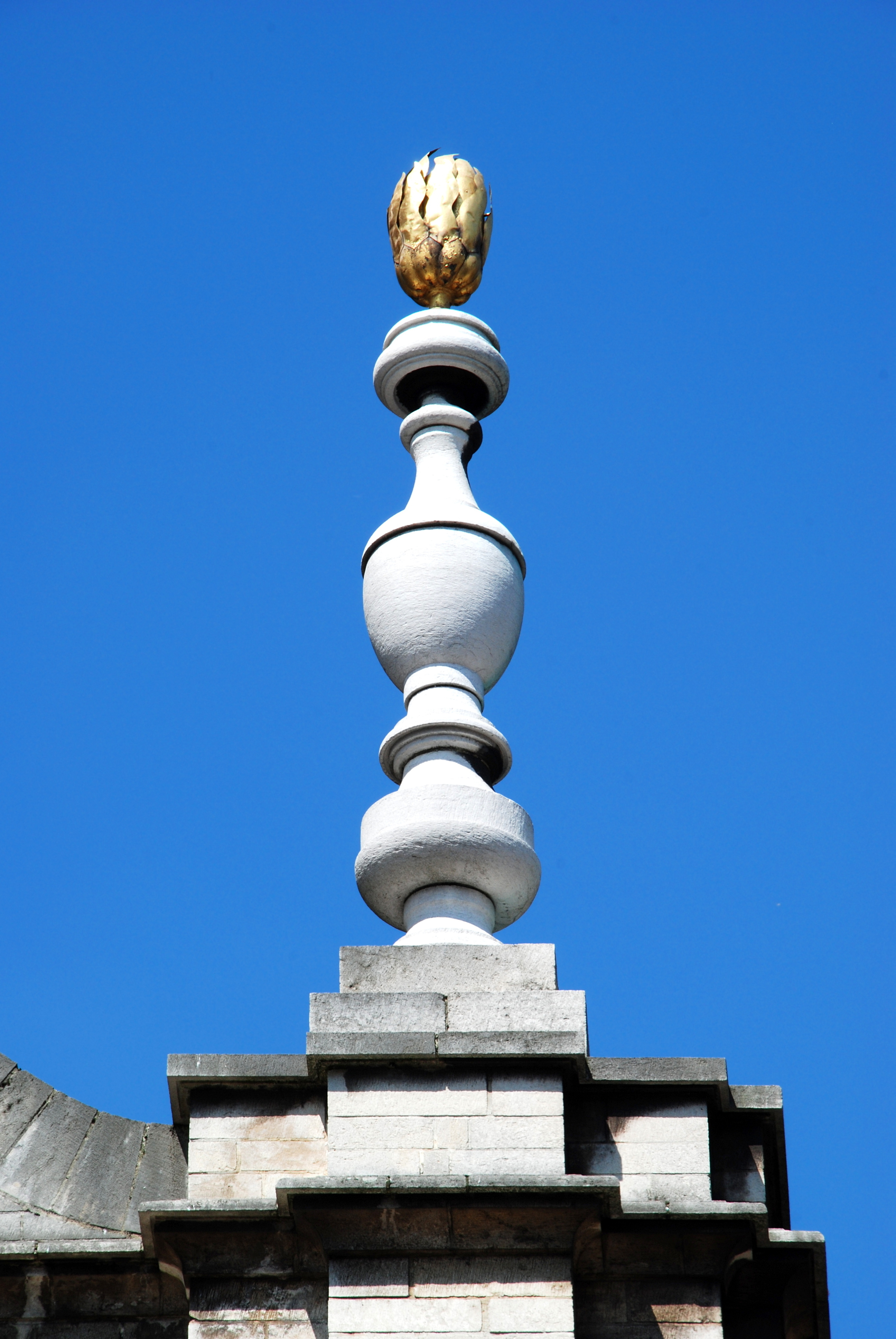
Decorative fin with flare

== Interior ==
The interior, with its Late Baroque decorations of stucco and faux marble with composite motifs of garlands, foliage, shells, etc., contrasts with the layout of the façade. They are the work of the Swiss sculptor François Antoine Peri. The church also contains paintings by Gaspar de Crayer, Joseph van Severdonck and Charles de Groux.

The naturalistic pulpit is by I. Duray Senior (1758). It depicts the Fall of Man, between the Tree of Life and the Tree of Death. Moses with the Tablets of the Law and his brother Aaron represent the Old Covenant, while the crucified Christ is suggestive of salvation. The pulpit cover, forming a large canopy, is suspended between two pillars and supported by sculpted angels. Beneath it is a dove symbolising the Holy Ghost.

The organ from 1848–1856, located at the front of the church above the main entrance, is by Hippolyte Loret, and was last restored in 1999 by the firm of Thomas and Jean Ferrard.

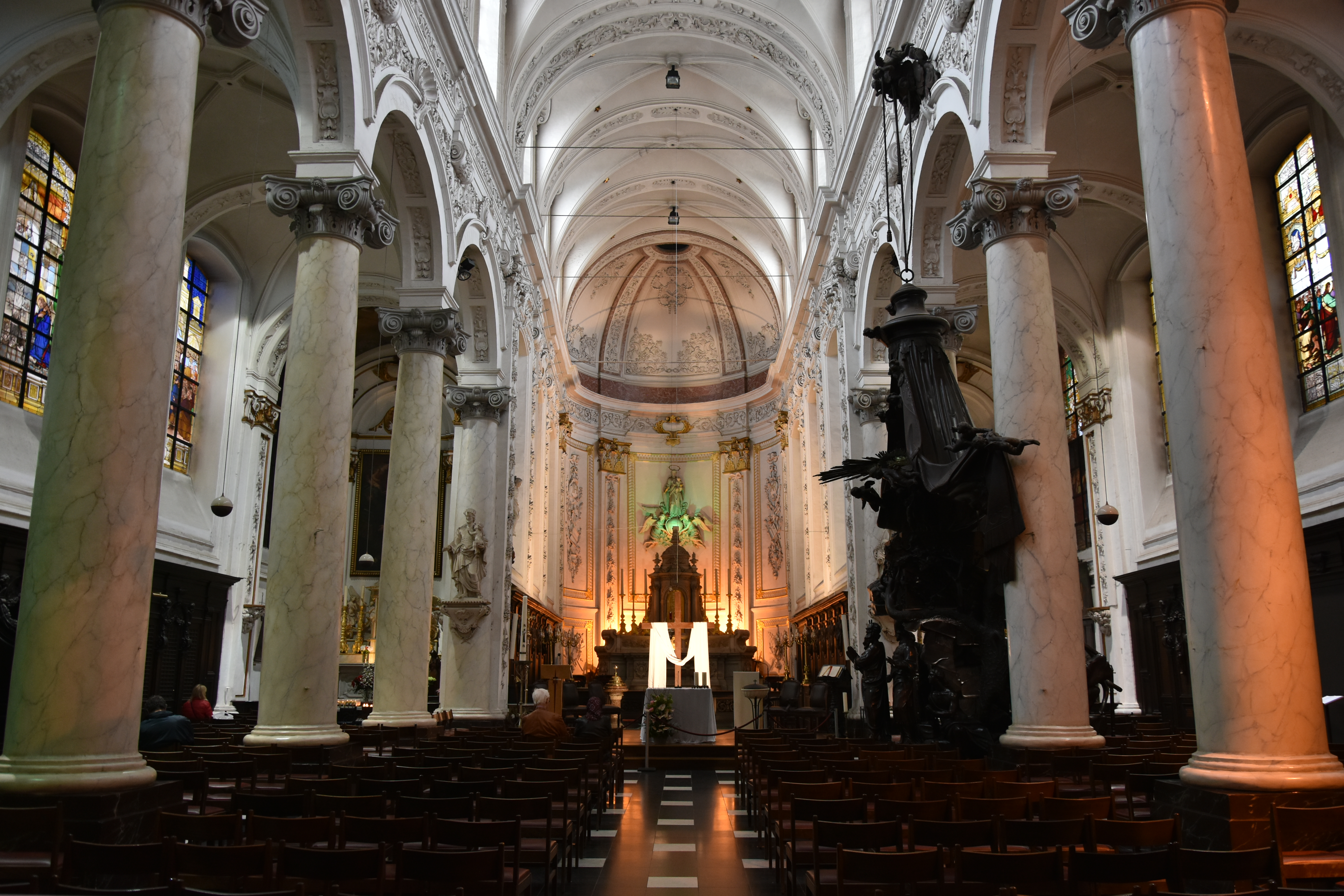
The nave

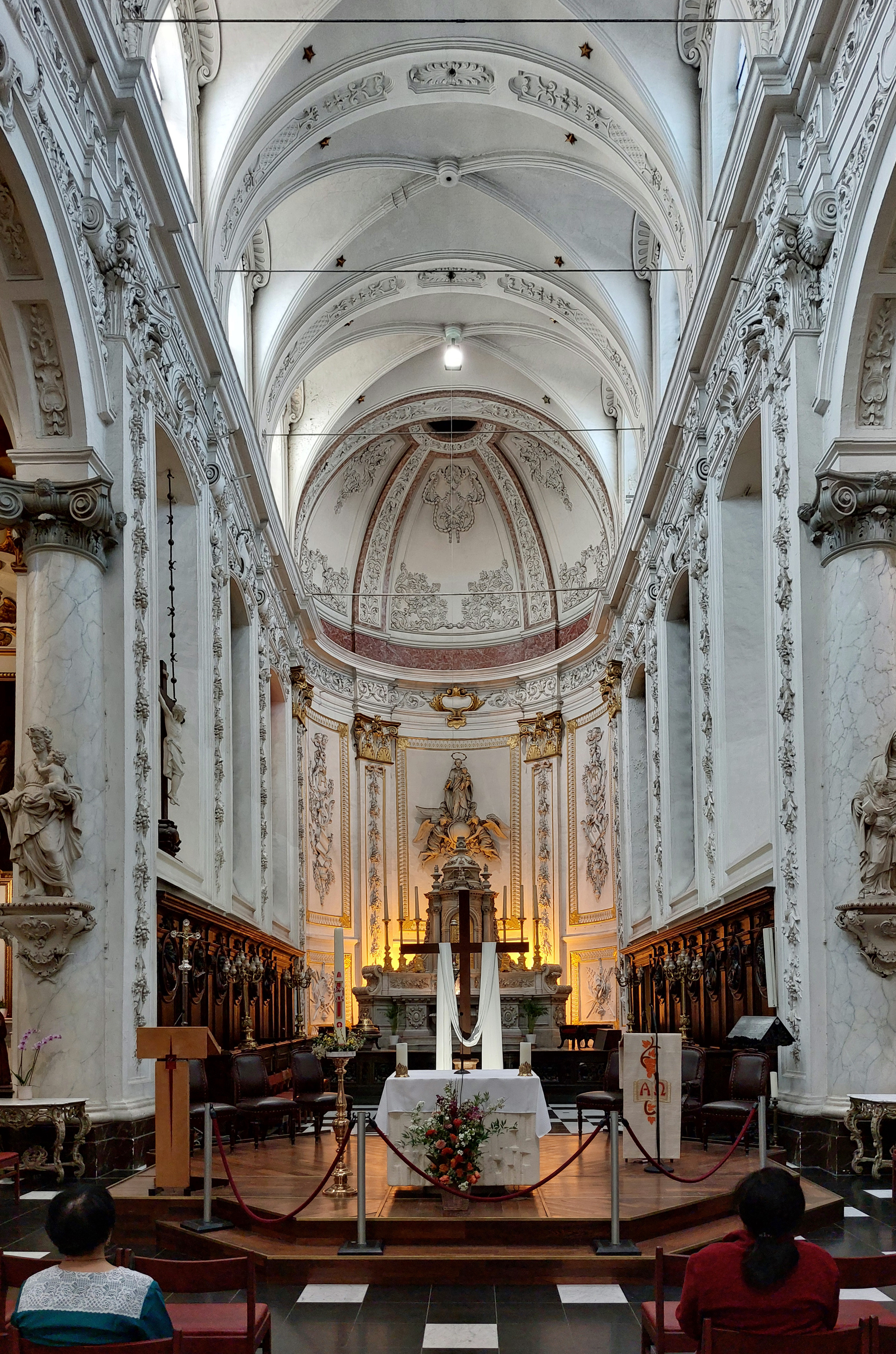
Main altar and choir

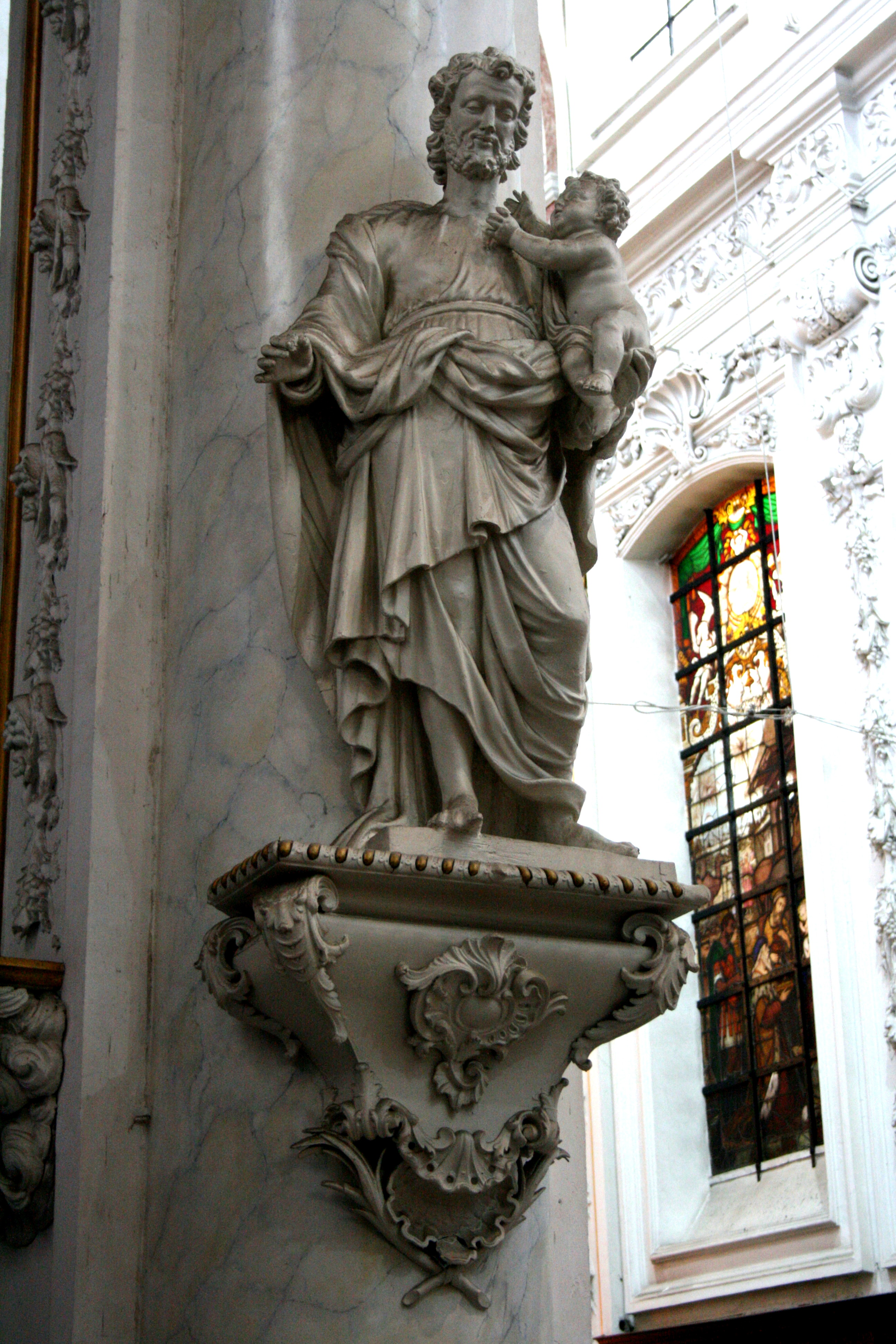
Statue in the nave

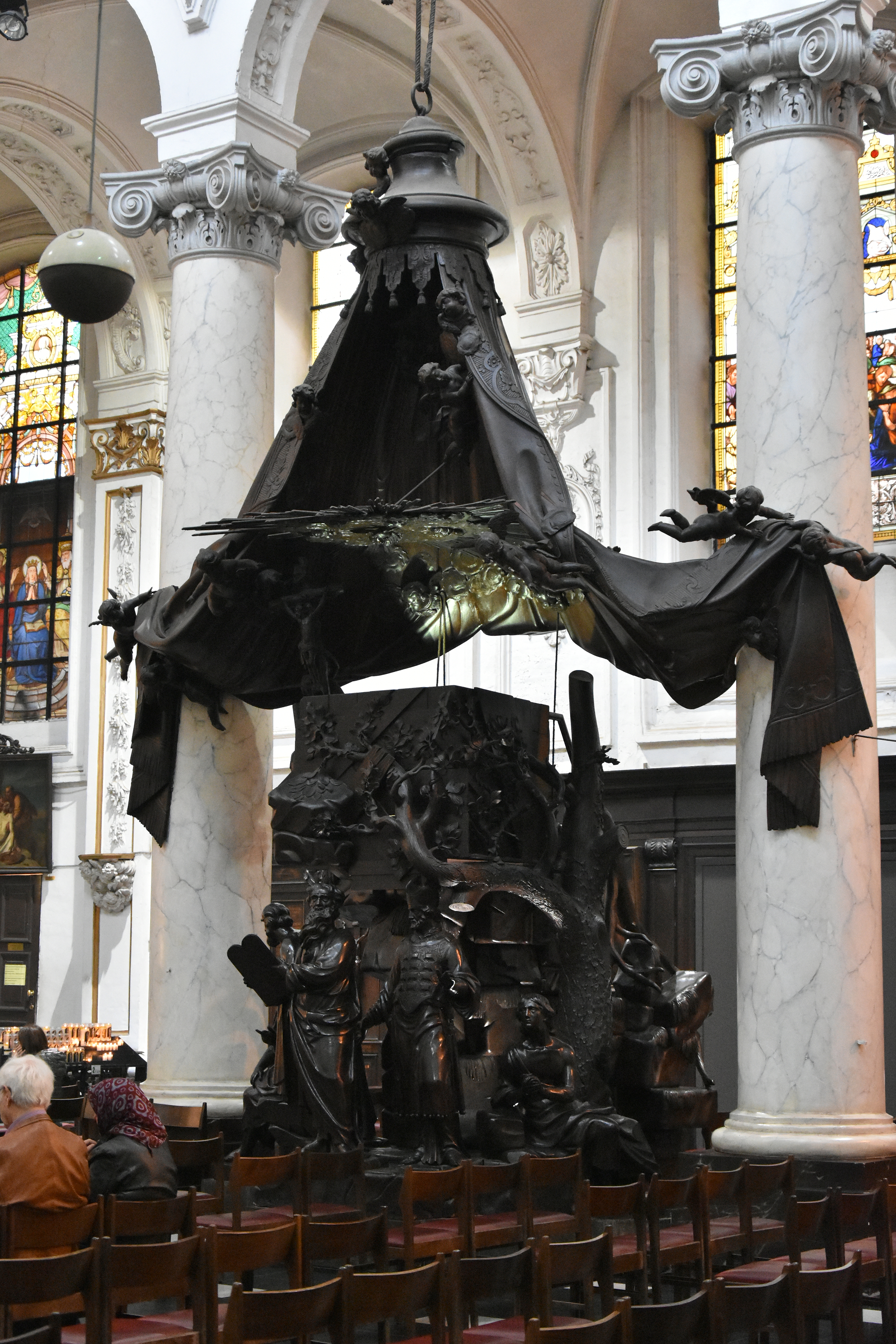
Pulpit by I. Duray Senior (1758)

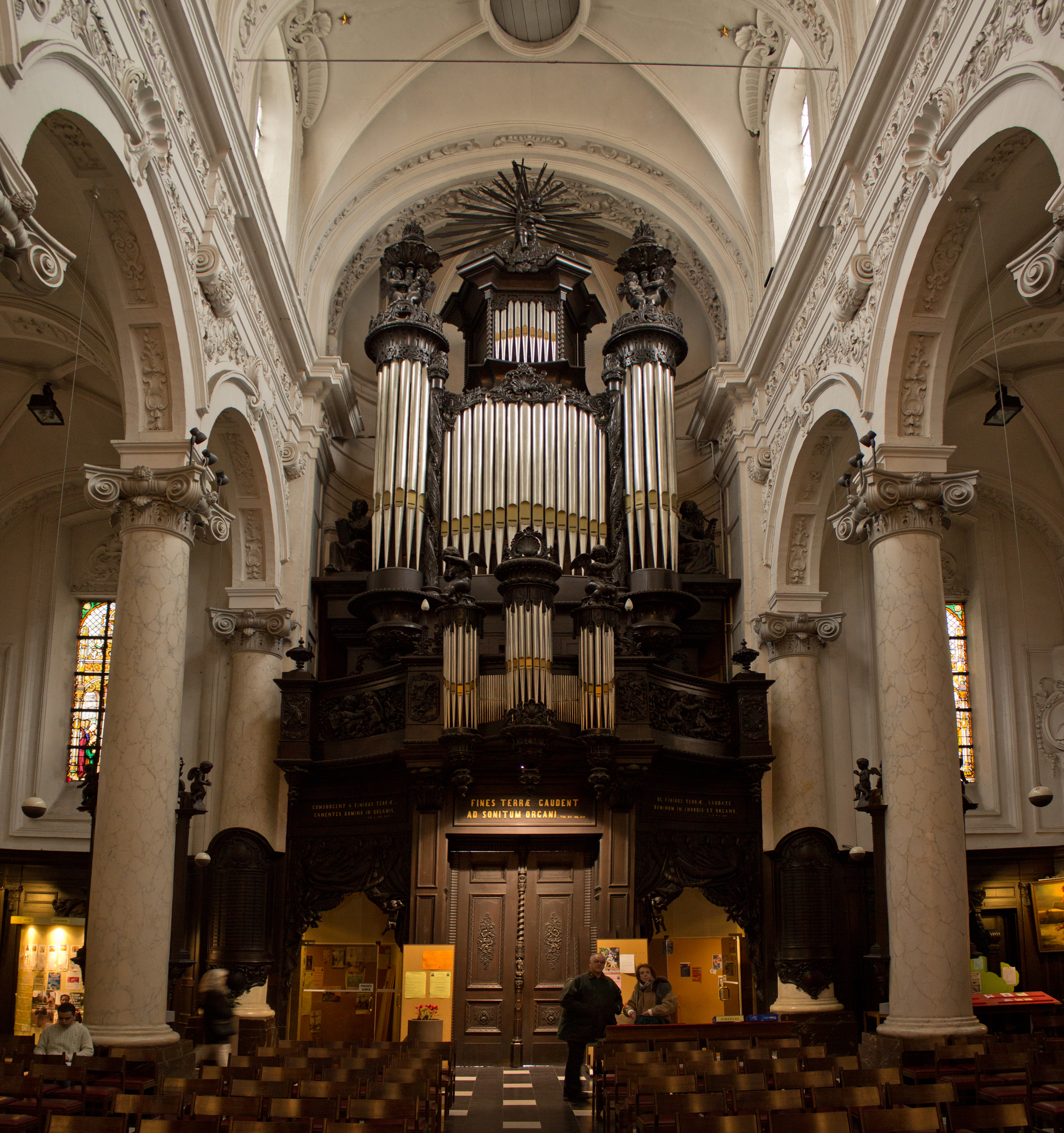
Organ by Hippolyte Loret (1848–1856)

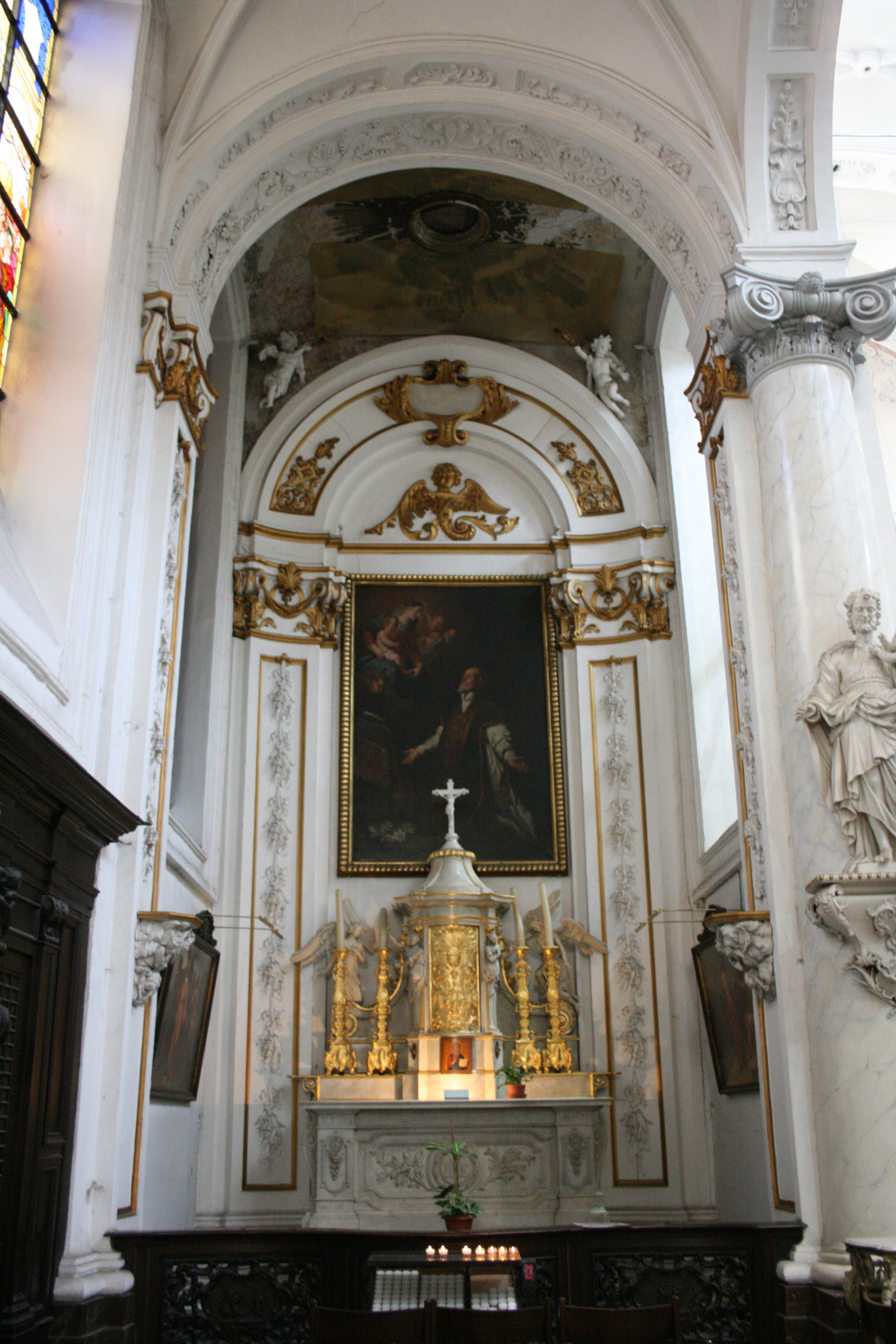
Side chapel

=== Chapel of Our Lady of Good Fortune ===
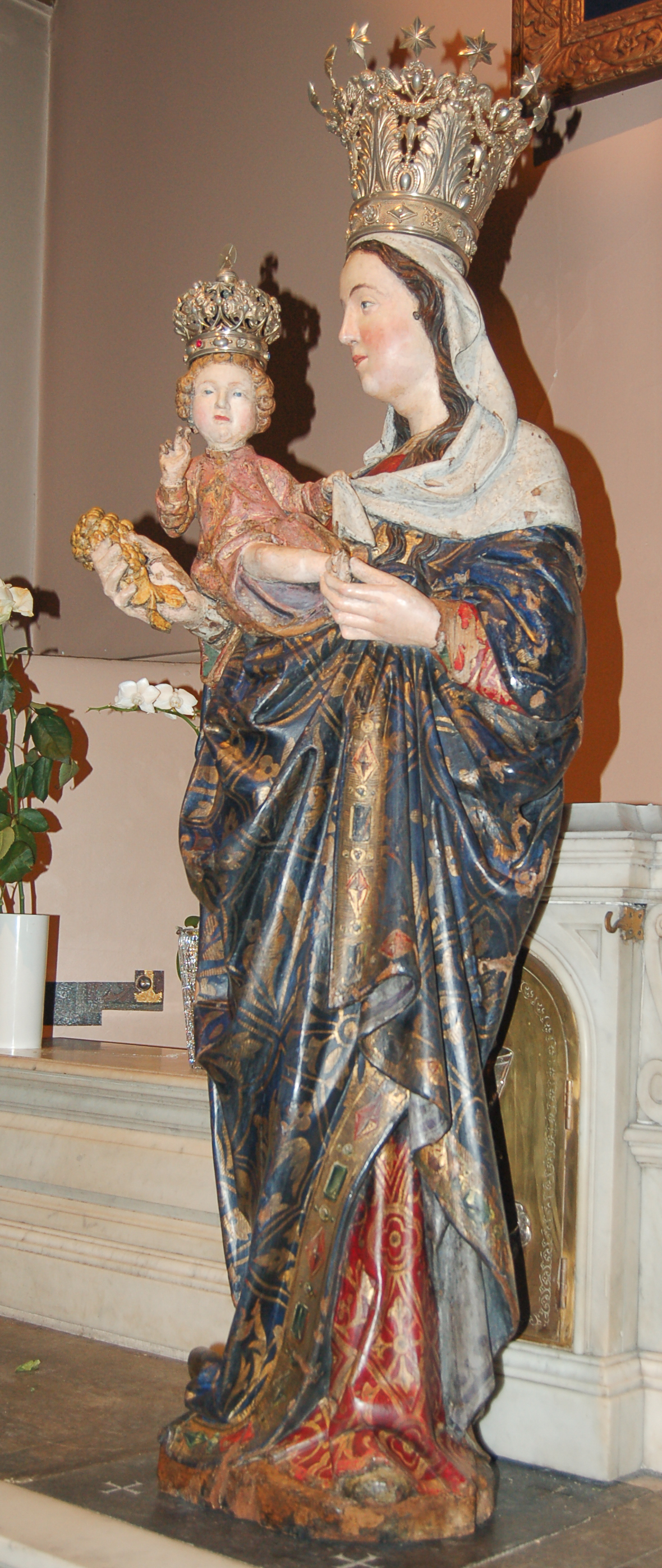
Notre Dame du Bon Succès (16th century)

Another polychrome wooden statuette of a Madonna and Child (Sedes Sapientiae) has found a home in the church; it is said to bring good luck in games of chance and in examinations. Originally from St Machar's Cathedral in Aberdeen, Scotland, it is believed to have been sent to Dunkirk by William Laing, the Procurer for the King of Spain. The statue came to Brussels in 1625, where it was venerated in the Temple of the Augustinians. It was transferred to Finisterrae in 1814, when the Augustinian Temple became a Protestant place of worship. Due to the large number of faithful who came to pray to Notre Dame du Bon Succès ("Our Lady of Good Fortune"), a side chapel was built in 1852 to house it.

== See also ==
- List of churches in Brussels
- Catholic Church in Belgium
- History of Brussels
- Culture of Belgium
