= Antoine d'Arces =

French nobleman

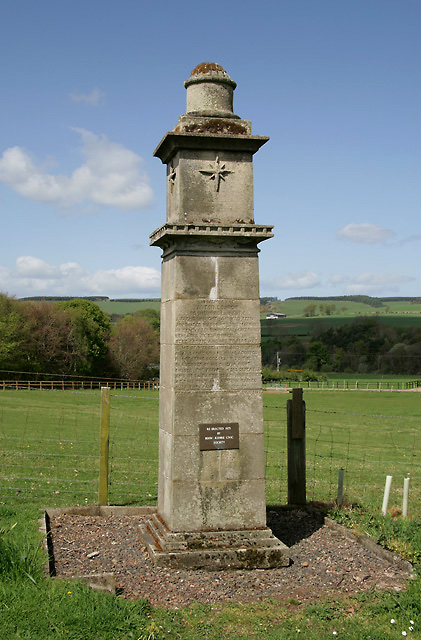
Monument to Antoine d'Arcy, close to the site of his murder near Preston, Scottish Borders

Antoine d'Arcy, sieur de la Bastie-sur-Meylan and of Lissieu, (d. 17 September 1517) was a French nobleman involved in the government of Scotland.

== The White Knight ==
Antoine d'Arces, or d'Arcy, is usually known as "De la Bastie" or "Labatie" in Scottish history. He was the son of Jesus d'Arces, sieur de la Bâtie and Anthoinette Baile (or Huguette). In his lifetime he was called the White Knight, (Chevalier Blanc), from his white clothes, white armour, or a white scarf worn as the favour of Anne of Brittany. Antoine came to Scotland for the notable tournaments of James IV and the king's marriage to Margaret Tudor in 1502, and he was a friend of John Stewart, Duke of Albany. Antoine issued an international 'cartel' - a tournament challenge, in 1506, and travelled to Scotland where he stayed for 18 weeks at the king's expense. He jousted with James Hamilton, 1st Earl of Arran at Stirling Castle in January 1507. James IV gave him 400 crowns and paid for his horse's hoofs to be bathed in wine. He returned to France with the Archdeacon of St Andrews, Gavin Dunbar on the Treasurer on 18 May 1507.

He served in the Italian Wars and was captured at Agnadello in 1509 by the Venetians. Antoine married Françoise de Ferrières, dame de Livarol. They had two children; Jean d'Arces, baron de Livarol, and Anne.

== Albany's Lieutenant ==
He came to Scotland immediately after the Scots' defeat at Flodden to help form Albany's government. Antoine returned with some ships of the Royal Scots Navy which had been lent to France. As a French ambassador, his instructions from Louis XII of France dated 5 October 1513 include: commiserating with Margaret Tudor; finding out the circumstances of James's death at Flodden; and going to Denmark to give an account of the state of Auld Alliance. Albany also gave him instructions. With a colleague, Master James Ogilvy, de la Bastie represented French interest at a parliament or council at Perth, 26 November 1513, which called for French aid and the return of Albany to be Regent of Scotland. Antoine went to Christian II of Denmark with Sir Andrew Brownhill in January 1514. He was to promote the mutual benefits of the Danish king's marriage to a French noblewoman, Madeleine de La Tour d'Auvergne, Albany's sister-in-law.

Antoine received a royal charter in September 1516 allowing him to profit from customs at the Port of Leith. Antoine was made Deputy Governor and Warden of Scottish Marches, and was the keeper of Dunbar Castle. On 25 April 1517 he was made the King's Lieutenant between the Merse and Lothian. At Dunbar and at Edinburgh Castle, he was involved in the design and construction of artillery fortifications. He had a company of 40 spearmen. In August 1517, during an outbreak of plague in the Edinburgh, James V of Scotland was moved to the care of De la Bastie at nearby rural Craigmillar Castle, where extra locks were bought for the royal lodging.

=== The Murder ===
In 1517, Antoine went to investigate the murder of a Frenchman who had been killed by the Clan Home in revenge for Albany's execution of Alexander Home, 3rd Lord Home. While pursuing David Home, Laird of Wedderburn and George Home, he was forced to retreat to Dunbar, but his horse got stuck in a marsh (which was for many years after called 'Batty's Bog'). George Home lopped off the White Knight's head and, it was said, threaded the diplomat's hair to his saddle cloth, then rode to Duns and set this trophy on a pole in the centre of the village. The chronicler Lindsay of Pitscottie writing in the 1570s tells the story;

"fearing ane conspiracie, he spurred his hors, and fled towardis the castle of Dunbar; thinking to have wone away, because he was weill horsed. But being ane stranger, and not knawing the ground weill, he laired his hors in ane mos, and thair his enemies cam upoun him, and slew and murthered him verrie unhonestlie, and cutted aff his head and carried with thame. And it was said that he had long hair plett in his neck quhilk David Home of Wedderburne knitt to his saidle bow and keipt it."

John Lesley's version, also written in the 1570s, differs only slightly. Antoine came to break Wedderburn's siege of Langton Castle, lured by a false report by William Cockburn, tutor of Langton, and according to his sixteenth century translator; "Bautie, tha heidet, and in the toun of Dunce his heid affixt on a staik, that all men mycht se it, September xix." By all accounts, the head was taken to Wedderburn Castle, and remained there for three hundred years.

This was a significant international incident, as de la Bastie was both Border Warden and French ambassador. Francis I of France wrote to the Parliament of Scotland on 16 November 1517 urging punishment. In response James Hamilton of Finnart carried the reply at the end of March 1528 that his father the Earl of Arran had captured the Home family strongholds, one Home had been hung drawn and quartered, and the others had escaped into England.

There is monument to Bastie at Preston, Scottish Borders, erected by General James Home in early 19th-century in honour of Antoine d'Arces. It consists of a square plinth and pedestal embossed with crosses with a classical cornice, topped by a stylised urn. Antoine's body was buried nearby, it is said, close to the scene of the murder in a field at Swallowdene farm.

== Portrait ==
A drawing of Antoine d'Arces made by an unknown artist in the 1560s is included in the album known as the Recueil d'Arras. The inscription mentions that he was called the White Knight, and went into Scotland with M. de Saint-Maurice, Guillaume Dorberke, and Jehan Joffroy sieur de Dompierre who was killed in the jousting.

== In literature ==
Antoine d'Arces is the inspiration for the fictional character Antoine de Lissieu, the hero of 2024 historical murder mystery The Trail of Blood, by A.K. Nairn. Several other characters in the novel are also based on real historical figures from this time and place, including John Stewart, Duke of Albany, Isabella Hoppringle and Alexander 3rd Lord Hume.

== Sources ==
- Buchanan, Patricia, Margaret Tudor, Scottish Academic Press, (1985)
- Wood, Marguerite, ed., Flodden Papers, Scottish History Society, (1933), diplomatic correspondence of James IV.
- Stuart, Marie W., The Scot who was a Frenchman, John Stewart Duke of Albany, Hodge, (1940)
- Tabraham, Chris (1997). Scotland's Castles. BT Batsford/Historic Scotland. ISBN 0-7134-7965-5.
