= Treasurer (warship) =

History

Scotland
- Fate: Wrecked c.1507

Treasurer was a Scottish warship in the Royal Scots Navy in the 16th century.

Treasurer was purchased by James IV of Scotland from a merchant of Le Conquet near Brest, and appears to have been commissioned by Robert Barton of Over Barnton. Treasurer sailed with the Margaret to Flanders on 29 August 1506, where George Corneton carried out some fitting. On 3 October 1506, a Breton, Martin Lenalt, brought her back. Andrew Barton was given money for the sailors' wages. According to John Lesley, she was wrecked on a rock off England while carrying the Archdeacon of St Andrews, Gavin Dunbar. Gavin Dunbar and Antoine d'Arces sailed on Treasurer on an embassy to Louis XII of France on 18 June 1507. On their return the ship was wrecked and the whole complement of 300 were captured but returned to Edinburgh by November 1508.
