= Rue Neuve, Brussels =

Street in Brussels, Belgium

Rue Neuve (French); Nieuwstraat (Dutch)
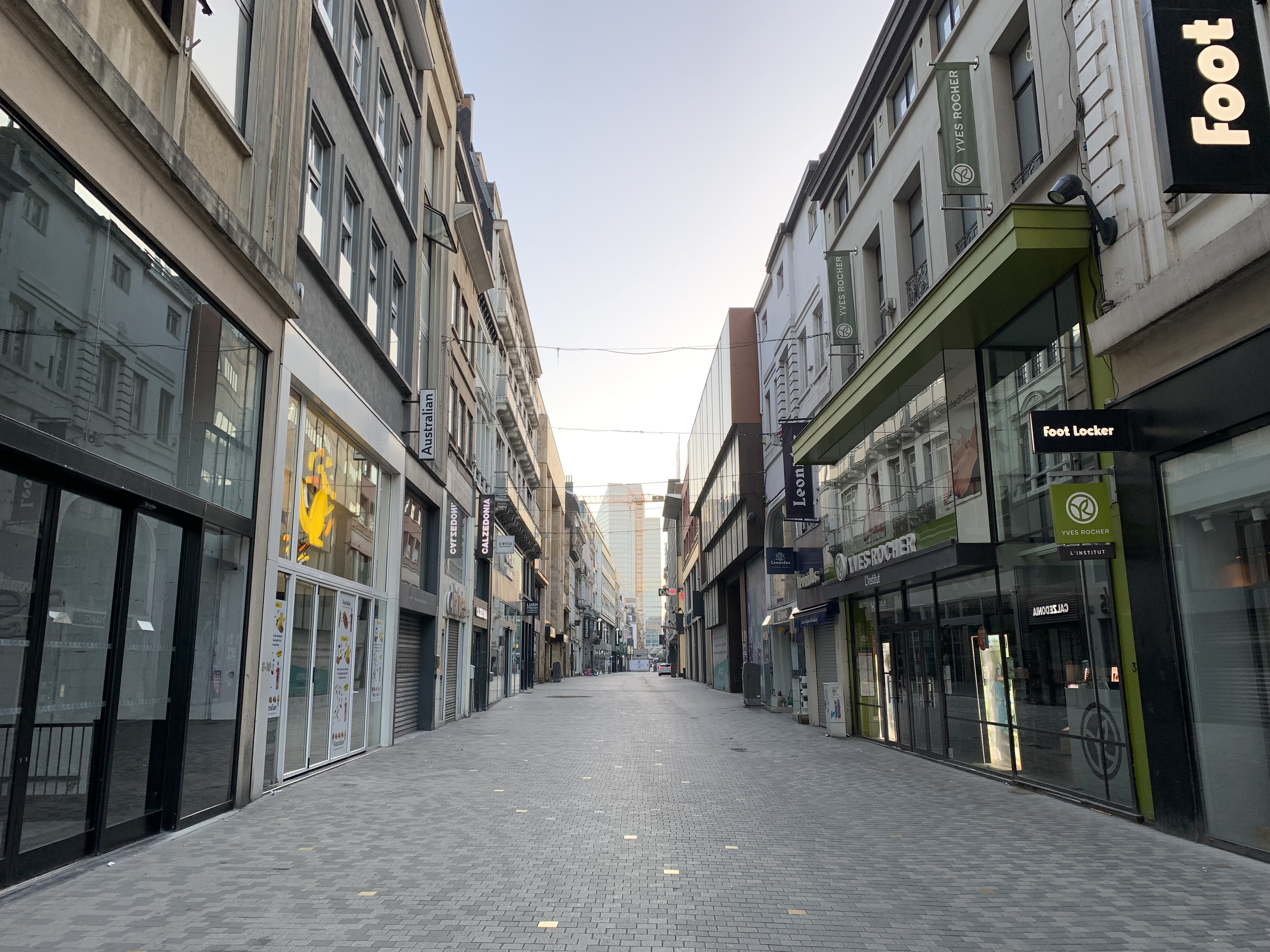
- The Rue Neuve/Nieuwstraat in Brussels

- Location within Brussels Location within Belgium
- Former names: Rue Notre-Dame (French); Onze-Lieve-Vrouwstraat (Dutch)
- Type: Street
- Location: City of Brussels, Brussels-Capital Region, Belgium
- Quarter: Marais–Jacqmain Quarter
- Postal code: 1000
- Coordinates: 50°51′11″N 04°21′23″E

The Rue Neuve (French, pronounced [ʁy nœv]) or Nieuwstraat (Dutch, pronounced [ˈniustraːt]), meaning "New Street", is a pedestrian street in central Brussels, Belgium. It runs between the Place de la Monnaie/Muntplein and the Rue du Fossé aux Loups/Wolvengracht to the south and the Place Charles Rogier/Karel Rogierplein and the Boulevard du Jardin botanique/Kruidtuinlaan to the north.

The Rue Neuve and its close surroundings are the second most popular shopping area in Belgium by number of shoppers, after Meir in Antwerp.

== History ==
The Rue Neuve was originally laid out in 1617, as part of larger urban development projects. It was first called the Rue Neuve Notre-Dame/Nieuwe-Lieve-Vrouwestraete ("Our Lady's New Street"), after the Church of Our Lady of Finisterrae, which now stands in the middle of the retail district, then the Longue Rue Neuve/Lange Nieuwstraat ("Long New Street"). At the end of the 18th century, it took the name Rue Van der Noot/Van der Nootstraat, after Henri Van der Noot, a leading figure of the Brabant Revolution, who lived at the corner of the Rue Saint-Michel/Sint-Michielsstraat.

In 1839, the street was extended in a straight line from the Rue de la Blanchisserie/Blekerijstraat to the Boulevard du Jardin botanique/Kruidtuinlaan, thus establishing a link to the new North Station. The proximity of the station led to the construction of hotels for travellers. After the creation of the South Station and the opening of the Rue du Midi/Zuidstraat, the Rue Neuve became part of Brussels' main north–south axis.

The street has been a centre of commercial activity since at least the end of the 19th century, and was known as a centre of luxury shopping in the early 20th century. Among the street's most famous stores were the Grands Magasins Leonhard Tietz and, above all, À L'Innovation, constructed by the leading Art Nouveau architect Victor Horta in 1901. The latter was destroyed in a fire on 22 May 1967, which killed 251 people and injured 62.

In the 20th century, the advent of cinematography led to a proliferation of cinemas, and from the 1920s onwards, the Rue Neuve became Brussels' cinema street. In 1932, the largest cinema in the city, the Métropole Cinema, designed in Art Deco style by the architect Adrien Blomme, was built there. The street was pedestrianised in 1975. The decline of cinema in the 1980s marked the triumph of commerce.

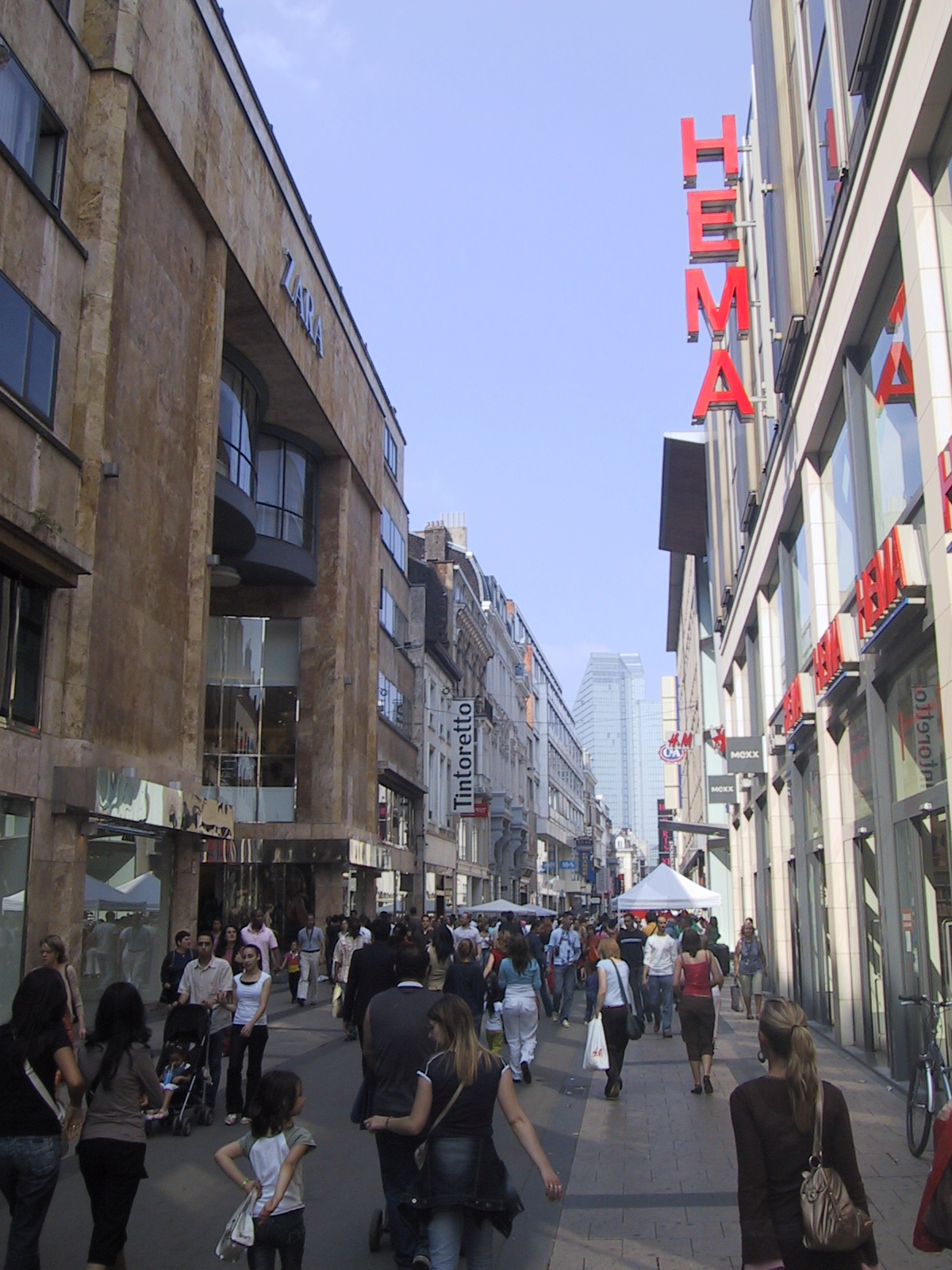
The Rue Neuve/Nieuwstraat on a busy day

Nowadays, the Rue Neuve is home to popular international chains (H&M, C&A, Zara, Primark), as well as the City 2 and Inno shopping galleries. The street has the second highest rents of any street in Belgium, at €1,600/square metre/year. (Note: The Meir shopping street in Antwerp ranks first, with €1,700/square metre/year) However, it has been criticised by some for being too "boring" architecturally, uniformly "mass market", lacking in independent retailers, without variety of uses, and with very few residents. The City of Brussels has plans to bring more residents to the street and to make it more "attractive".

== Notable buildings ==
- No. 30: Métropole Cinema (1932), an Art Deco cinema by Adrien Blomme, whose auditorium was decorated with a giant bas-relief by Ossip Zadkine. It now houses a Zara clothing store.
- No. 74: Church of Our Lady of Finisterrae, a Catholic church dating from the beginning of the 18th century, which has been listed as a protected monument since 1958.
- No. 111–123: Inno gallery, replacing the À L'Innovation department store by Victor Horta, which was destroyed in 1967.
- No. 123: City 2 gallery, partially located on the site where the Au Bon Marché department store used to stand.
Métropole Cinema (Blomme, 1932)

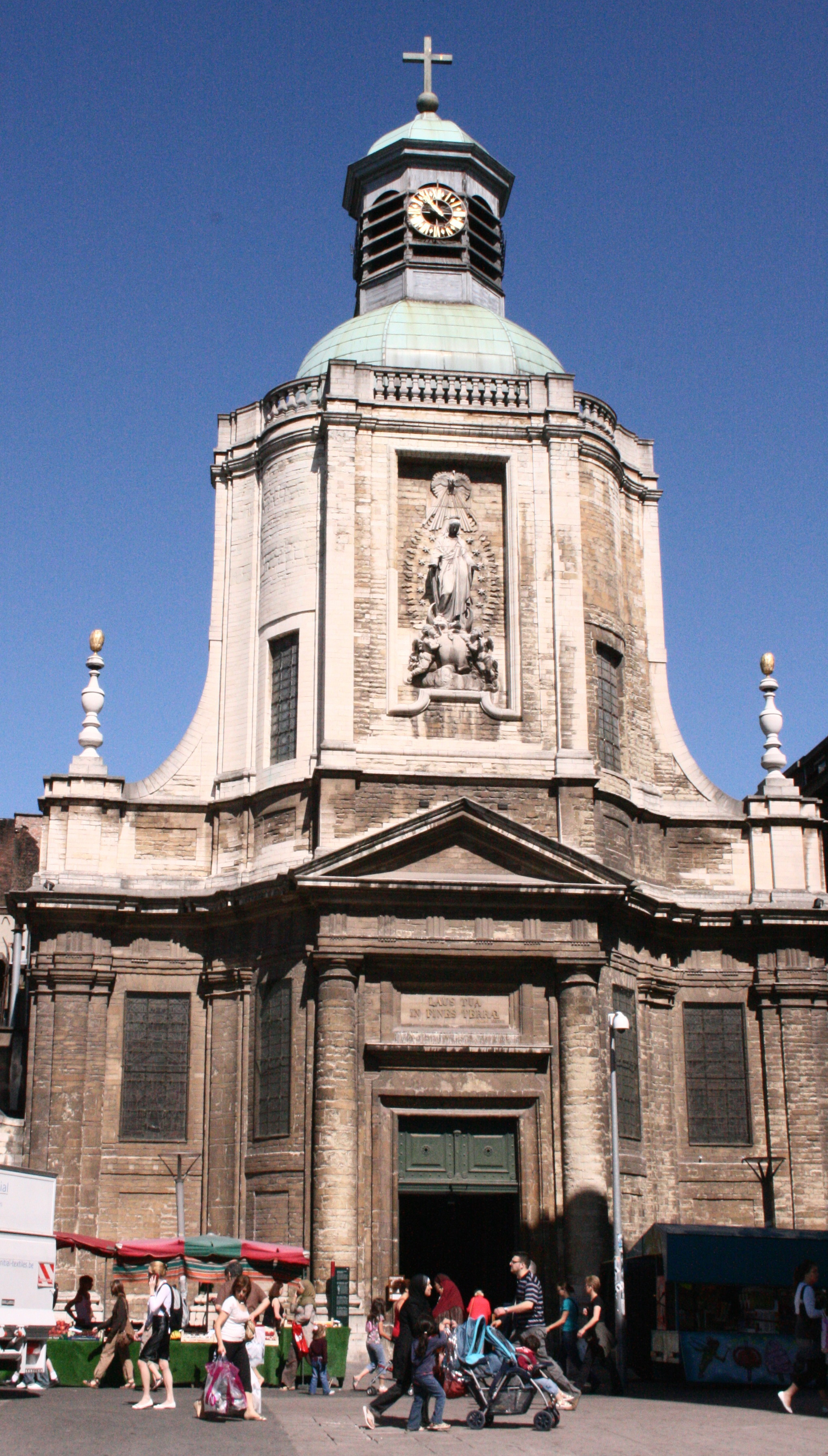
Church of Our Lady of Finisterrae

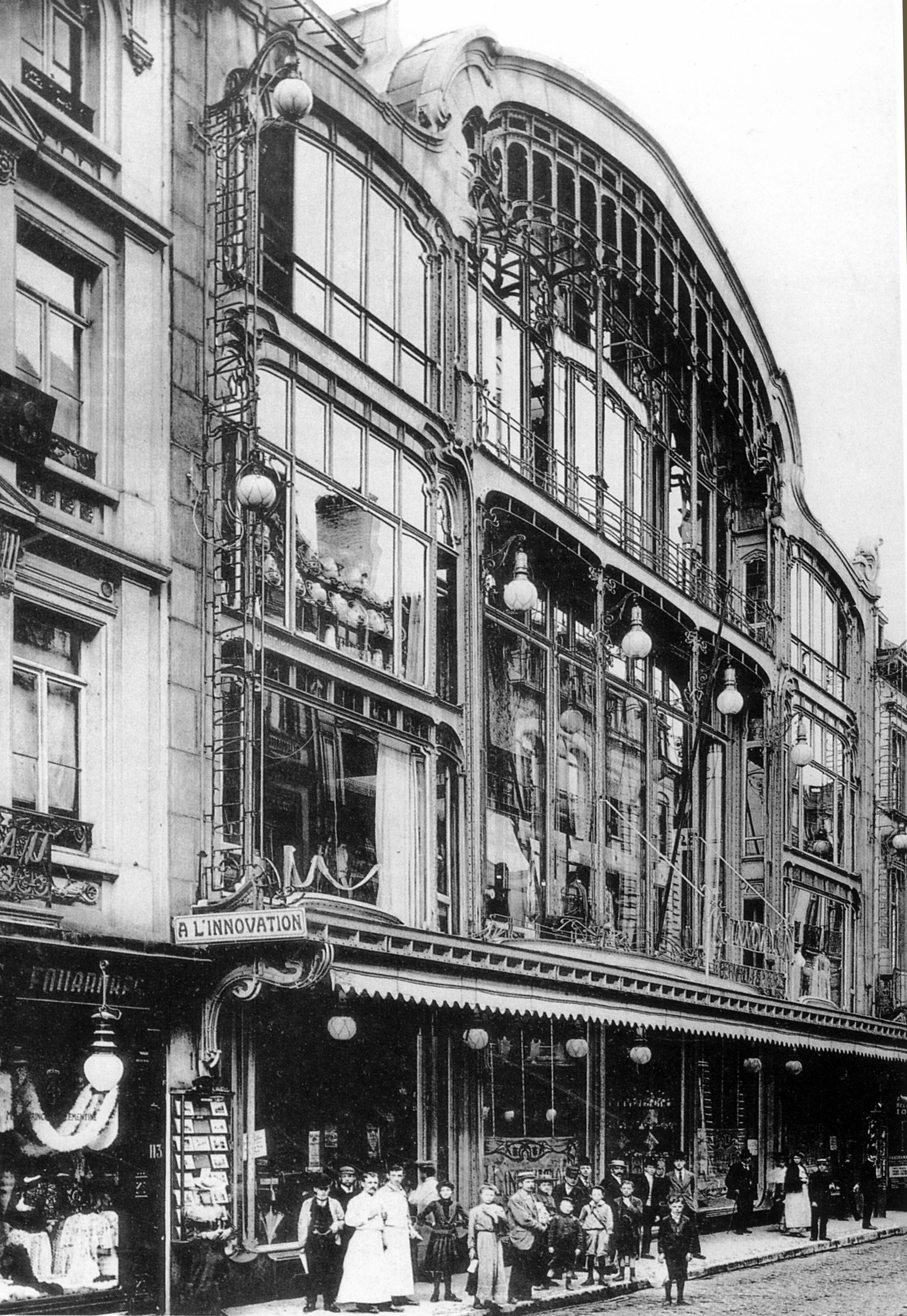
À L'Innovation (Horta, 1901) (demolished)

== See also ==
- List of streets in Brussels
- History of Brussels
- Belgium in the long nineteenth century
