= L'Innovation department store fire =

1967 fire in a department store in Brussels, Belgium

Coordinates: 50°51′11″N 4°21′24″E

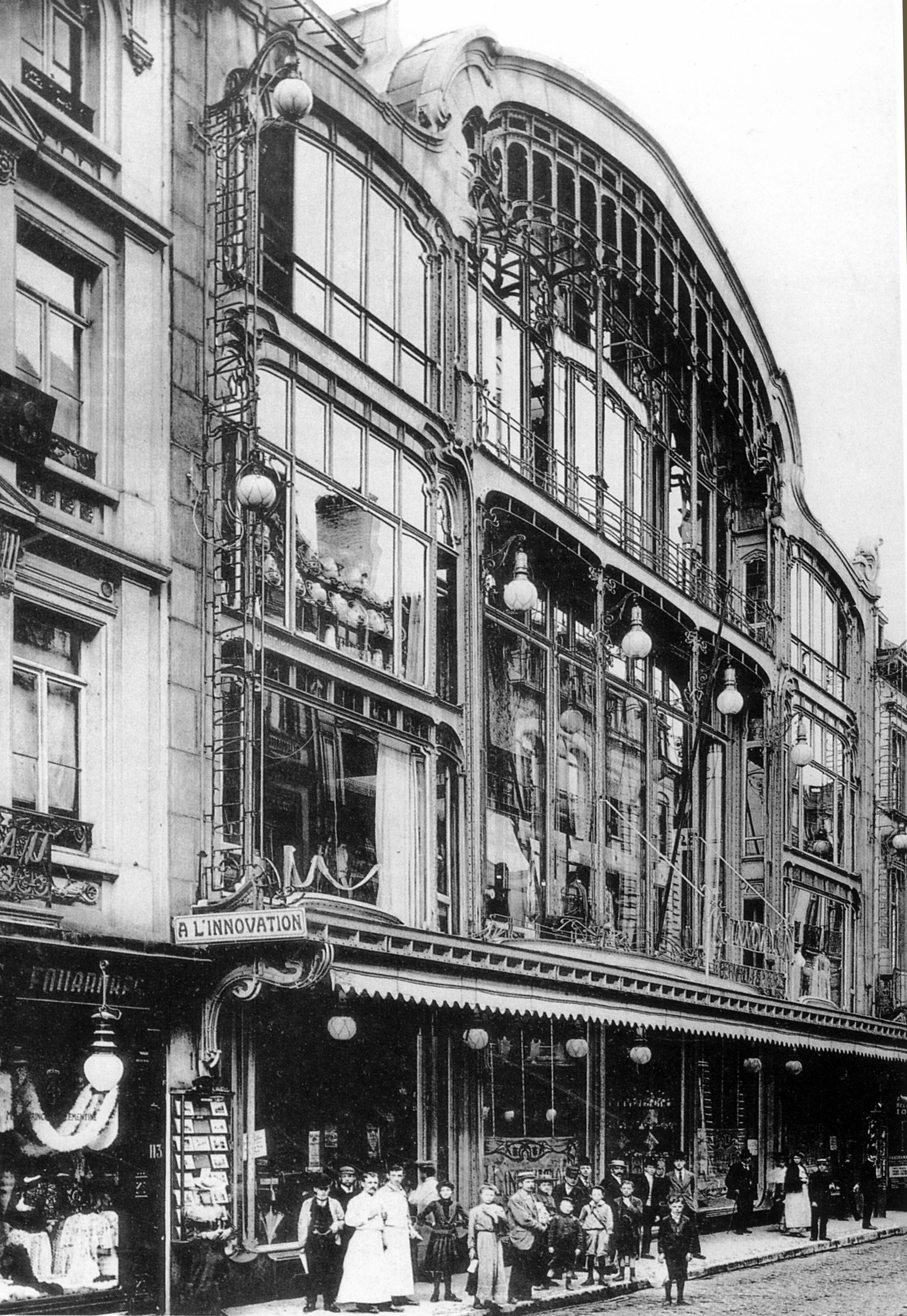
À L'Innovation department store in Brussels, pictured soon after its opening in 1901

The L'Innovation fire was a fire that took place at the À L'Innovation department store on the Rue Neuve/Nieuwstraat in central Brussels, Belgium, on 22 May 1967. More than 150 firefighters were mobilised to fight it, 251 people were killed, 62 injured, and the department store itself, the work of the Art Nouveau architect Victor Horta, was destroyed.

The L'Innovation fire remains the deadliest fire in Belgian history.

== The À L'Innovation store ==
The À L'Innovation department store was situated in central Brussels, on the fashionable Rue Neuve/Nieuwstraat, one of the main commercial streets in Belgium, located between the Place de la Monnaie/Muntplein and the Place Charles Rogier/Karel Rogierplein. It was housed in a purpose-built edifice constructed by the leading Art Nouveau architect Victor Horta in 1901.

The store was subsequently radically altered over the years by integrating various neighbouring buildings to finally have five floors and a total of 24,000 m^{2} (260,000 sq ft) of shelving and 8,000 m^{2} (86,000 sq ft) of warehouses. By the time of the fire, in 1967, it was one of the main department stores in Belgium with daily takings of 30 million Belgian francs. (Note: This amount is roughly equivalent to €4.3 million today when taking into account inflation.) It was described as a "Temple of fashion, palace of housewives, luxury bazaar where you could [almost] find anything."

== Context and fire ==
An exhibit featuring American merchandise that began on 5 May and included blue jeans, barbecue equipment and paper dolls had created outrage among a pro-China group called "Action for the Peace and Independence of Peoples". In the days leading up to the fire, picketing outside the store had taken place, while pamphlets promising greater conflict also circulated.

The blaze began in the five-storey structure at approximately 13:30 when more than 1,000 people were in the store. The store was built with an atrium in its centre, open to all floors and topped with a skylight, an architecture that behaved like a chimney giving a steady air draft to the store's wooden floors and walls. Cries of "fire!" caused panic, with virtually the entire store engulfed in just 10 minutes. No sprinkler system or other active fire-fighting system was present. Many shoppers rushed to windows, since the main stairway was enveloped in thick black smoke, while some jumped to their deaths before fire ladders arrived. Others still went to the roof and escaped via nearby buildings. Some employees, having become used to the exploding fireworks that protestors had set off, ignored pleas to leave the building until it was too late.

== Investigation ==
The origin of the fire was a source of confusion, with store management first stating that the inferno began in the first-floor children's wear department. That was a contradiction of witnesses who had seen exploding butane canisters in the third floor camping department, as well as fourth floor problems in the kitchen of the store's restaurant. In the aftermath of the fire, there was speculation that it might have been started by anti-American, Maoist protestors in the context of the Cold War and opposition movements against the United States involvement in the Vietnam War. Further controversy came about when one witness claimed to have heard one person shout after the fire began, "I am giving my life for Vietnam!".

== Aftermath ==
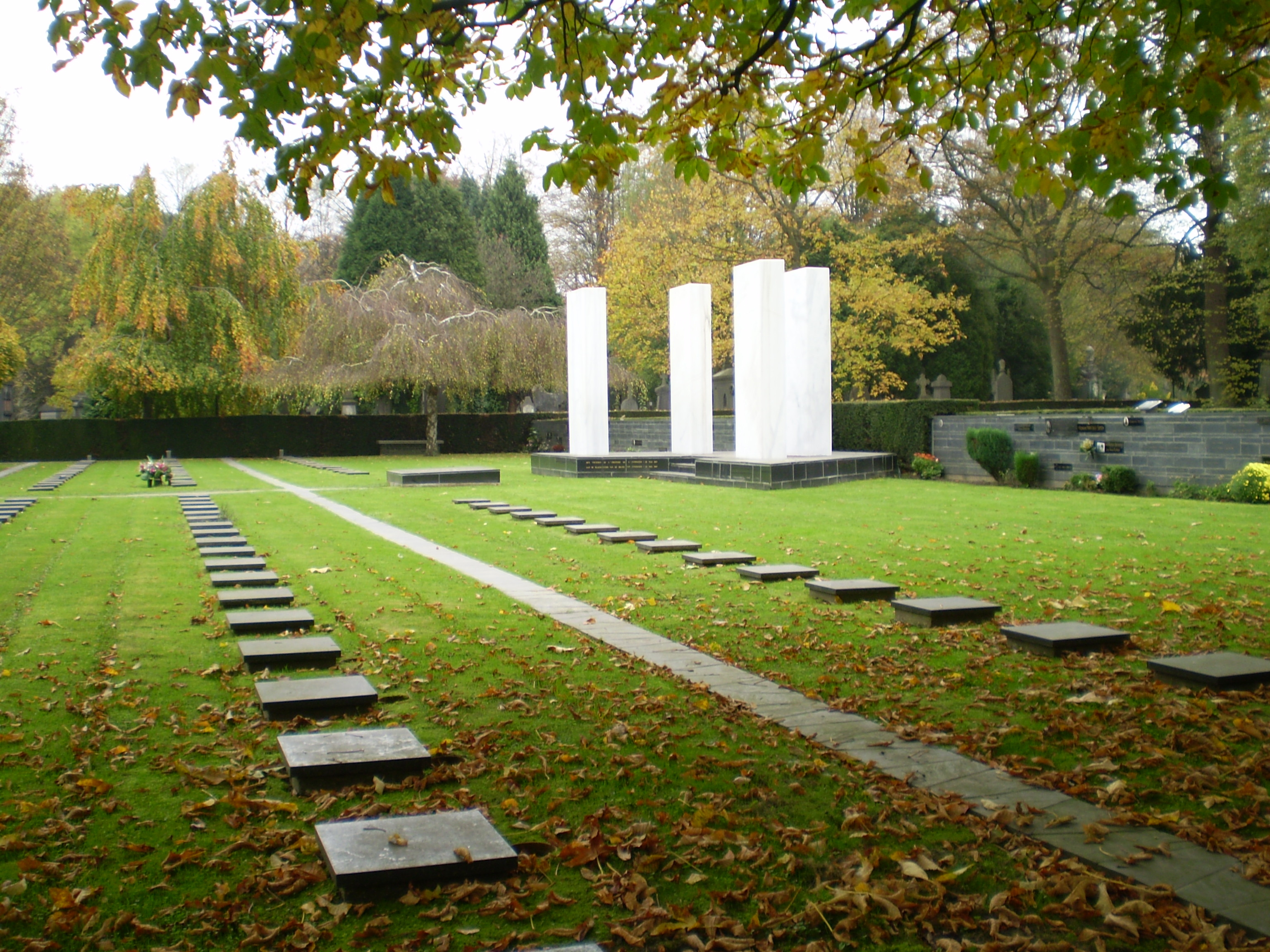
Memorial to the victims of the L'Innovation fire in Evere, Brussels

On 30 May, a funeral service for the victims, attended by Belgium's King Baudouin and Queen Fabiola, was held at the Basilica of the Sacred Heart. Other towns also held funeral masses. The fire marked the worst single-building fire worldwide since the 1961 Niteroi circus fire in Brazil, and was Belgium's greatest disaster since the August 1956 coal mine fire at the Bois du Cazier colliery at Marcinelle, in Hainaut.

== Depiction in media ==
A Belgian art historian who lost his parents in the fire published a novel about the history of the event and included testimonies from survivors, called Happening. The Belgian director Jan Verheyen announced in 2021 that he was preparing to make a movie with the same title as the novel about the disaster.

== See also ==
- Art Nouveau in Brussels
- History of Brussels
