= Neustraße/Nieuwstraat (Herzogenrath/Kerkrade) =

Coordinates: 50°51′17″N 6°04′33″E

The Neustraße (German, pronounced [ˈnɔʏˌʃtʁaːsə]) or Nieuwstraat (Dutch, pronounced [ˈniuˌstraːt]) (both lit. 'New Street') is a road that is both in the German town of Herzogenrath and in the Dutch town of Kerkrade.

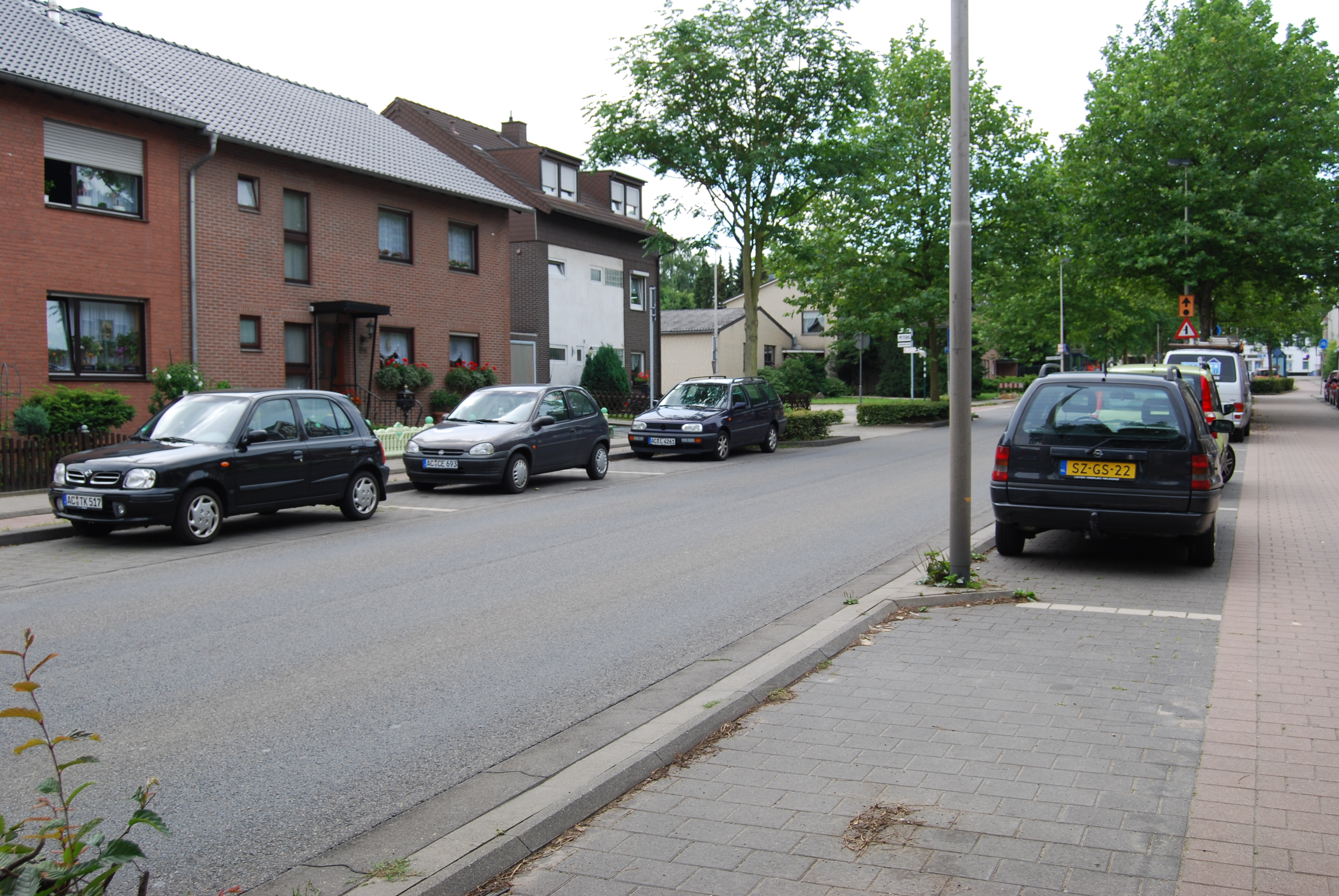
On the left hand side is the Neustraße in Herzogenrath, Germany; on the right hand side the Nieuwstraat in Kerkrade, Netherlands (therefore, in this image, the Dutch-registered car (yellow plate) happens to be parked in the Netherlands, while the German-registered ones (white plates) are parked in Germany).
