= Inno =

Belgian department store chain

INNOvative Retail BV
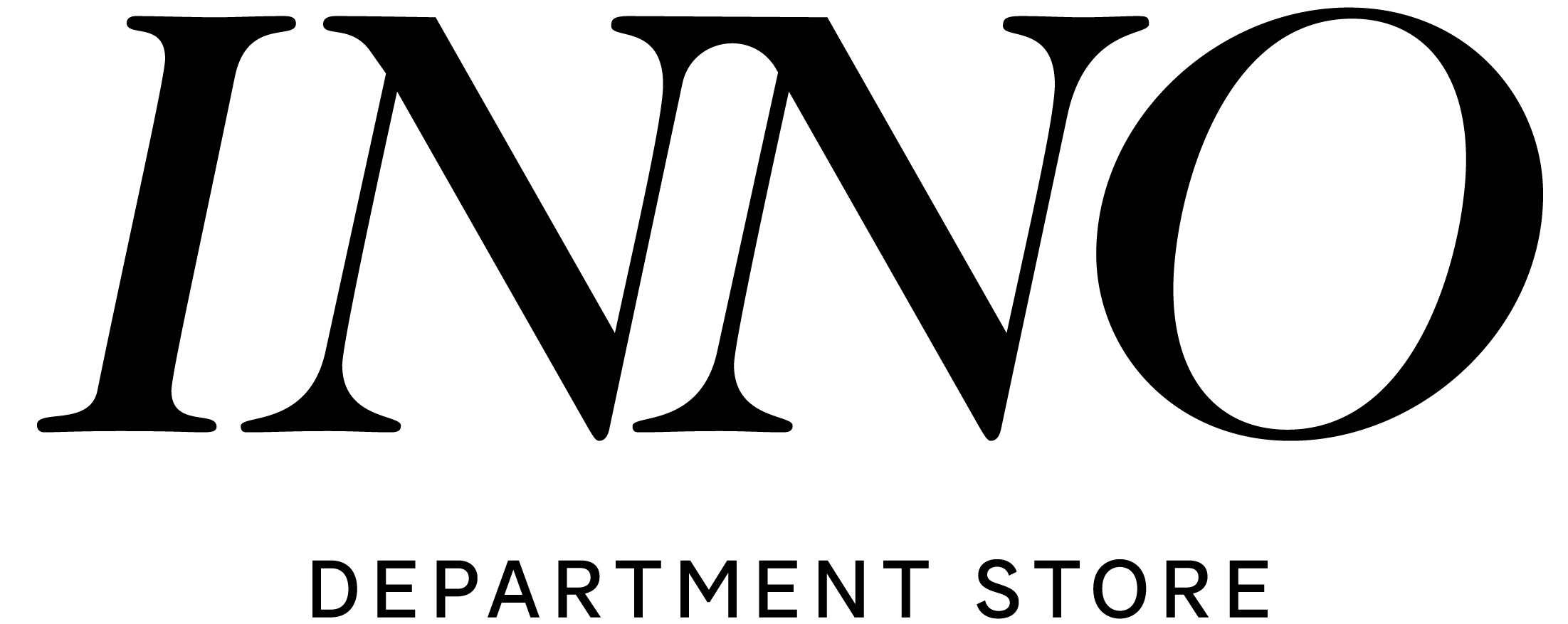

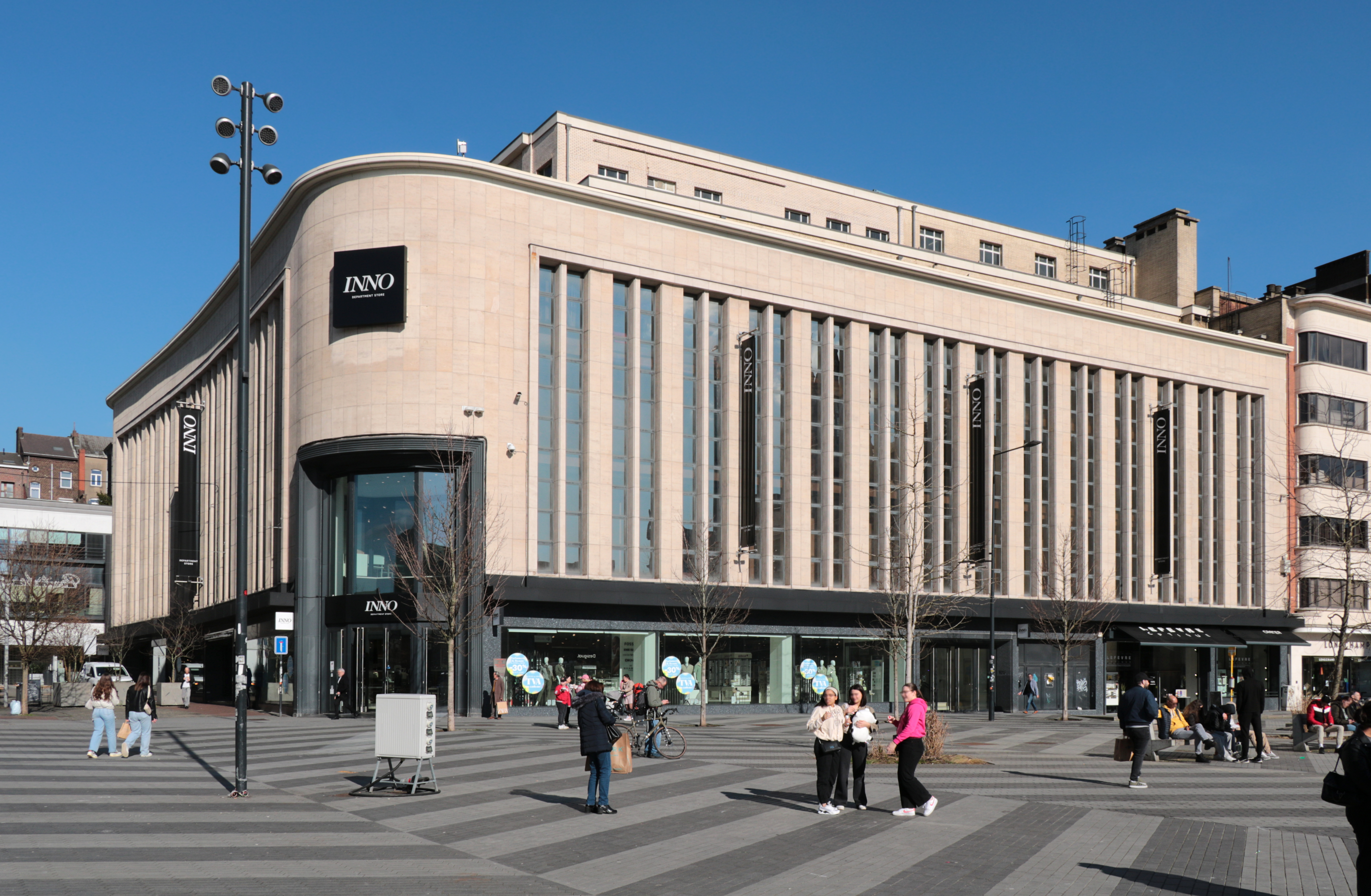
- INNO Charleroi (2024)
- Industry: Retail
- Genre: Department store
- Founded: May 1897; 129 years ago in Brussels, Belgium
- Founder: Julien Bernheim
- Number of locations: 16
- Area served: Belgium
- Website: inno.be

INNOvative Retail BV, (commonly referred to as Inno, and formerly known as Galeria Inno) is an upmarket Belgian department store chain that operates sixteen branches around Belgium.

== History ==
In May 1897, À l'Innovation opened in Brussels. The department store was founded by Julien Bernheim.

The chain is a founding member of the International Association of Department Stores, but membership ended in 2001. Emile Bernheim (son of Julien and president of Inno from the 1920s) was president of the association in 1931, 1935, 1950 and 1960.

In 1925, following the death of Julien Bernheim, his son Émile Bernheim became head of the company.

The Rue Neuve flagship (constructed between 1901 and 1903 and designed by Victor Horta) was destroyed in a fire on 22 May 1967, which killed either 251 or 325 people depending on the source. The incident is the deadliest fire in Belgian history. After this incident, the department store rebranded from Innovation to Inno.

Inno expanded into France in March 1962 with a hypermarket format, however in 1964 due to poor sales a majority stake in Inno-France was sold to Galeries Lafayette. The management of the stores was taken over by Galeries Lafayette in 1965, in 1971 the stake was upped to 88% and Inno no longer held shares in the company. The management of Inno France was taken over by Monoprix and in 2013 the final Inno-France stores were closed.

In 1969, the company merged with Bon Marché (unrelated to the French Le Bon Marché) to create Inno-BM. Then in 1974 Inno-BM merges with GB to create GB-Inno-BM (later renamed to GIB Group).

Galeria Kaufhof purchased the chain in April 2001, with this Galeria was added to the chain's name to become Galeria Inno. In 2015, Hudson's Bay Company purchased a majority of Galeria Kaufhof from Metro AG.

In 2018, Galeria Kaufhof merged with Karstadt to form Galeria Karstadt Kaufhof. In 2019, HBC divested its shares in the company and Signa Holding took full control.

The chain rebranded from Galeria Inno to Inno in 2021 and for the first time the brand opened a web shop. A new store format also began to be rolled out across the brand beginning with the Schoten branch in 2020.

Former logo used from 2004 to 2021

Plans to sell Galeria Inno were announced in late 2023. In July 2024, Axcent (Swedish retail group, majority shareholder of Åhléns) and Skel (Icelandic investment group) announced they would purchase the company for an undisclosed amount.

== Locations ==
INNO operates 16 department stores throughout Belgium, of which four are located in Brussels: Inno Bascule, Inno Louise, Inno Rue Neuve, and Inno Woluwe.
