= St Peter's Church, Aberdeen =

Coordinates: 57.1488°N 2.0920°W

St Peter's Church
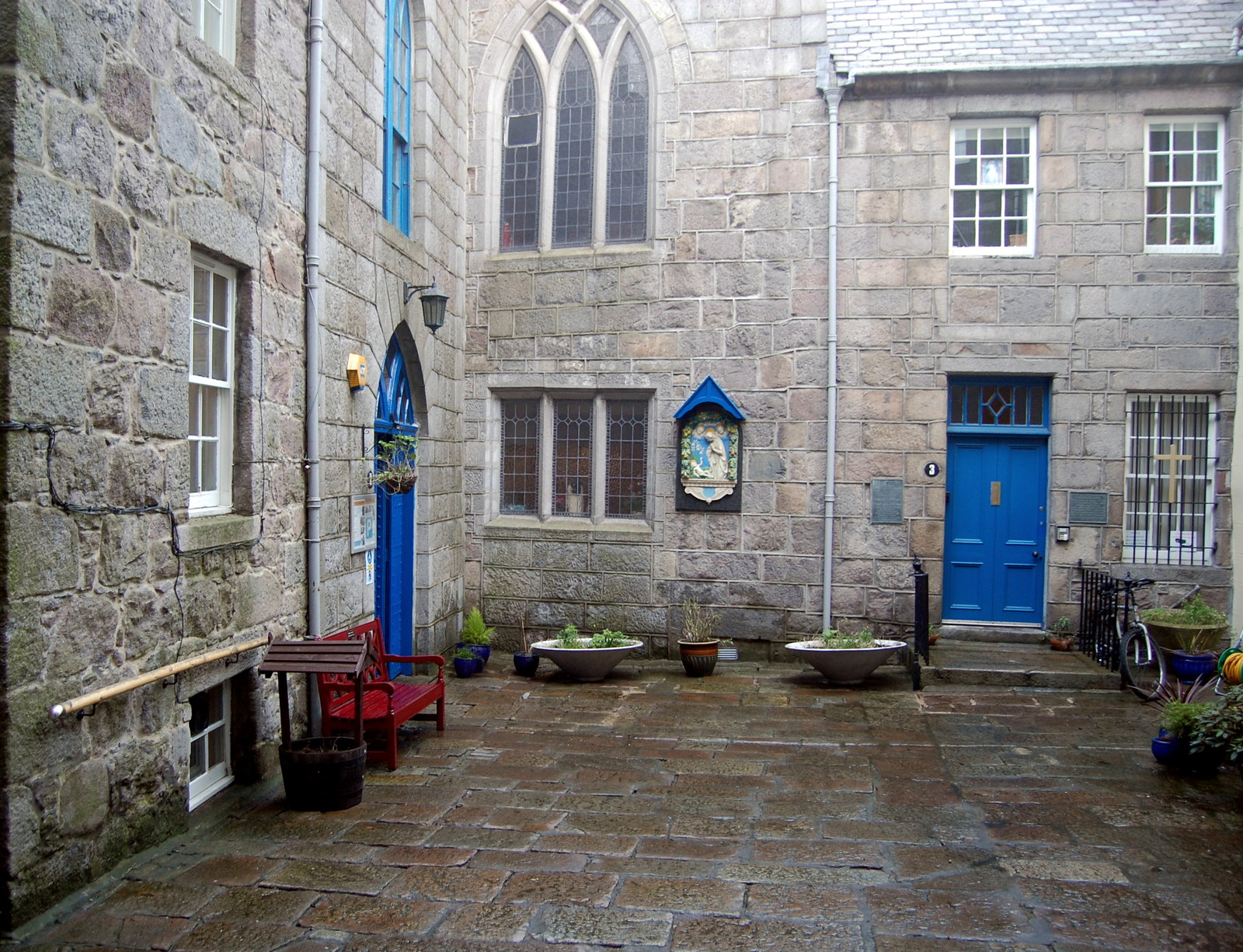
- Church entrance

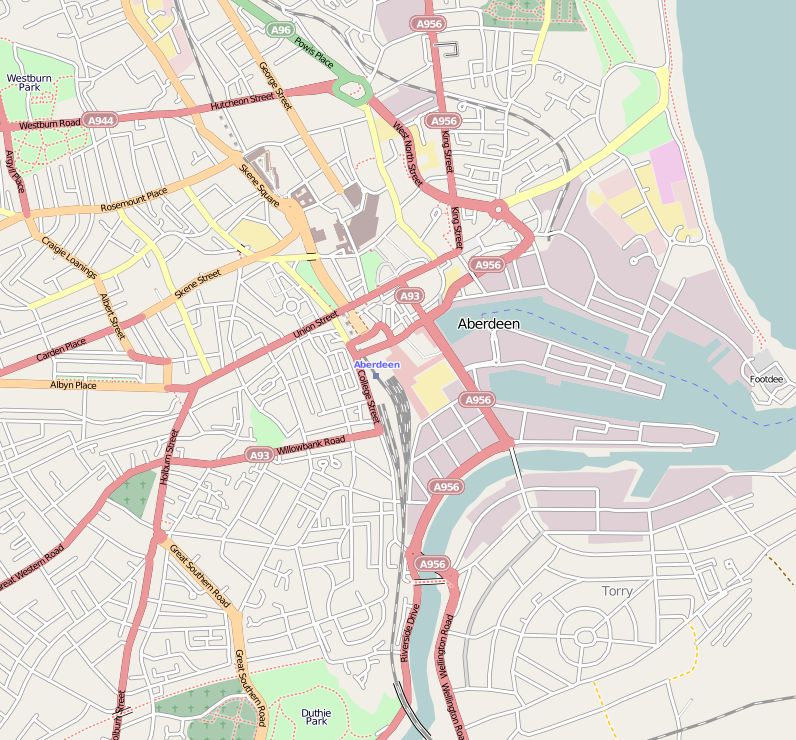
- Location in Aberdeen
- Location: Aberdeen
- Country: Scotland
- Denomination: Roman Catholic
- Website: St Peter's Parish, Aberdeen

History
- Status: Parish church
- Founder: Fr Charles Gordon
- Dedication: Saint Peter
- Dedicated: 19 August 1804

Architecture
- Functional status: Active
- Heritage designation: Category B listed
- Designated: 12 January 1967
- Architect(s): James Massie; Harry Leith
- Style: Gothic Revival
- Groundbreaking: 15 April 1803
- Completed: 1817
- Construction cost: £1,049

Administration
- Province: St Andrews and Edinburgh
- Diocese: Aberdeen

St Peter's Church is a Roman Catholic Parish church in Aberdeen, Scotland. It was built from 1803 and opened in 1804. It is situated on Justice Street between Peacock's Close and Market Stance, next to St Andrew's Cathedral in the centre of the city. It was the first permanent Roman Catholic Church to be built in Aberdeen after the Reformation and is a category B listed building.

== History ==
=== Foundation ===
In 1774, a small chapel was built on the site of the present church. It was on the ground floor of a house and had a residence above it. The resident priest there was the Vicar Apostolic of the Lowland District, James Grant. In July 1795, Fr Charles Gordon became the resident priest in Aberdeen.

=== Construction ===
In early 1803, materials and funds for the construction of a church were collected by Fr Gordon. The chapel became too small for the increasing Catholic population of the city and a new, larger church needed to be built. On 24 February 1803, digging started on the site. On 15 April 1803, the foundation stone was laid by Fr Gordon. He estimated that the total cost of the church would be £1,049. It was designed by the architect James Massie in the Gothic Revival style. The first Mass was said in the next building on 13 November 1803. Construction continued on the site until August 1804. On 19 August 1804, the church was dedicated by the Vicar Apostolic of the Lowland District, Alexander Cameron.

In 1815, a gallery was added to the church. In 1817, the church façade was finished. It was designed by Harry Leith. From 1895 to 1899, the High altar was installed in the church. It was designed and built in Belgium.

=== Closure and reopening ===
In 1860, the church was closed, because St Mary's Cathedral had opened. For the proceeding two years, the church was used as a chapel for a nearby boys' school. In 1862, the presbytery became a "home for the aged and infirm" run by a group of religious sisters from Hammersmith. In 1872, the church was closed again. In 1880, it finally re-opened.

== Parish ==
Within the parish is the Catholic Chaplaincy of the University of Aberdeen. Sunday Mass for the chaplaincy is at 6:30pm in the university's King's College Chapel.

There are two Sunday Masses in St Peter's Church: 6:00pm on Saturday and 11:30am on Sunday.

== See also ==
- Roman Catholic Diocese of Aberdeen
