= Gavin Dunbar (bishop of Aberdeen) =

Scottish bishop

- Bishop of Aberdeen
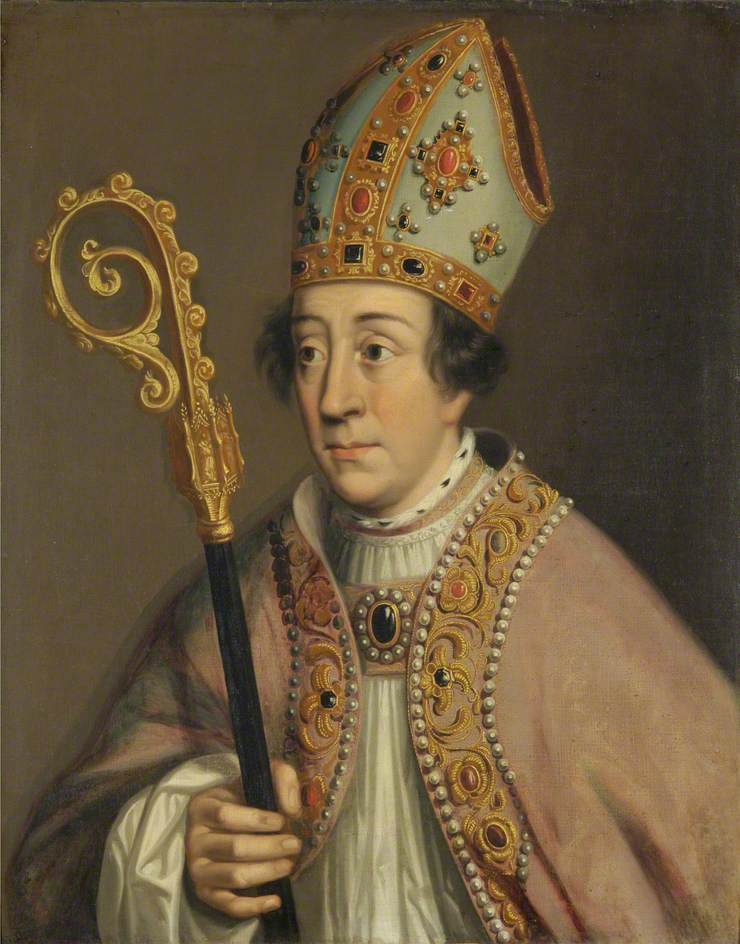
- Church: Roman Catholic
- Diocese: Aberdeen
- In office: 1518–1532
- Predecessor: Alexander Gordon
- Successor: William Stewart
- Previous posts: Archdeacon of St Andrews; Dean of Moray

Orders
- Consecration: 20 February 1519

Personal details
- Died: 10 March 1532 St Andrews, Scotland
- Buried: St Machar's Cathedral

Gavin Dunbar (died 1532) was a 16th-century bishop of Aberdeen. He was the son of Sir Alexander Dunbar of Westfield, near Elgin and Elizabeth Sutherland, apparently a daughter of Alexander Sutherland, Laird of Duffus. Gavin Dunbar, Archbishop of Glasgow, was his nephew.

== Life ==
He was born in Westfield, near Elgin around 1455.

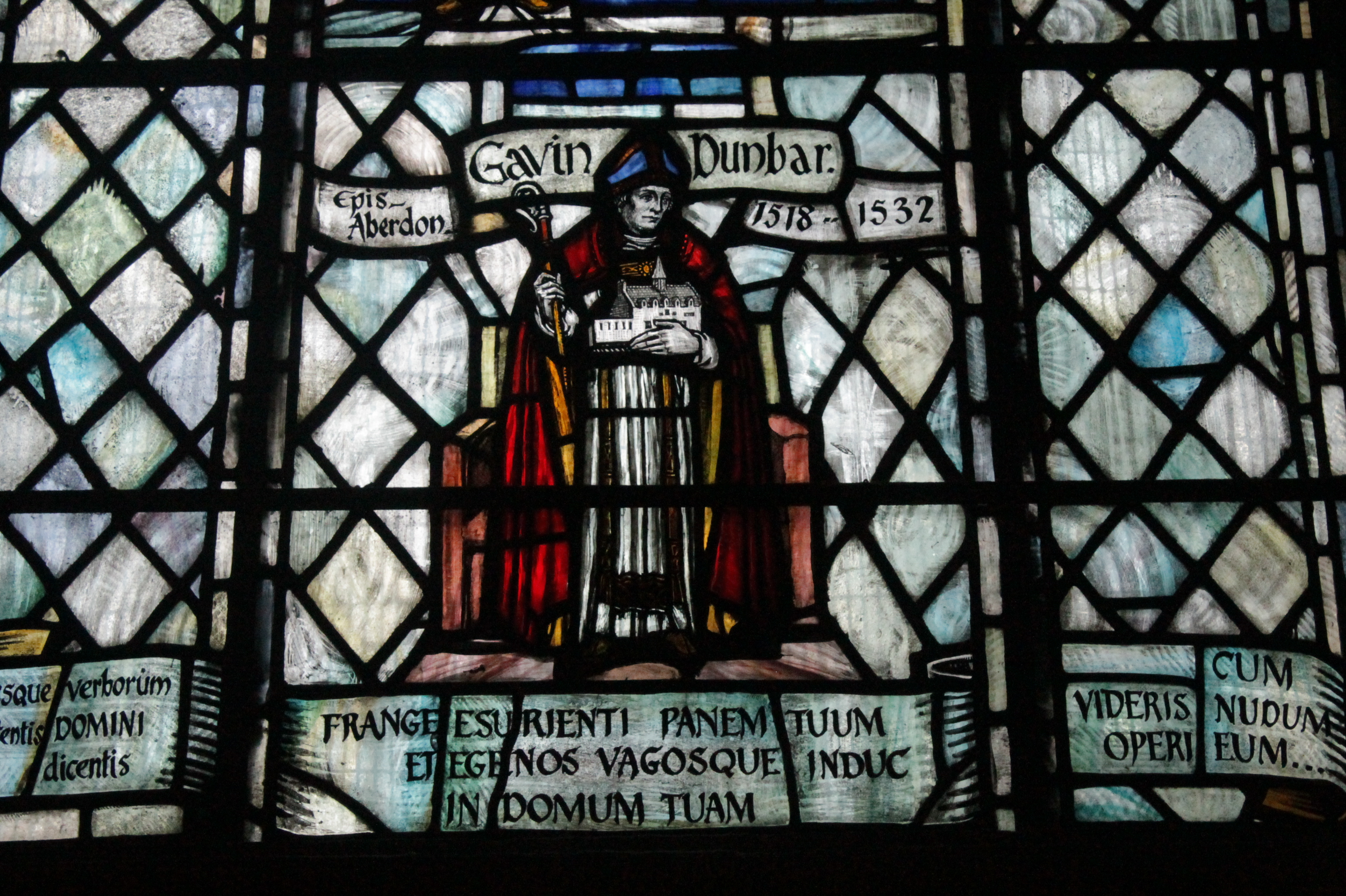
Stained glass window to Gavin Dunbar, St Machar's Cathedral

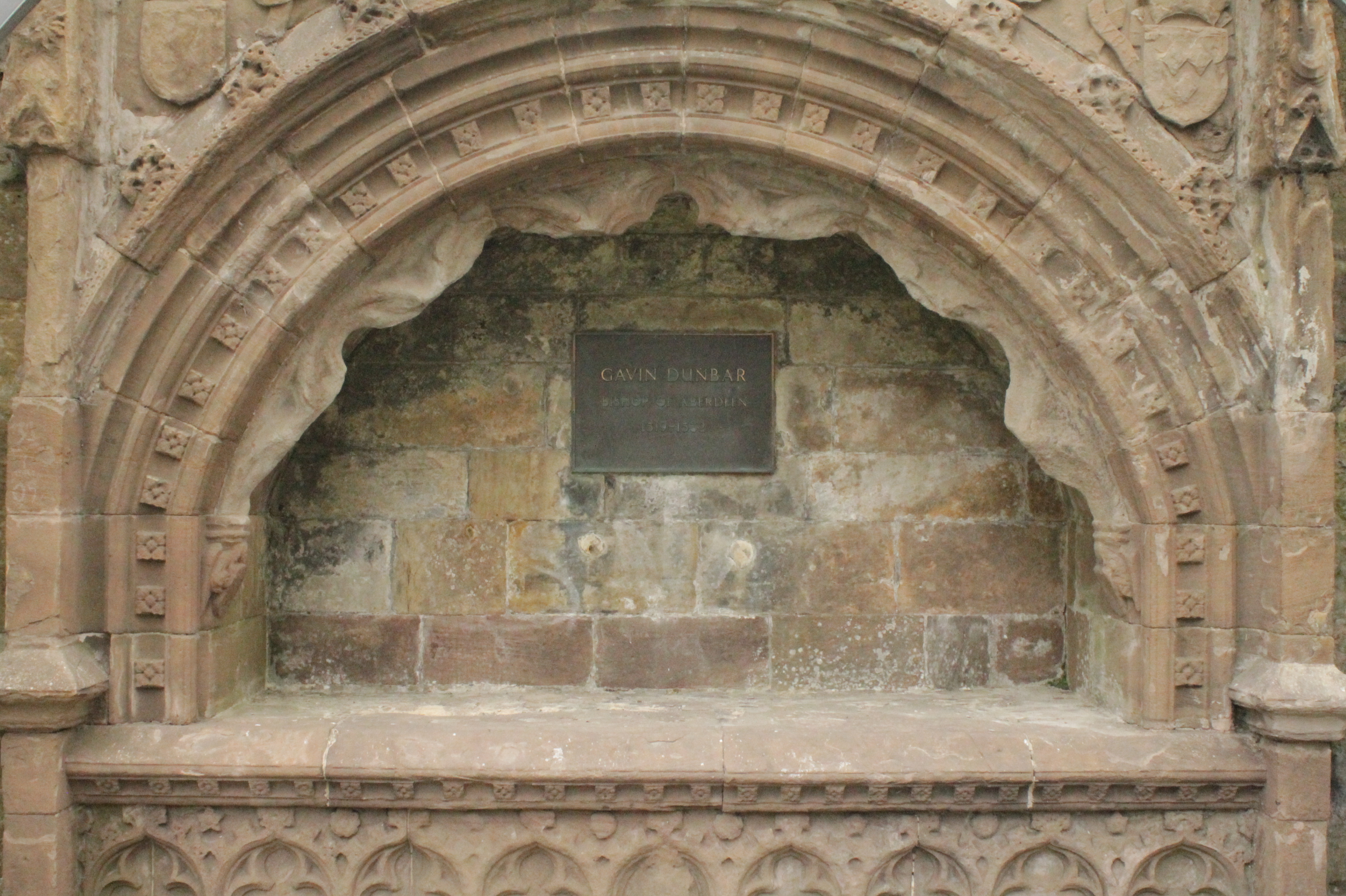
The grave of Bishop Gavin Dunbar, St Machar's Cathedral

In 1475 he received a master's degree from the University of St Andrews, and went on to become Dean of Moray by, if not before, 1487. In 1500 he was clerk of the Register, and in 1504 King James IV presented him archdeacon of the diocese of St Andrews. In 1507 Gavin was sent on a diplomatic mission to Louis XII of France with Antoine d'Arces They sailed on the Treasurer, but on his return the ship was wrecked and he was captured on the orders of Henry VII of England. He was returned to Scotland, arriving at Edinburgh by November 1508. He retained the office of Lord Clerk Register under Margaret Tudor after she became Queen Regent following the battle of Flodden in 1513. He became bishop when he was provided to the see of Aberdeen in 1518. He was consecrated the following year. He set about major rebuilding and extension of St Machar's Cathedral.

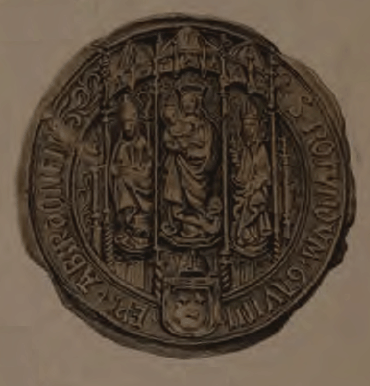
Seal of Bishop Gavin Dunbar.

Dunbar's career saw the creation of a huge number of minor ecclesiastical establishments, including two chaplaincies in Elgin Cathedral, a hospital in the Chanonry, Old Aberdeen and an altar dedicated to St Katherine in the Aberdeen Cathedral. To the cathedral, Bishop Dunbar added many structures, including the new south transept. Dunbar was famous for his wisdom and knowledge of the Arts.

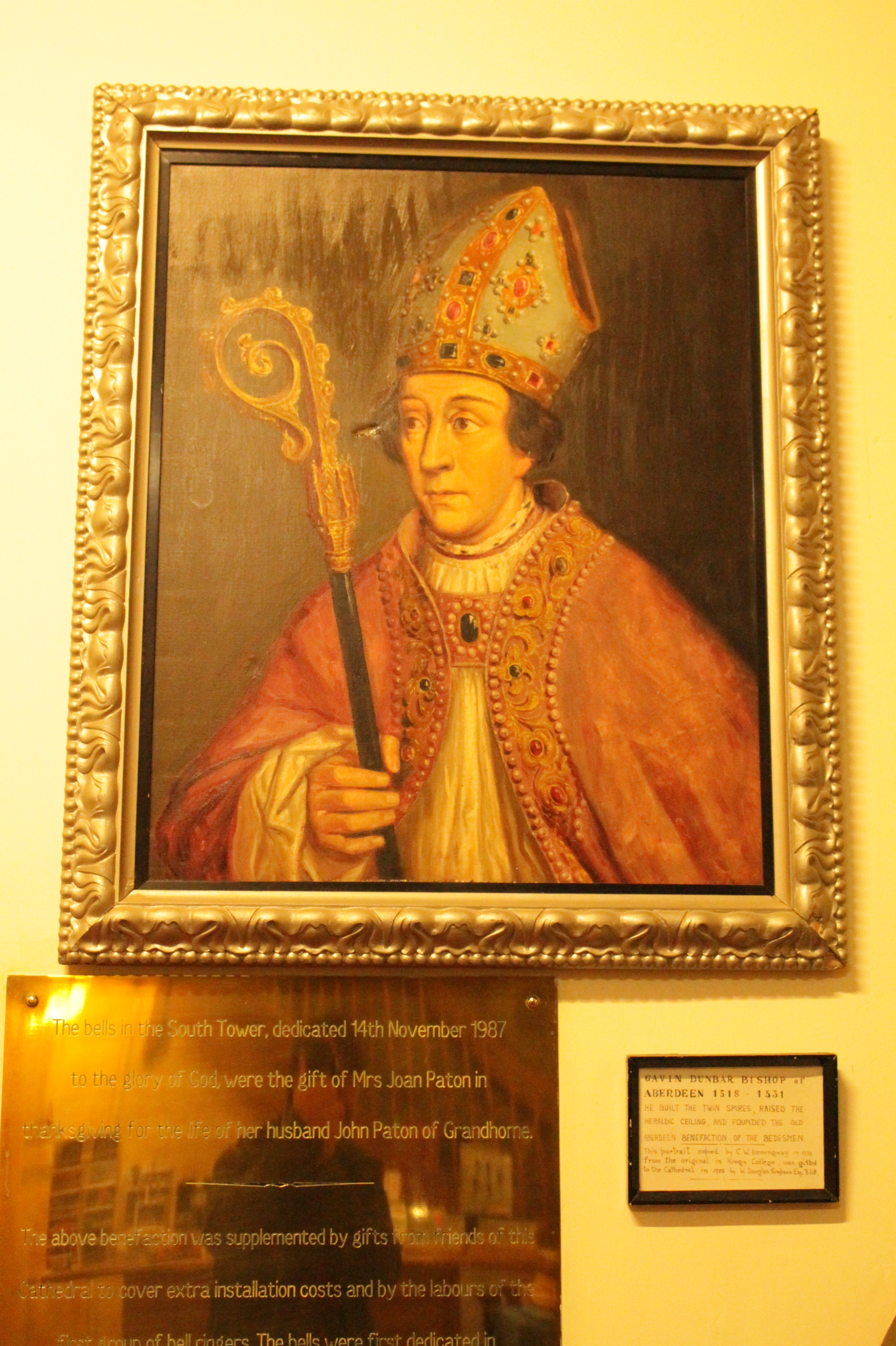
Portrait and plaque to Gavin Dunbar in St Machar's Cathedral

He died at St Andrews on 10 March 1532, and was buried in the south transept of St Machar's Cathedral in Old Aberdeen. Due to curtailment of the church the actual grave is now external, within an enclosure made of the original lower eastern walls. A partial replica has been made internally but is not the grave.

Political offices
Preceded by Gavin Douglas	Keeper of the Great Seal of Scotland; 1525–1558	Succeeded by John Lyon
Religious titles
Preceded by Alexander Gordon	Bishop of Aberdeen; 1518/9–32	Succeeded by William Stewart
