= St Peter's Roman Catholic Church, Buckie =

Catholic church in Buckie, Scotland

Coordinates: 57.6737°N 2.9757°W

St Peter's Roman Catholic Church
- The Buckie Cathedral
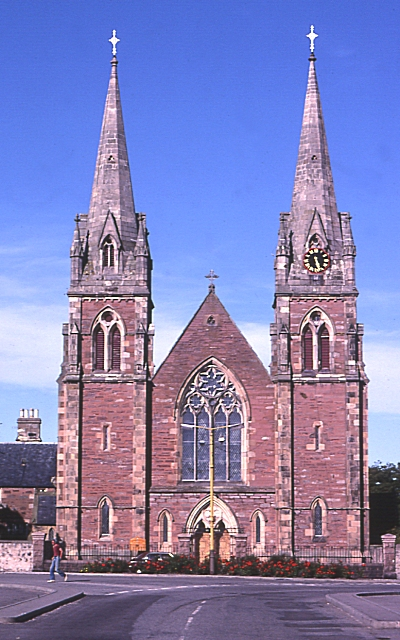
- West elevation

- Location within Moray
- Location: Buckie
- Country: Scotland
- Denomination: Roman Catholic
- Website: www.stpeters-pa.org.uk/pa/st-peters-buckie/

History
- Founded: 1857

Architecture
- Functional status: Active
- Heritage designation: Category A listed building

Administration
- Archdiocese: St Andrews and Edinburgh
- Diocese: Aberdeen

St Peter's Roman Catholic Church is a large mid-nineteenth century church in Buckie, Moray, Scotland. Known locally as the Buckie Cathedral, it was built between 1851 and 1857, soon after the emancipation of Catholics in Scotland, to provide a place of worship for the local Catholic congregation. It was designed by James Kyle, Catholic bishop of Aberdeen, and built on land donated to the diocese by Sir William Gordon, Baronet of Letterfourie. It was extended and redecorated in the early twentieth century by Charles Ménart, and was designated a Category A listed building in 1972. It remains an active place of worship, under the governance of the Roman Catholic Diocese of Aberdeen.

== Description ==
St Peter's is a large church, built in 13th century Gothic style. Its prominent location and girth allow it to be seen from several miles away, and despite its status as a local parish church, it is known locally as the Buckie Cathedral. The church presents an imposing Gothic west frontage, which has been compared with St Patrick's Cathedral in Armagh. Twin squared towers flank the gabled centre and its main entrance, which is recessed within a point-headed arch beneath a four-light stained glass window with geometric tracery. The five-bay aisled nave is lit by triple lancet windows, and at the east end is a lower, rectangular chancel, incorporating a rose window, 13 feet (4 m) in diameter, in its gable end.

=== Interior ===
The interior of the church is richly decorated in a Gothic style. Its tall, narrow nave has arcaded aisles to either side, with thick columns supporting their pointed arches. At the west end is a corbelled gallery containing a large pipe organ, below which is an elaborate war memorial, commemorating soldiers killed in the First World War, and along the walls of the aisles are images of the Stations of the Cross in large, decorative wooden frames. The church's font, with its heavy stone base and elaborately carved wooden cover, is in a small baptistry in the south-west corner.

The church's main focus is its chancel, which has ornately carved reredos of Caen stone and polished Languedoc marble, and a pulpit, altar and communion rail, all intricately designed in various kinds of marble.

=== Presbytery and enclosing walls ===
The presbytery is attached to the church at the north east corner. It is a two-storey, red sandstone house, with tooled ashlar detailing and a slate roof. The church and presbytery are surrounded by a high coped rubble wall, lowered at the west front with spearhead railings and a carriage gate.

== History ==
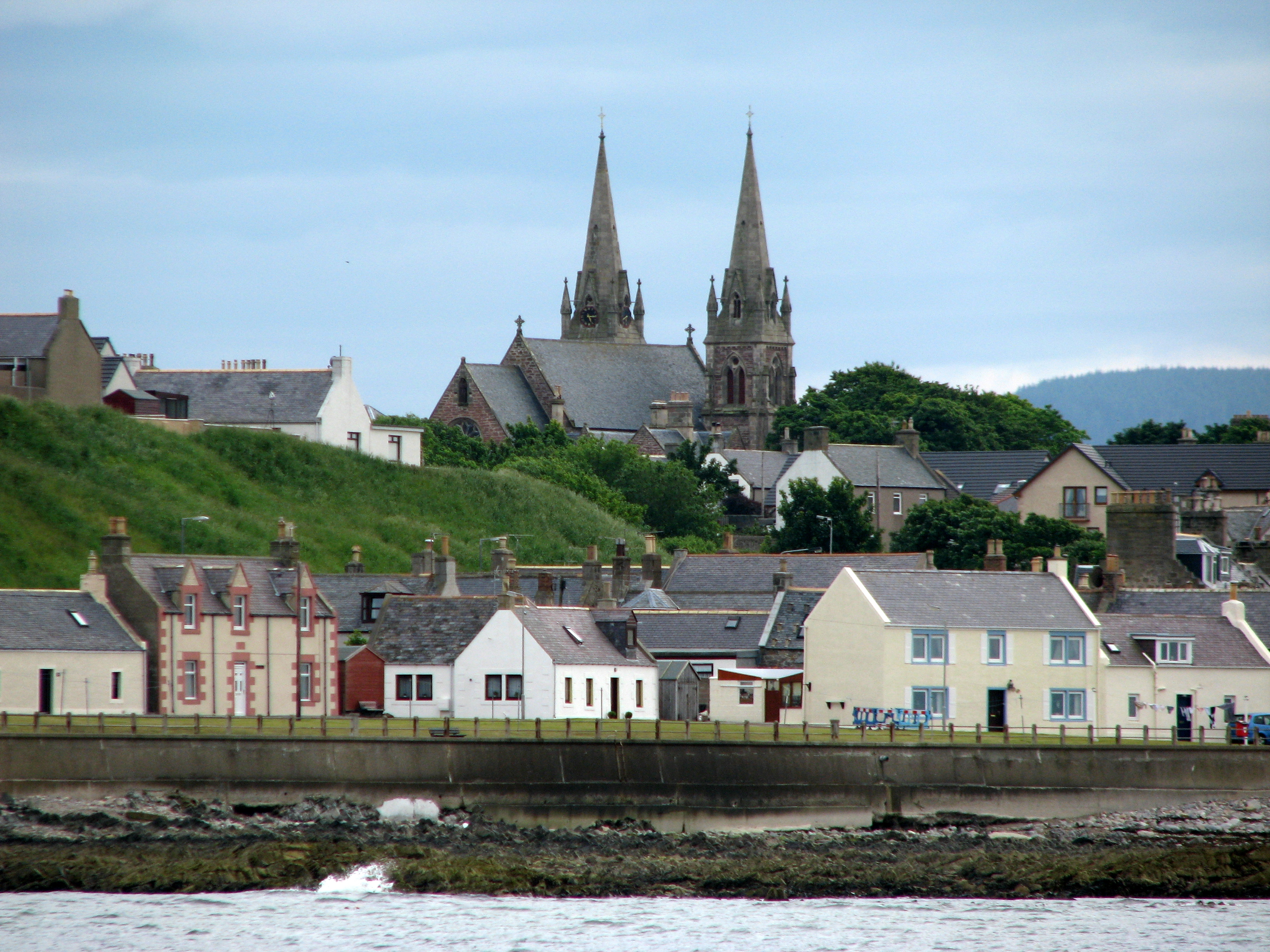
St Peter's, Buckie, as seen from offshore between Cluny and Buckpool harbours

In 1850, the Catholic bishop of Aberdeen James Kyle, eager to build a church to accommodate the growing Catholic congregation in Buckie, asked Sir William Gordon, the Baronet of Letterfourie and a prominent local Catholic, to donate land within the town on which to build a new church. An agreement was reached whereby Gordon would provide a plot of land sufficient for the church, a house for the priest and a school, and Gordon and his brother would be interred within the church upon their deaths.

With the land secured, construction of the building started in 1851, according to designs drawn up by Kyle himself, with assistance from A & W Reid, an architectural firm from Elgin. The imposing west front of the building was based on the derelict Elgin Cathedral, and was intended to symbolise the respectability attained by Catholics following their recent emancipation in Scotland. The building was completed in 1857, heralded by the following announcement carried in the local Banffshire Journal:

"Opening of New Catholic Cathedral". The new Catholic Cathedral at Buckie was opened by the Rt Rev Bishop Kyle assisted by Rev Wm Clapperton who was the first missionary therein.

From 1906 to 1907, the building was extended by the Belgian architect Charles Ménart, with the addition of a chancel to the east end of the church, which preserved and reused the rose window from the original east gable. Ménart also added a small porch to the north west of the church, the baptistry to the south west, and the Italian marble high altar and surrounding murals, which were his own design. The ornate marble war memorial at the west end of the church, installed in 1922, was designed by Cameron McDonald and carved by Nicol Bros of Buckie.

In 1972, the church was designated a Category A listed building. The church's organ was installed in 2000–2001. Made by Bryceson Bros in 1875 for Fort Augustus Abbey, it was rebuilt in St Peter's by Rushwood and Dreaper following the closure of the abbey.

== Current usage ==
The church remains in use as a Catholic church, operated as part of the Parishes of Buckie, Fochabers, Tynet and Presholme, under the governance of the Roman Catholic Diocese of Aberdeen.
