= Princess Sophie of Orléans =

French princess of the House of Orléans (1898–1928)

- Princess of Orléans
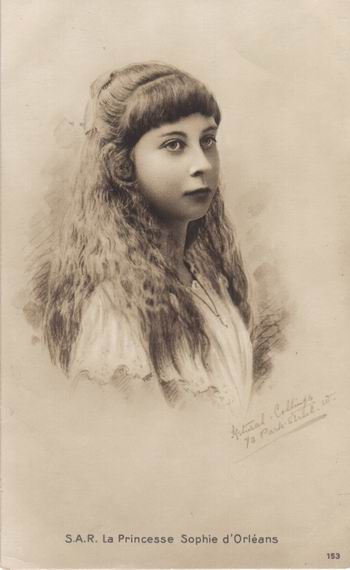
- Princess Sophie in 1906.
- Born: October 19, 1898; Neuilly-sur-Seine, France
- Died: October 9, 1928 (aged 29); Lugrin, Haute-Savoie, France
- Burial: Chapelle royale de Dreux, France
Names
- Sophie Joséphine Louise Marie Immaculata Gabrielle Philippine Henriette
- House: House of Orléans
- Father: Prince Emmanuel, Duke of Vendôme
- Mother: Princess Henriette of Belgium

Princess Sophie of Orléans (19 October 1898 – 9 October 1928) was a French aristocrat and member of the House of Orléans.

== Early life ==
Born at Neuilly-sur-Seine, Sophie was the second daughter of Prince Emmanuel, Duke of Vendôme and Princess Henriette of Belgium. Her upbringing reflected the dual nature of her lineage, alternating between the sophisticated cultural life of France and the Belgian royal court, where she remained close to her maternal relatives. Her education, conducted under the supervision of private tutors, emphasized a traditional curriculum of history, linguistics, and the arts, consistent with the dynastic expectations of a descendant of King Louis Philippe I.

== Later life and engagement rumors ==
During the early 1920s, Sophie emerged as a subject of considerable interest within the international press regarding her marital prospects. Most notably, reports in 1921 suggested a clandestine engagement or romantic association with Alexander I of Yugoslavia (then Crown Prince of Serbia). However, these assertions were never formally ratified by the House of Orléans, and the potential alliance likely succumbed to the precarious political landscape of post-World War I Europe. Consequently, she remained unmarried, concentrating her later years on social obligations and family affairs within the Haute-Savoie region.

== Death ==
Princess Sophie died on 9 October 1928 at the Château de Tourronde in Lugrin, near Évian-les-Bains. Following her death, she was interred in the Orléans family necropolis at the Chapelle royale de Dreux.

== Ancestry ==
Ancestors of Princess Sophie of Orléans

8. Prince Louis, Duke of Nemours
4. Prince Ferdinand, Duke of Alençon
9. Princess Victoria of Saxe-Coburg and Gotha
2. Prince Emmanuel, Duke of Vendôme
10. Duke Maximilian Joseph in Bavaria
5. Duchess Sophie Charlotte in Bavaria
11. Princess Ludovika of Bavaria
1. Princess Sophie of Orléans
12. Leopold I of Belgium
6. Prince Philippe, Count of Flanders
13. Princess Louise of Orléans
3. Princess Henriette of Belgium
14. Karl Anton, Prince of Hohenzollern
7. Princess Marie of Hohenzollern-Sigmaringen
15. Princess Josephine of Baden

== Bibliography ==
- Eilers, Marlene (1987). Queen Victoria's Descendants. Rosvall Royal Books. ISBN 978-9163059643.
- Perthes, Justus, ed. (1928). Almanach de Gotha (in French). Gotha: Justus Perthes.
