= Princess Marie Louise of Orléans (1896–1973) =

French princess

Princess Marie Louise
- Princess Philip of Bourbon-Two Sicilies; Mrs. Kingsland
- Marie Louise in 1916
- Born: 31 December 1896; Neuilly-sur-Seine, Île-de-France, France
- Died: 8 March 1973 (aged 76); New York City, U.S.
- Spouse: Prince Philip of Bourbon-Two Sicilies (m. 1916; div. 1925) Walter Frederick Kingsland Jr. (m. 1928; died 1961)
- Issue: Prince Gaetano
Names
- French: Marie Louise Ferdinande Charlotte Henriette
- House: Orléans
- Father: Prince Emmanuel of Orléans, Duke of Vendôme
- Mother: Princess Henriette of Belgium

Princess Marie Louise Ferdinande Charlotte Henriette of Orléans (31 December 1896 – 8 March 1973) was a Princess of Orléans by birth and a Princess of Bourbon-Two Sicilies through her marriage to Prince Philip of Bourbon-Two Sicilies.

== Family ==
Princess Marie Louise was born on 31 December 1896 in Neuilly-sur-Seine, Île-de-France, France. She was the eldest daughter and child of Prince Emmanuel of Orléans, Duke of Vendôme and his wife, Princess Henriette of Belgium.

Her paternal grandparents were Prince Ferdinand, Duke of Alençon and Duchess Sophie Charlotte in Bavaria and her maternal grandparents were Prince Philippe, Count of Flanders and Princess Marie of Hohenzollern-Sigmaringen. She was a great-granddaughter of Leopold I, the first king of Belgium, and a great-great-granddaughter of Louis Philippe I, the last king of France.

== Marriage and issue ==
Marie Louise married firstly to Prince Philip of Bourbon-Two Sicilies, tenth child of Prince Alfonso of Bourbon-Two Sicilies, Count of Caserta, and his wife, Princess Antonietta of Bourbon-Two Sicilies, on 12 January 1916 at her father's home in Neuilly-sur-Seine. (Note: The witnesses for the bride were her uncle, the Duc d'Orléans (represented by the Duke de Guise) and King Albert I of the Belgians (represented by Baron Guillaume, the Belgian Minister to France). For the bridegroom the witnesses were King Alfonso XIII of Spain (represented by the Infante Don Carlos de Bourbon) and Prince Javier de Bourbon of the Two Sicilies (represented by Count de La Tour en Voivre).) The couple had one child before their divorce in 1925:

- Prince Gaetano Maria Alfonso Enrico Paolo of Bourbon-Two Sicilies (1917–1984), who married Olivia Yarrow, a daughter of Lt.-Cdr. Charles A. Yarrow, on 16 February 1946, and had two sons.

Marie Louise married secondly to Walter F. Kingsland Jr. (1888-1961), a prominent New York businessman, on 12 December 1928 in Chichester, Sussex, England. His father owned a "palatial home in the Bois de Boulogne" and his grandfather was Ambrose Kingsland, the former Mayor of New York City. Marie Louise and Walter did not have children, and lived in Redding, Connecticut, for twenty years.

Marie Louise died on 8 March 1973 in New York City.

=== Descendants ===
Through her only son Prince Gaetano, she was the grandmother of two grandsons: Adrian Philip de Bourbon (b. 1948), who married Linda Idensohn on 20 March 1976, and Gregory Peter de Bourbon (b. 1950), who married, firstly, Maureen Powell on 15 May 1971. They divorced in 1986. They have two sons. He remarried to Carrie Anne Thornley on 30 August 1986.

== Gallery ==
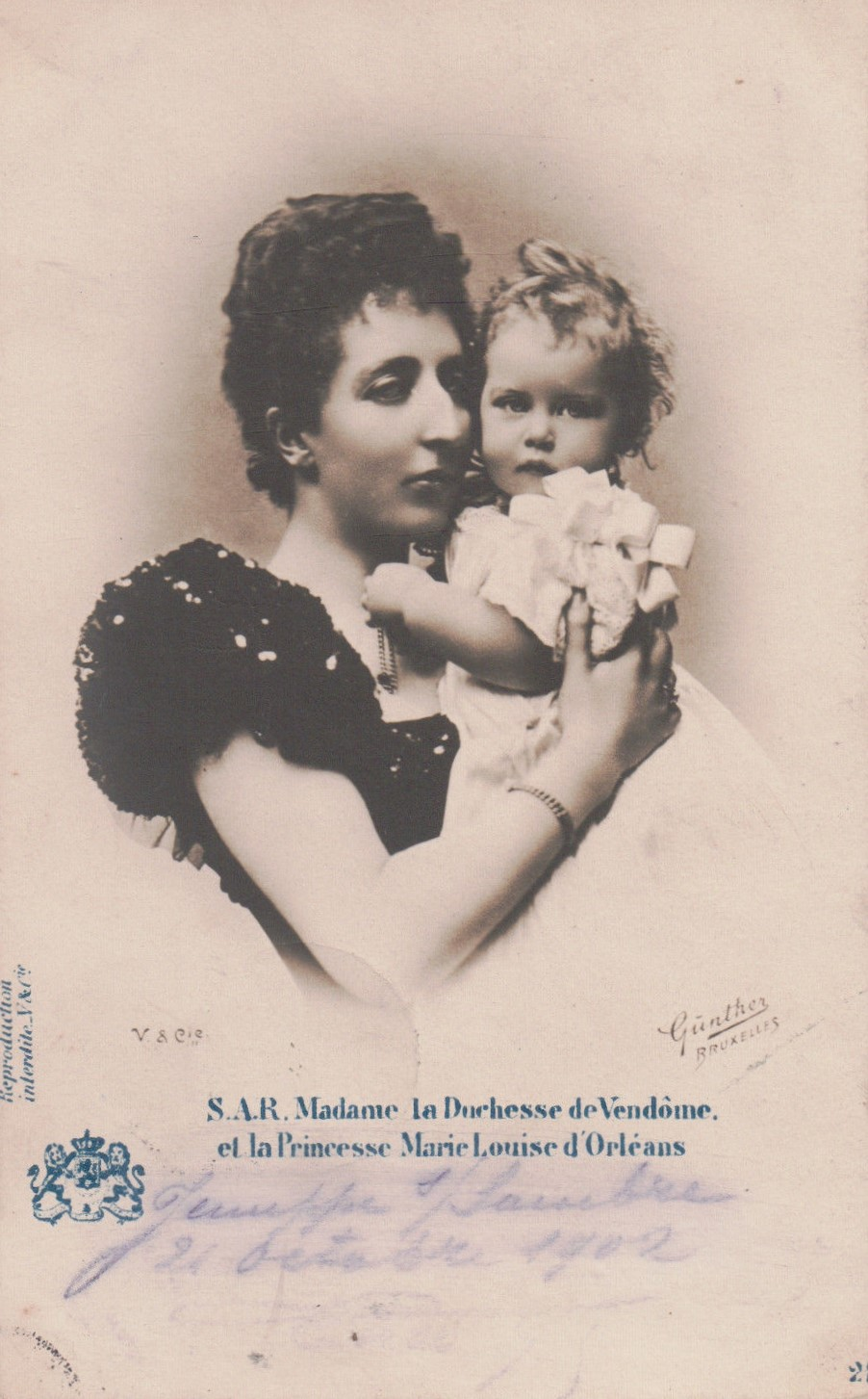
Princess Marie Louise and her mother, Princess Henriette, 1898

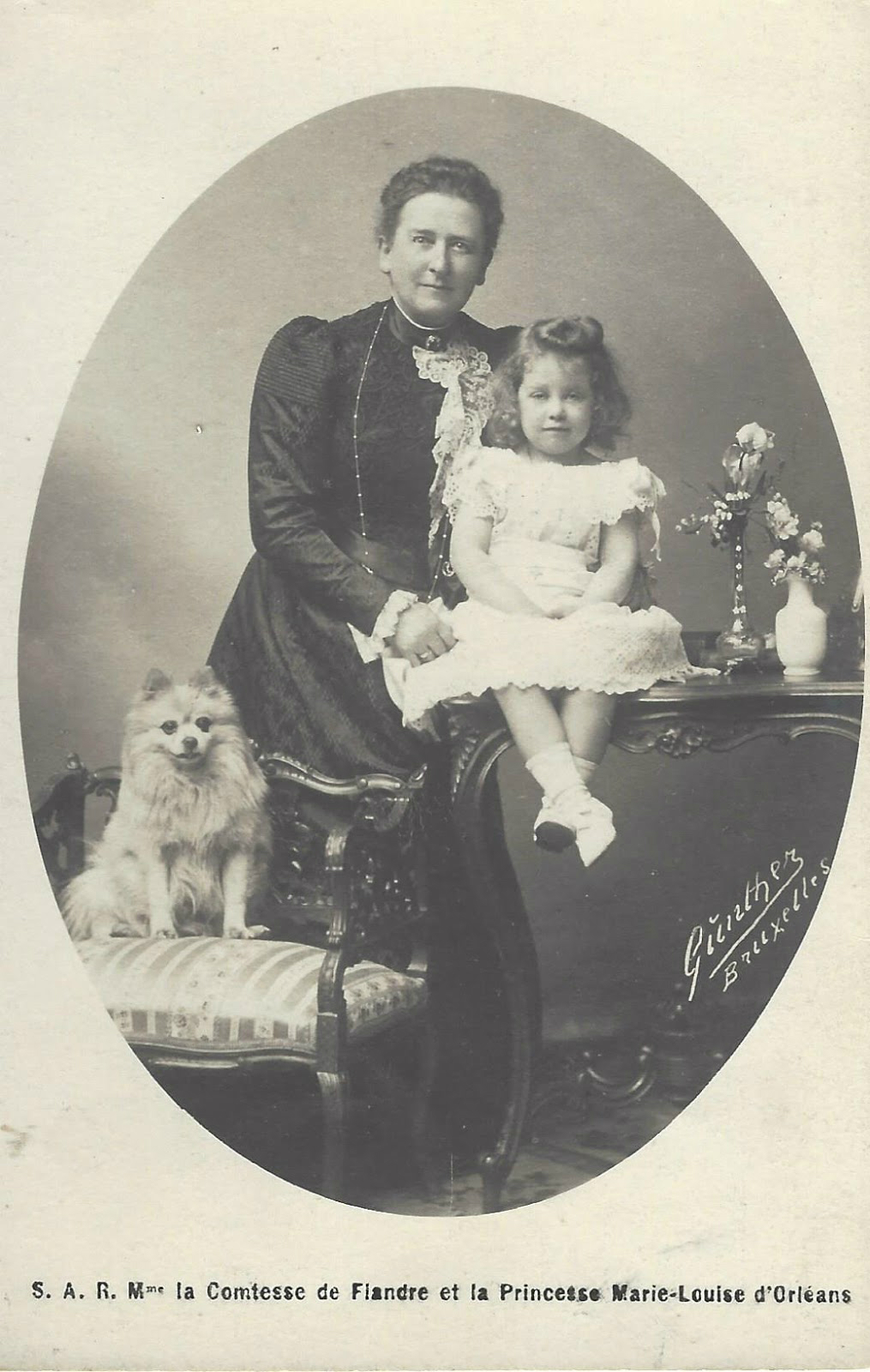
Princess Marie Louise and her grandmother, Princess Marie, c. 1900

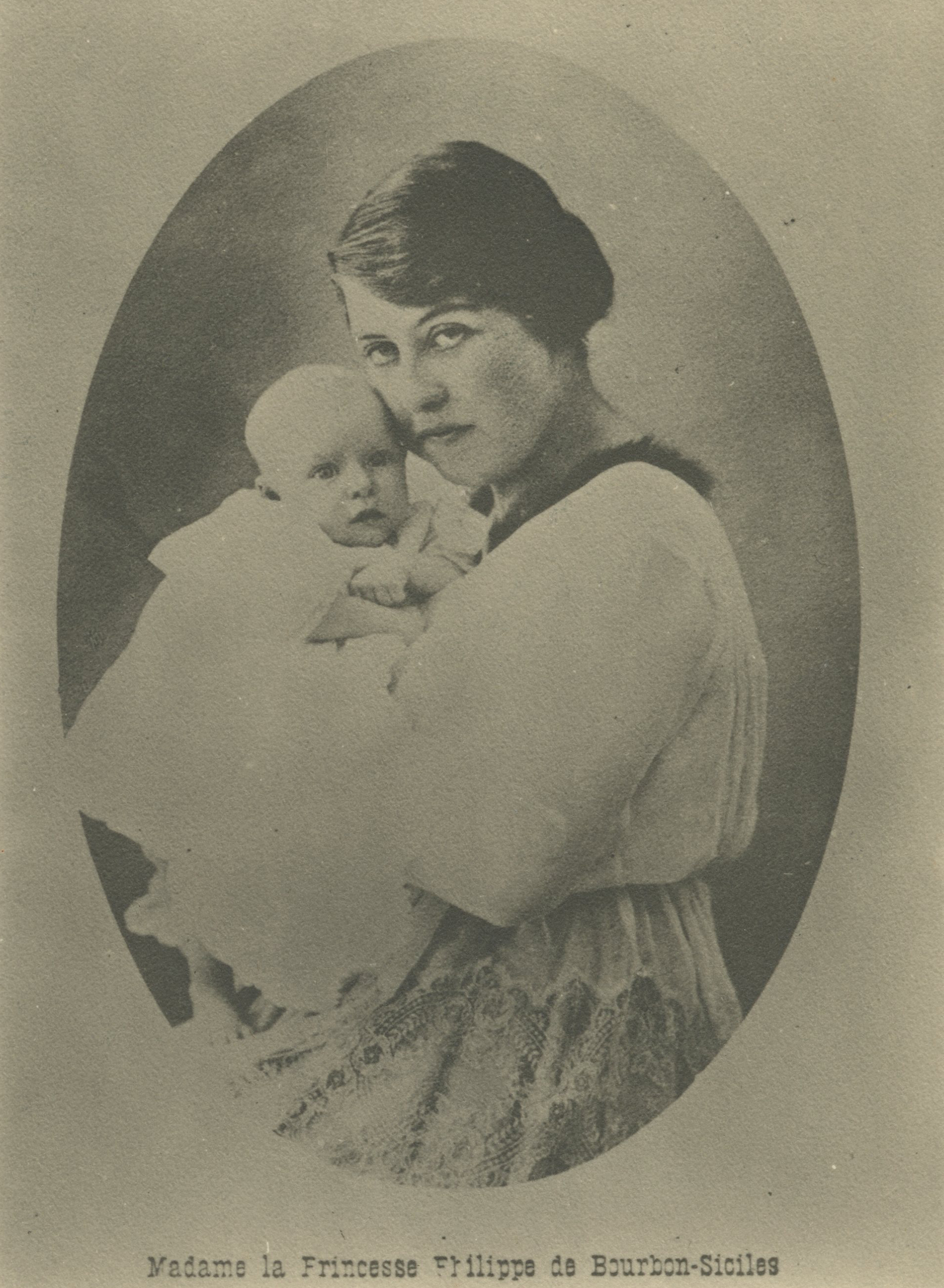
Princess Marie Louise and her son, Prince Gaetano, c. 1917

== Ancestry ==
Ancestors of Princess Marie Louise of Orléans (1896–1973)

8. Prince Louis, Duke of Nemours
4. Prince Ferdinand, Duke of Alençon
9. Princess Victoria of Saxe-Coburg and Gotha
2. Prince Emmanuel, Duke of Vendôme
10. Duke Maximilian Joseph in Bavaria
5. Duchess Sophie Charlotte in Bavaria
11. Princess Ludovika of Bavaria
1. Princess Marie Louise of Orléans
12. Leopold I of Belgium
6. Prince Philippe, Count of Flanders
13. Princess Louise of Orléans
3. Princess Henriette of Belgium
14. Karl Anton, Prince of Hohenzollern
7. Princess Marie of Hohenzollern-Sigmaringen
15. Princess Josephine of Baden
