= Prince Charles Philippe, Duke of Nemours =

French titular prince (1905–1970)

Charles-Philippe
- Duke of Nemours
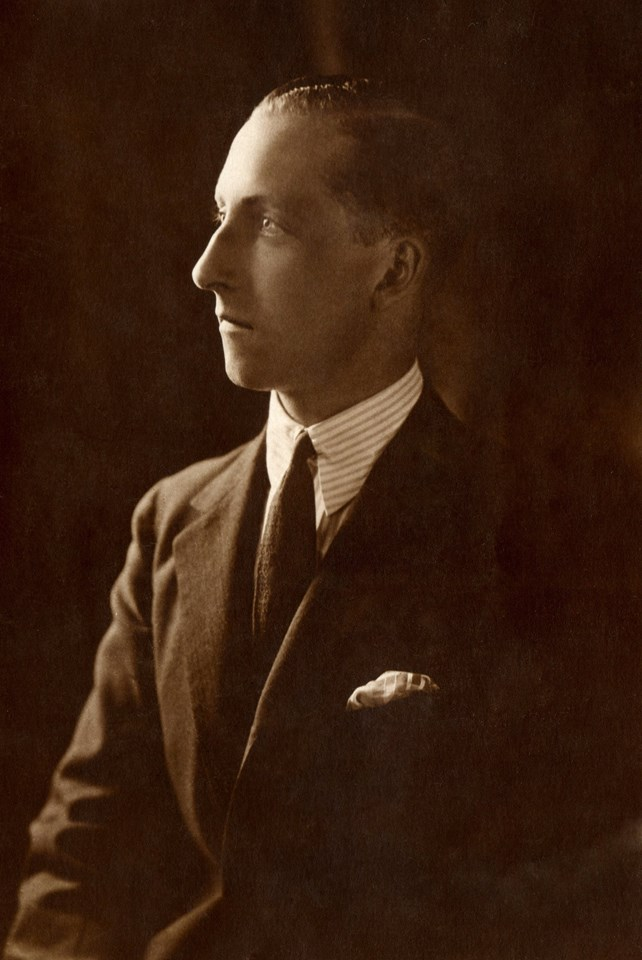
- Charles Philippe in 1929
- Born: 4 April 1905; Neuilly-sur-Seine, France
- Died: 10 March 1970 (aged 64); Neuilly-sur-Seine, France
- Burial: Chapelle royale de Dreux
- Spouse: Marguerite Watson (m. 1928)
Names
- French: Charles-Philippe Emmanuel Ferdinand Louis Gérard Joseph Marie Ghislain Baudoin Christophe Raphaél Antoine Henri d’Orléans
- House: House of Orleans
- Father: Prince Emmanuel, Duke of Vendôme
- Mother: Princess Henriette of Belgium

Charles-Philippe d'Orléans (4 April 1905 – 10 March 1970) was a member of the House of Orléans, who bore the courtesy title of Duke of Nemours. He was descended from Louis-Philippe's second son, Prince Louis, Duke of Nemours.

== Family ==
Charles-Philippe d'Orléans was the last child and only son of Emmanuel d'Orléans (1872-1931), Duke of Vendôme, and his wife Princess Henriette of Belgium (1870-1948), Duchess of Saxony. Through his mother, daughter of Prince Philippe of Belgium (1837-1905), Count of Flanders, he is affiliated to the Belgian dynasty of Saxe-Coburg and Gotha: Charles-Philippe is the great-grandson of King Leopold I and the nephew of Albert I of Belgium. On his father's side, the prince belongs to the youngest line of the House of Orléans, descended from the Duke of Nemours, considered by the Orleanists to be the branch of the princes of the blood, heir to the eldest branch in the event of extinction, according to French monarchical traditions.

On 24 September 1928, Prince Charles-Philippe d'Orléans married Marguerite Watson (1899-1993), an American whom he had met during a trip to the United States; from their union, which was not recognized by the Duc de Guise (then the Orleanist pretender to the throne of France and head of the family), no children were born.

== Biography ==
Charles-Philippe d'Orléans was born on 4 April 1905 at the family home, a private mansion on the rue Borghèse in Neuilly-sur-Seine; he was nicknamed "Chappy" in the family context. Prince Charles-Philippe was educated as a child by a tutor who was at one time coveted by the Duchess of Guise for the Count of Paris.

He was Grand Master of the Order of Saint Lazarus from 1967 to 1969, with Prince Michel d'Orléans (born in 1940) as coadjutor.

In 1967, Prince Charles-Philippe was the only member of the Orléans family to attend the wedding of Prince Michel d'Orléans with Béatrice Pasquier de Franclieu. The Count of Paris, Prince Michel's father, disapproved of this union and had forbidden members of his family to attend. To thank him for this support, Prince Michel asked the Duke of Nemours to be the godfather of his first child, Princess Clotilde (born on 28 December 1968, in Casablanca), and named his first son Charles-Philippe.

The Duke of Nemours wanted his title to pass to Prince Michel after his death. However, on 10 December 1976, six years after the death of Prince Charles-Philippe, Prince Michel would be named Count of Évreux by his father, the Count of Paris.

== Titles ==
The titles worn by the members of the House of Orleans born after the end of the July Monarchy have no legal existence in France and are considered as courtesy titles. They are attributed by the eldest of the Orleans, the Orleanist pretender to the throne of France:

- 4 April 1905 – 10 March 1970: His Royal Highness the Duke of Nemours

Son of the Duke of Vendôme, Charles-Philippe received at his birth from the head of the family, the Duke of Orleans, the titles of Prince of Orleans and Duke of Nemours, as well as the predicate of royal highness as a member of the house of Orleans.

Charles-Philippe d'Orleans was also, since 1926, a prince of the royal blood of France since he belongs to the first cadet branch of the House of Orleans. On the death of his father, the Duke of Vendôme, on 1 February 1931, the Prince became the eldest of the younger branch of the royal house of France and the first prince of the royal blood of France.

== Ancestry ==
Ancestors of Prince Charles Philippe, Duke of Nemours

8. Prince Louis, Duke of Nemours
4. Prince Ferdinand, Duke of Alençon
9. Princess Victoria of Saxe-Coburg and Gotha
2. Prince Emmanuel, Duke of Vendôme
10. Duke Maximilian Joseph in Bavaria
5. Duchess Sophie Charlotte in Bavaria
11. Princess Ludovika of Bavaria
1. Prince Charles Philippe, Duke of Nemours
12. Leopold I of Belgium
6. Prince Philippe, Count of Flanders
13. Princess Louise of Orléans
3. Princess Henriette of Belgium
14. Karl Anton, Prince of Hohenzollern
7. Princess Marie of Hohenzollern-Sigmaringen
15. Princess Josephine of Baden
