= Prince Baudouin of Belgium =

Belgian prince (1869–1891)

Prince Baudouin
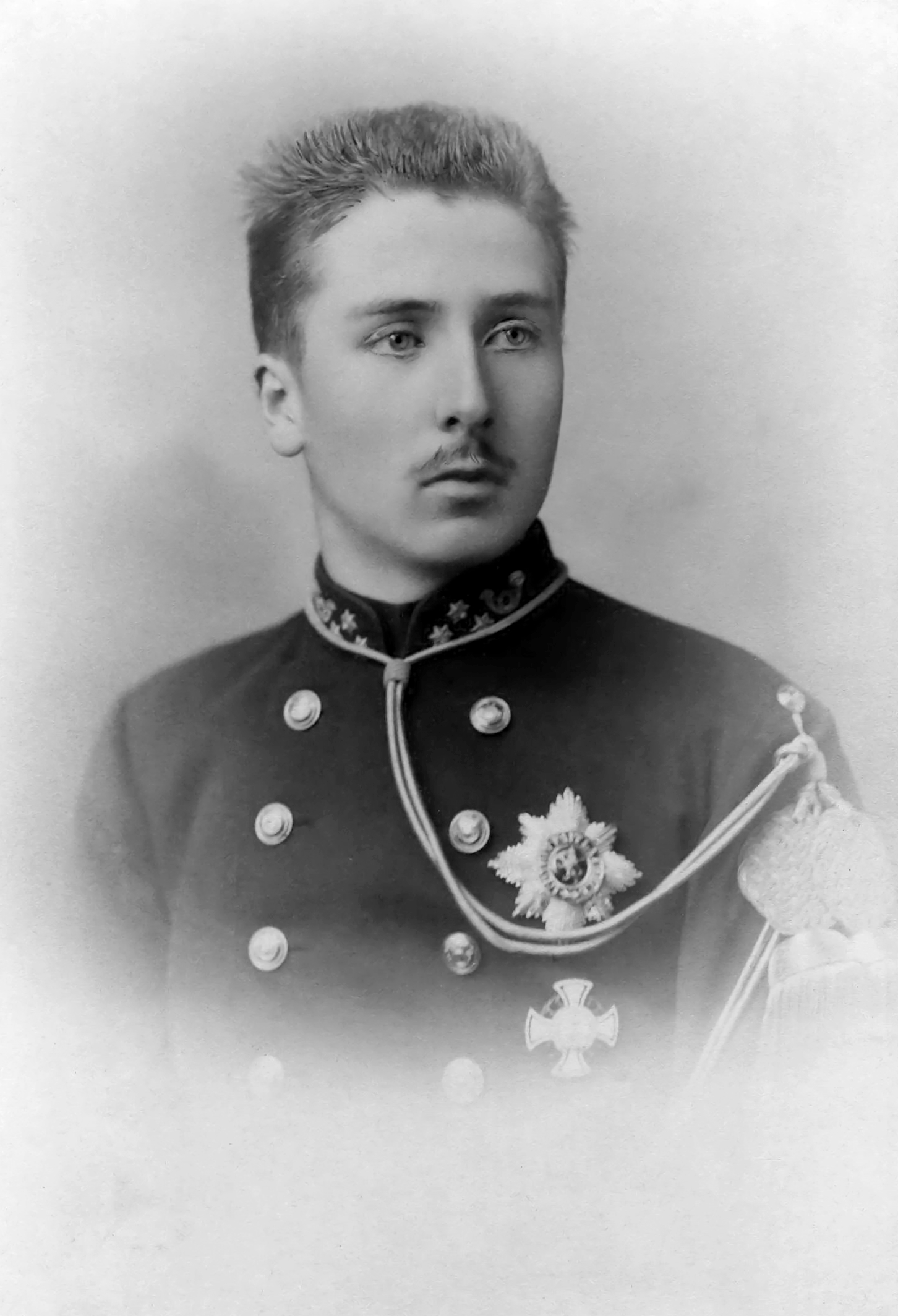
- Baudouin in 1889
- Born: 3 June 1869; Brussels, Belgium
- Died: 23 January 1891 (aged 21); Brussels, Belgium
- Burial: Church of Our Lady of Laeken
Names
- French: Baudouin Léopold Philippe Marie Charles Antoine Joseph Louis; Dutch: Boudewijn Leopold Filips Marie Karel Antoon Jozef Lodewijk; German: Balduin Leopold Philipp Maria Karl Antonius Joseph Ludwig
- House: Saxe-Coburg and Gotha
- Father: Prince Philippe, Count of Flanders
- Mother: Princess Marie of Hohenzollern-Sigmaringen

Prince Baudouin of Belgium (3 June 1869 – 23 January 1891) was the first child and eldest son of Prince Philippe, Count of Flanders, and his wife, Princess Marie of Hohenzollern-Sigmaringen. After Baudouin's death, his younger brother eventually became heir presumptive after the death of their father, and later succeeded their uncle Leopold II as Albert I of Belgium.

== Biography ==
Baudouin was the nephew of Leopold II of Belgium. Leopold II's only son, Leopold, Duke of Brabant, died five months before Baudouin's birth. This death left the king's younger brother, Prince Philippe, Count of Flanders, as the only person in line for the Belgian throne. Baudouin's birth in June 1869 was celebrated throughout the country. He was second in line to the throne at the time of his birth, after his father. Leopold was to have one more child, another daughter, Clémentine. Baudouin was thus groomed to eventually succeed to the throne.

Prince Baudouin became popular with Flemings, the Dutch-speaking people of the Flanders region. Unlike King Leopold, who generally spoke only in French, in 1887 Baudouin addressed a large crowd in perfect Dutch and was thereafter hailed by the Flemish Movement as "our Flemish prince".

== Death ==
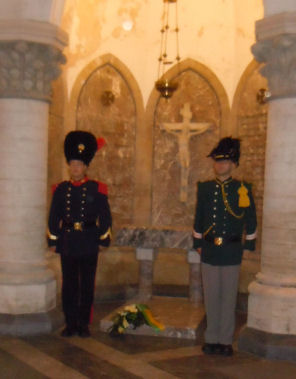
Grave of Prince Baudouin with guard of honour

Baudouin died of influenza in the Palace of the Count of Flanders on 23 January 1891, a day after the anniversary of his cousin Leopold's death from pneumonia. Baudouin had been visiting his sick sister, Henriette, insistent that he not be made to leave. Rumours circulated after his death that foul play had been involved, including a suggestion that Baudouin's death was a copy of the suicide of Crown Prince Rudolf of Austria; Rudolf was the husband of Baudouin's cousin, Stéphanie. Baudouin was, at the time of his death, soon to be betrothed to his cousin, Clémentine.

Upon the death, the Belgian Parliament was adjourned and theatres and public institutions were closed until after the funeral. Baudouin's body was interred at the royal vault at the Church of Our Lady of Laeken in Brussels.

== Honours ==
- Grand Cordon in the Order of Leopold.

== Ancestry ==
Ancestors of Prince Baudouin of Belgium

8. Francis, Duke of Saxe-Coburg-Saalfeld
4. Leopold I of Belgium
9. Countess Augusta Reuss of Ebersdorf
2. Prince Philippe, Count of Flanders
10. Louis Philippe I of France
5. Princess Louise of Orléans
11. Princess Maria Amalia of Naples and Sicily
1. Prince Baudouin of Belgium
12. Karl, Prince of Hohenzollern-Sigmaringen
6. Karl Anton, Prince of Hohenzollern
13. Marie Antoinette Murat
3. Princess Marie of Hohenzollern-Sigmaringen
14. Charles, Grand Duke of Baden
7. Princess Josephine of Baden
15. Stéphanie de Beauharnais

== Bibliography ==
- Bilteryst Damien, Le prince Baudouin, frère du Roi-Chevalier, Bruxelles, Editions Racine, 2013, 336 p. ISBN 9782873868475
