= Prince Emmanuel, Duke of Vendôme =

Prince Emmanuel
- Duke of Vendôme
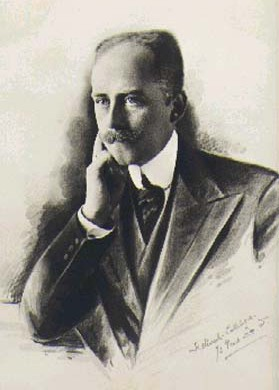
- Born: 18 January 1872; Meran, Austria-Hungary
- Died: 1 February 1931 (aged 59); Cannes, French Third Republic
- Burial: Chapelle royale de Dreux
- Spouse: Princess Henriette of Belgium (m. 1896)
- Issue: Marie Louise, Princess Philip of Bourbon Two-Sicilies; Princess Sophie; Princess Geneviève; Prince Charles Philippe, Duke of Nemours
- House: Orléans
- Father: Prince Ferdinand, Duke of Alençon
- Mother: Duchess Sophie Charlotte in Bavaria

Prince Emmanuel of Orléans, Duke of Vendôme (Philippe Emmanuel Maximilien Marie Eudes; 18 January 1872 – 1 February 1931) was a French royal from the House of Orléans.

== Early life ==
Emmanuel was born in Obermais, Meran on 18 January 1872. He was the second child and only son of Ferdinand Philippe d'Orléans, Duke of Alençon and his wife Duchess Sophie Charlotte in Bavaria. His mother was the famed duchesse d'Alençon who died in a fire at a charity bazaar in Paris on 4 May 1897. His older sister, Louise d'Orléans, married Prince Alfons of Bavaria.

His paternal grandparents were Prince Louis, Duke of Nemours (son of Queen Maria and King Louis Philippe, who was forced to abdicate after the outbreak of the French Revolution of 1848) and Princess Victoria of Saxe-Coburg and Gotha (a first cousin of Queen Victoria). His maternal grandparents were Duke Maximilian Joseph in Bavaria and Princess Ludovika of Bavaria.

== Career ==
The Duke was a Major in the Austro-Hungarian Army, however, he was not allowed to serve in World War I due to an 1886 law barring all princes of the two former sovereign houses of France from being permitted serving their country in the army or navy or hold office in the French government. The Prince, undeterred, volunteered with the French Red Cross, was appointed a principal delegate on the Belgian front and served as a director of the Franco-Belgian Hospital in Calais.

In 1926, he led an excavation party that unearthed the village of Roquebillière, in the Alpes-Maritimes department, where several Roman tombs were found containing rare jewels, vases and objets d'art.

== Personal life ==
On 12 February 1896, he married Princess Henriette of Belgium (1870–1948) in Brussels. Henriette was the daughter of Prince Philippe, Count of Flanders and Princess Marie of Hohenzollern-Sigmaringen, and the sister of King Albert I of Belgium. Together, they were known as the Sporting Duke and Duchess, and had four children:

- Princess Marie-Louise (31 December 1896 – 8 March 1973), who married Prince Philip of Bourbon-Two Sicilies (1885–1949) on 15 January 1916. Before their marriage was annulled in 1926, they had one child together.
- Princess Sophie (19 October 1898 – 9 October 1928), who died unmarried in Lugrin in 1928. In 1921, she was rumored to have been engaged to the Crown Prince and Regent of Serbia.
- Princess Geneviève (21 September 1901 – 22 August 1983), who married Antoine, Marquis de Chaponay (1893–1956) in Neuilly, France, on 2 July 1923. Antoine, a widower of Diane de Cossé Brissac (1901–1921), and Geneviève had children together.
- Prince Charles-Philippe (4 April 1905 – 10 March 1970), Duke of Nemours, who married non-dynastically Marguerite Watson (1899–1993), daughter of Garrett Fitzgerald Watson of Richmond, Virginia, in Paris on 24 September 1928, without issue.

The couple had estates in Belgium, France and Switzerland until after World War I, when their fortune diminished rapidly and they were forced to sell some properties.

Philippe died unexpectedly on 1 February 1931 from heart failure after catching a cold in Cannes, France. He is buried in the Chapelle Royale de Saint Louis, in Dreux. His widow, Henriette Marie of Belgium, died aged 77 on 28 March 1948 in Sierre, Valais, Switzerland.

== Honours ==
- Kingdom of Bavaria: Knight of the Order of Saint Hubert, 1892
- Spain: Knight of the Order of the Golden Fleece, 29 January 1914
- Monaco: Grand Cross of the Order of Saint-Charles, 19 June 1923

== Ancestry ==
Ancestors of Prince Emmanuel, Duke of Vendôme

8. Louis Philippe I of France
4. Prince Louis, Duke of Nemours
9. Princess Maria Amalia of Naples and Sicily
2. Prince Ferdinand, Duke of Alençon
10. Prince Ferdinand of Saxe-Coburg and Gotha
5. Princess Victoria of Saxe-Coburg and Gotha
11. Princess Maria Antonia Koháry of Csábrág and Szitnya
1. Prince Emmanuel, Duke of Vendôme
12. Duke Pius August in Bavaria
6. Duke Maximilian Joseph in Bavaria
13. Princess Amélie Louise of Arenberg
3. Duchess Sophie Charlotte in Bavaria
14. Maximilian I Joseph of Bavaria
7. Princess Ludovika of Bavaria
15. Princess Caroline of Baden
