= Palace of the Count of Flanders =

Palace in Brussels, Belgium

- Palais du Comte de Flandre (French); Paleis van de Graaf van Vlaanderen (Dutch)
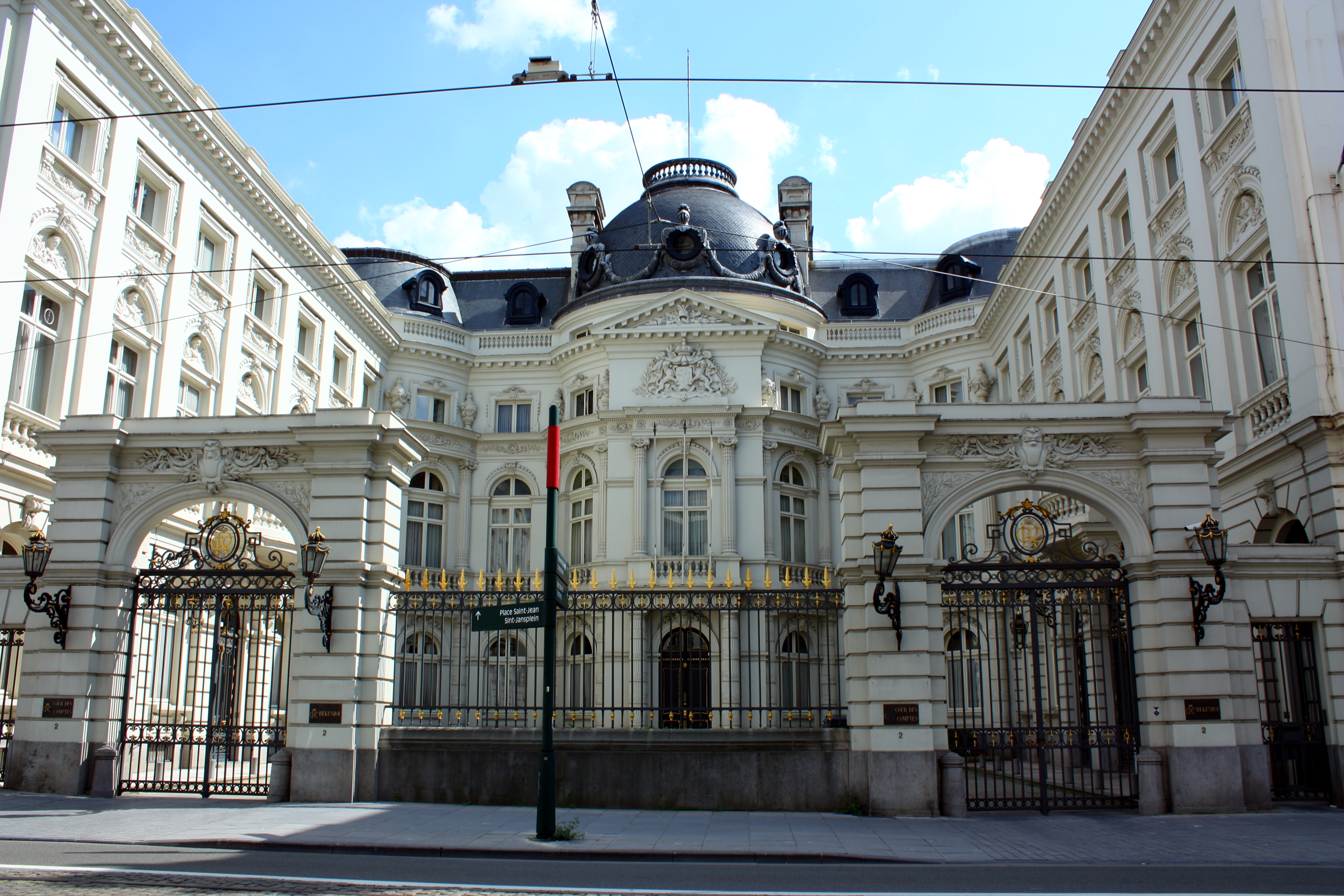
- The Palace of the Count of Flanders seen from the Rue de la Régence/Regentschapsstraat
- Interactive map of the Palace of the Count of Flanders area

General information
- Type: Palace
- Architectural style: Neoclassical
- Location: Rue de la Régence / Rekenhof 2, 1000 City of Brussels, Brussels-Capital Region, Belgium
- Coordinates: 50°50′30″N 4°21′32″E
- Current tenants: Belgian Court of Audit
- Construction started: 1776
- Inaugurated: 1781
- Client: Countess Brigitte of Tirimont-Templeuve
- Owner: Belgian state

Design and construction
- Architects: 1776–1781: Gilles-Barnabé Guimard; 1866–1899: Gustave Saintenoy, Clément Parent
- Designations: Protected (06/09/2001)

Other information
- Public transit: Brussels-Central; 1 5 Parc/Park and 2 6 Trône/Troon

The Palace of the Count of Flanders (French: Palais du Comte de Flandre; Dutch: Paleis van de Graaf van Vlaanderen) is a neoclassical palace in Brussels, Belgium. It was originally built between 1776 and 1781 for Countess Brigitte of Tirimont-Templeuve, though it was heavily expanded in the 19th century. Nowadays, it houses the Court of Audit of Belgium.

The palace is situated on the Rue de la Régence/Regentschapsstraat in the Royal Quarter (eastern part of Brussels' city centre), opposite the Royal Museums of Fine Arts of Belgium, and not far from the Place Royale/Koningsplein and the Mont des Arts/Kunstberg.

== History ==
=== Early history ===
The elegant neoclassical residence was designed by the French architect Gilles-Barnabé Guimard and built between 1776 and 1781. This building was originally one of eight pavilions intended to structure the Place Royale/Koningsplein, known as the Hôtel de Templeuve, and was to serve as the private mansion of Countess Brigitte of Tirimont-Templeuve (born Scockaert de Tirimont, family of which she was the last survivor), who agreed to have her old town house demolished and rebuilt in accordance with the project of the new square.

After the Countess' death, her son-in-law, Marquis Paul Arconati-Visconti, the City of Brussels' then-mayor, came into possession of the building, before his nephew, Marquis Joseph Arconati, inherited it in turn. Joseph Arconati sold the palace in 1834 to the city, who put it to various uses. From 1834 to 1839, it housed the Ministry of War, then the politician Charles-Ghislain Vilain XIIII lived there, and finally the Royal Athenaeum of Brussels occupied the building from 1861 to 1865.

=== Later usage and renovation ===
The palace owes its current name to Prince Philippe, Count of Flanders, third son of King Leopold I and brother of King Leopold II, who bought the residence in 1866, and moved there in May 1868, after his marriage to Princess Marie of Hohenzollern-Sigmaringen.

The expansion of the initial building, which included seven bays facing the Place Royale (where the main entrance was located) and three facing the current Rue de la Régence/Regentschapsstraat, spanned from 1866 to 1890. According to the plans of the architects Gustave Saintenoy and Clément Parent, two perpendicular wings were added to thus form a palace on a U-shaped plan. It features a small inner garden, which leads to the cour d'honneur (main courtyard), enclosed by a gate. Saintenoy also designed the Great Ball Room, but this room was destroyed in 1921.

Following the completion of the renovations, the new Count and Countess made it their family home. It was in this palace that Prince Albert (the future King Albert I) was born on 8 April 1875, and his brother, Prince Baudouin, died there on 23 January 1891.

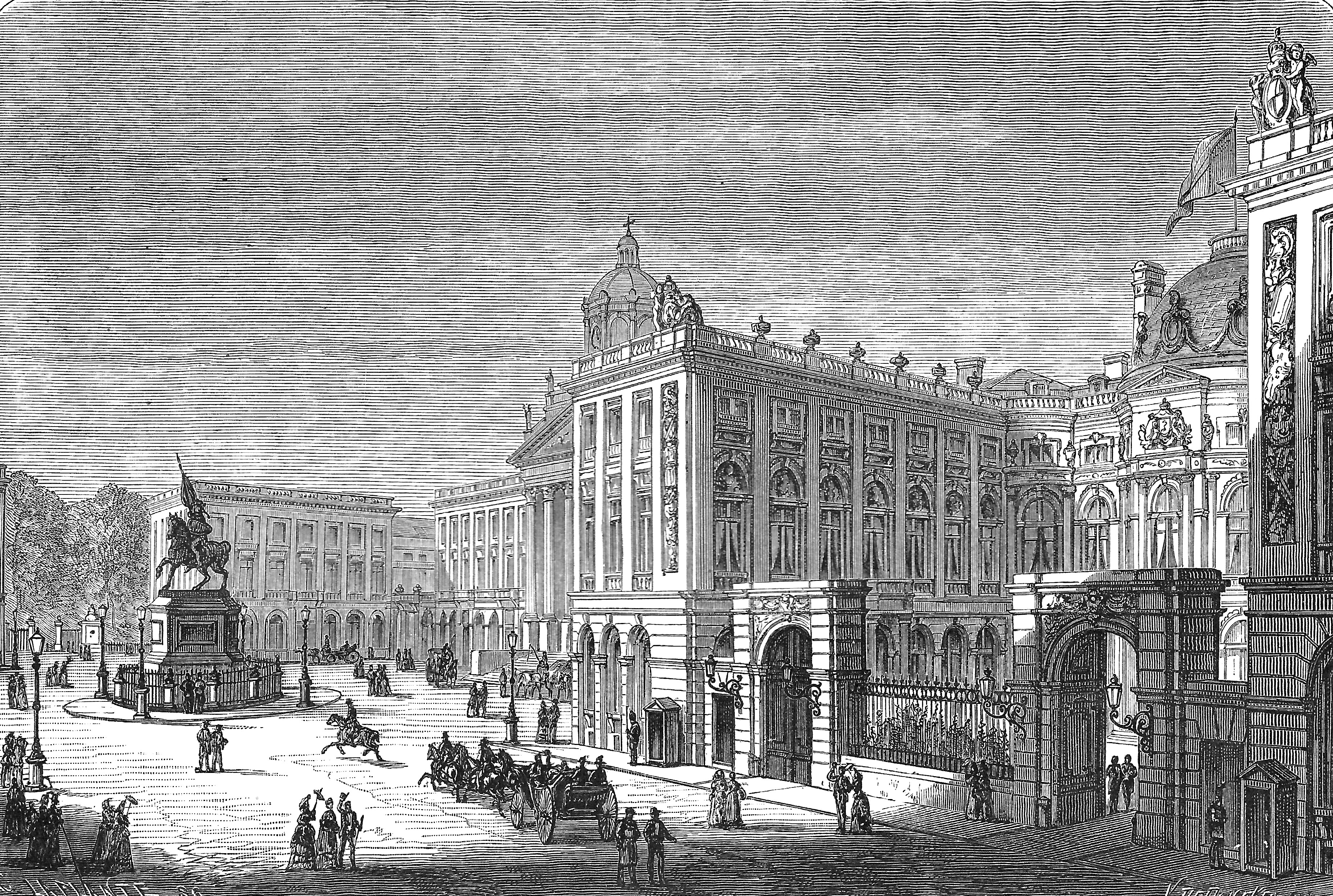
The Palace of the Count of Flanders in 1882, etching by Eugène Van Bemmel from La Belgique illustrée

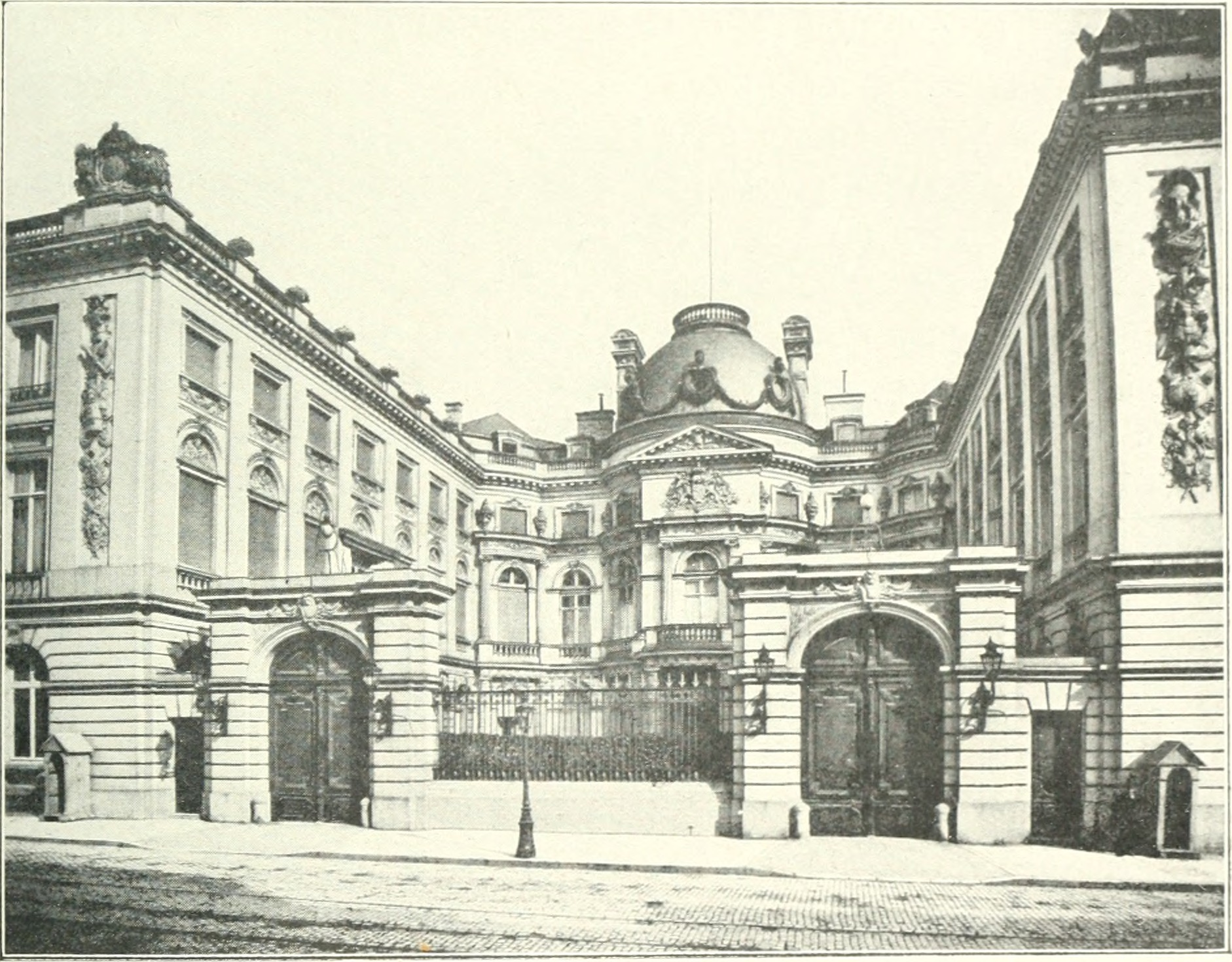
The palace at the beginning of the 20th century

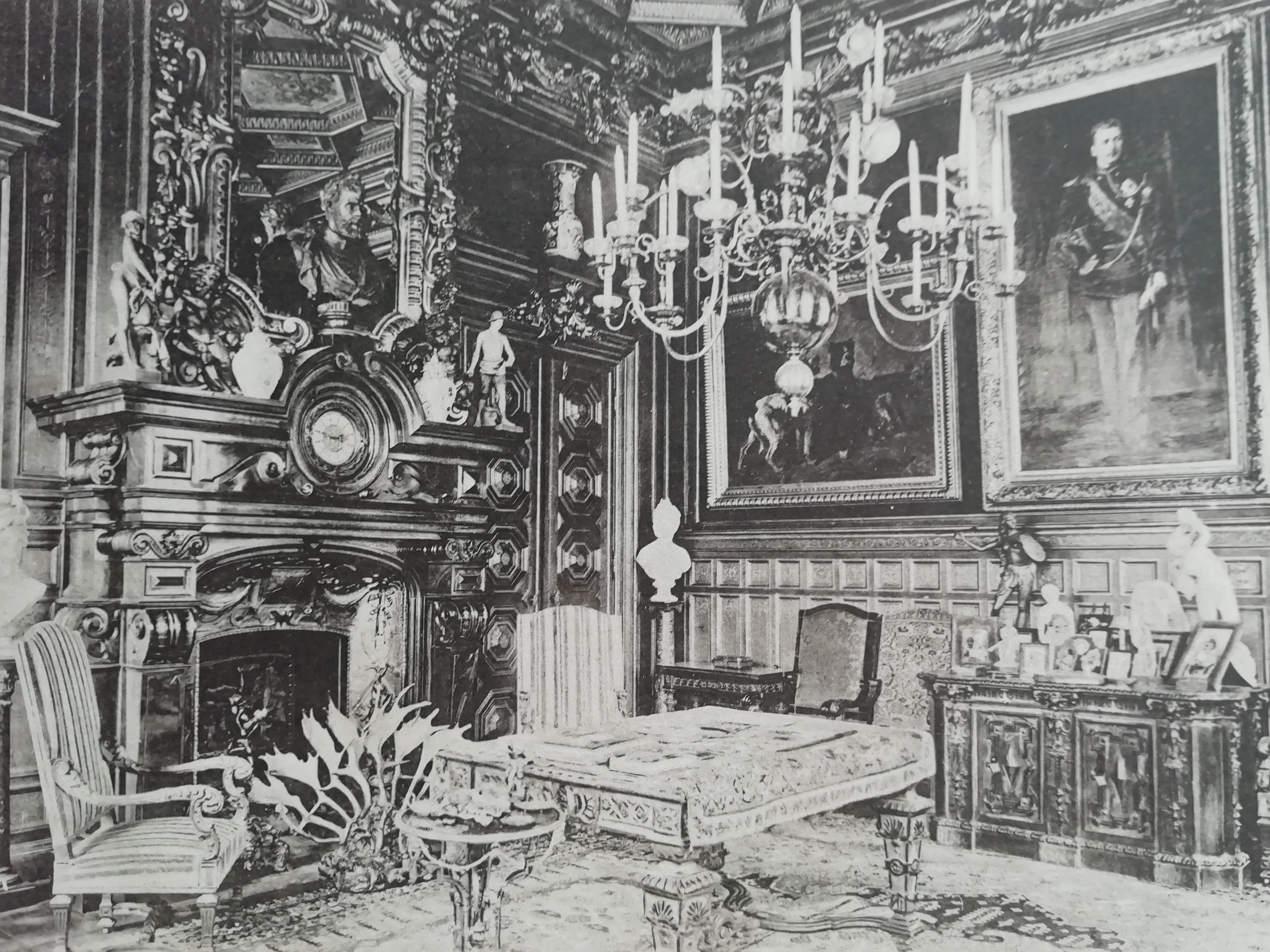
Old image of the smoking room

=== 20th and 21st centuries ===
After the Count's death in 1905, his children sold the residence to the Banque de Bruxelles, which proceeded to adapt the perpendicular wings. The wing overlooking the Place Royale was raised, while the southern wing was completely redesigned to accommodate offices and extended towards the Rue de la Régence. In 1926, the bank bought and removed the Rue de l'Arsenal/Arsenaalstraat at the back of the palace to extend its headquarters to the Rue de Namur/Naamsestraat.

Other developments were undertaken after the Second World War, notably between 1957 and 1959 with the extension of the Rue de la Régence wing. Sold in 1982 to the Belgian state, since January 1984, it has housed the headquarters of the Court of Audit of Belgium, previously located on the Place Royale.

On 6 September 2001, the palace was listed as a protected monument by the Monuments and Sites Directorate of the Brussels-Capital Region. Inside, the major rooms and interiors are kept in the state they were as a royal residence.

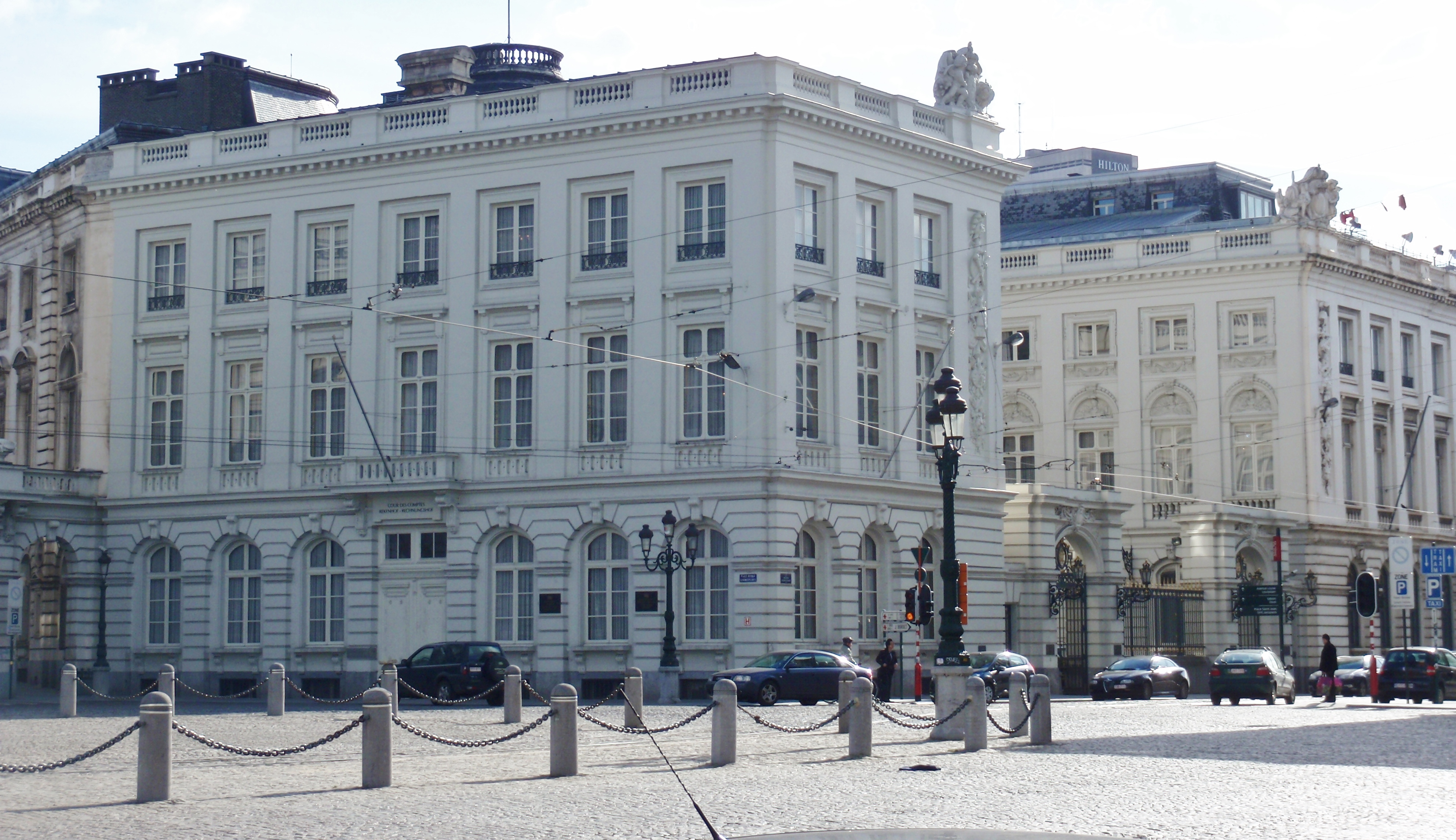
View from the Place Royale with first the 18th-century Hôtel de Templeuve and further down the street the 19th-century extension

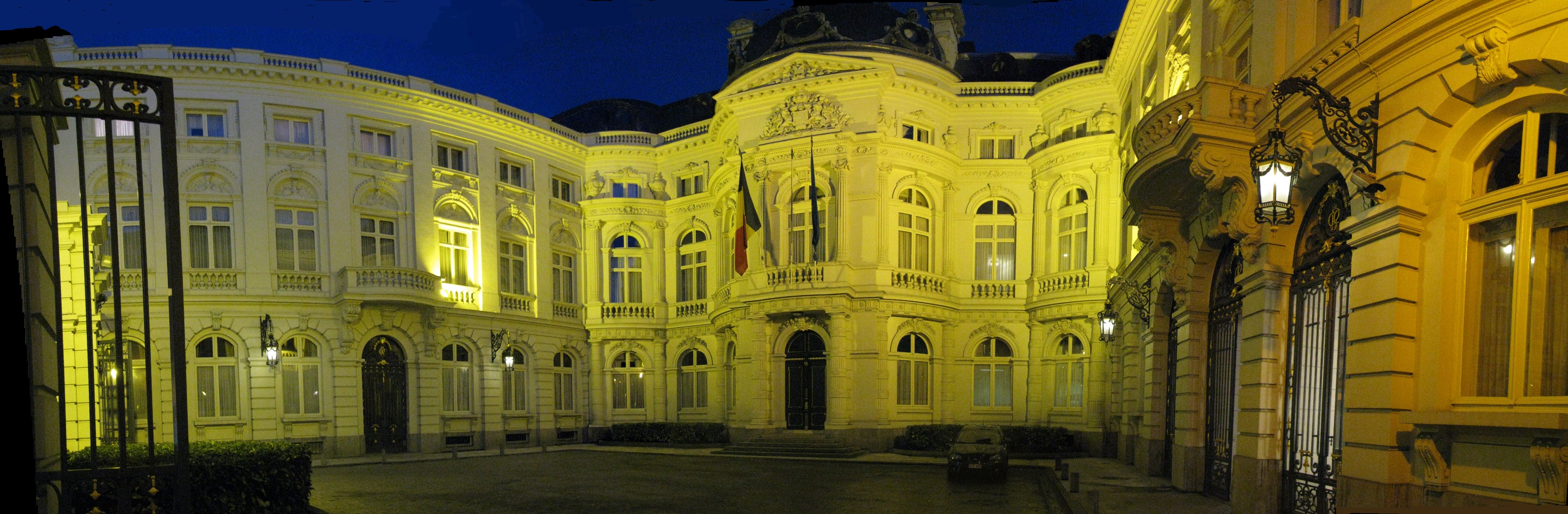
Panoramic view of the cour d'honneur (main courtyard)

== See also ==
- List of castles and châteaux in Belgium
- Neoclassical architecture in Belgium
- History of Brussels
- Culture of Belgium
- Belgium in the long nineteenth century
