= Philip of Flanders =

Philip of Flanders may refer to:

- Philip I, Count of Flanders (1143–1191)
- Prince Philippe, Count of Flanders (1837–1905)
