= Portrait of Prince Leopold =

1821 painting by Thomas Lawrence

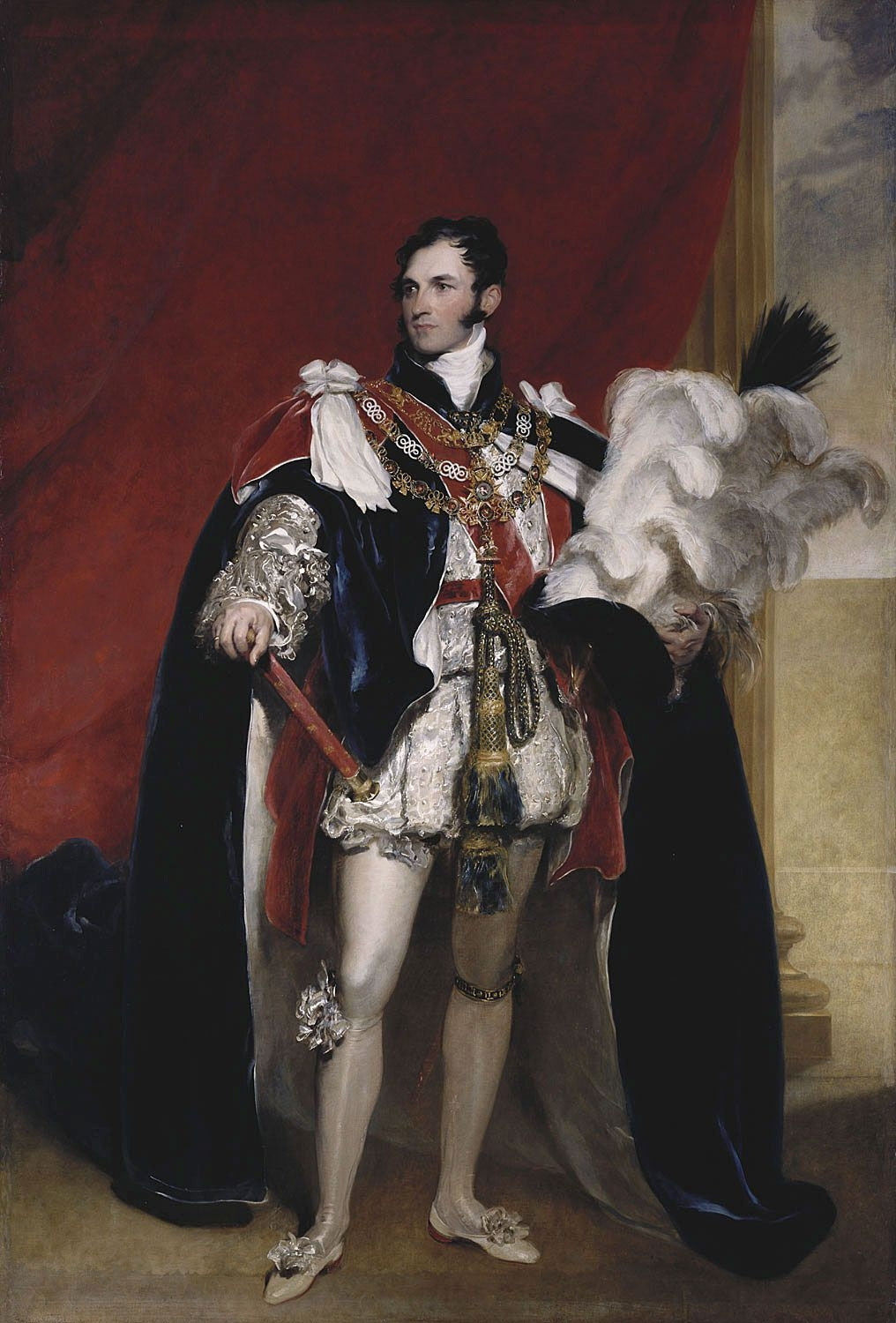
- Artist: Thomas Lawrence
- Year: 1821
- Type: Oil on canvas, portrait painting
- Dimensions: 271 cm × 183.9 cm (107 in × 72.4 in)
- Location: Royal Collection, Windsor Castle

Portrait of Prince Leopold is an 1821 portrait painting by the British artist Sir Thomas Lawrence depicting Prince Leopold of Saxe-Coburg-Saalfeld, who later became the first monarch of Belgium.

== History and description ==
Leopold had been married to the prospective heir to the British throne Princess Charlotte of Wales from 1816 until her death in childbirth the following year. His sister Victoria also married into the British royal family and through her he was uncle to the future Queen Victoria as well as a brother-in-law to George IV and William IV. In 1831 following the Belgian Revolution, Leopold became their sovereign with British and French backing.

Lawrence produced the painting in 1821 (having previously painted Leopold's wife Charlotte in 1817). He shows Leopold, then a widower and prominent figure in British society, in the robes of the Order of the Garter and holding a field marshal's baton. In 1841 Leopold, now King of Belgium, presented the painting to his nephew Prince Albert who was married to the young Queen Victoria. The couple decided to place it in the Waterloo Chamber at Windsor Castle. In this it differed from most of the other portraits in the Chamber which were specifically commissioned from Lawrence by the Prince Regent, to depict senior members of the Allied coalition that defeated Napoleon between 1813 and 1815.

Leopold had himself served as a colonel of cavalry in the Imperial Russian Army which was why Albert and Victoria chose to place it in the Waterloo Chamber. It remains in the Royal Collection at Windsor today.

== See also ==
- Portrait of Leopold I of Belgium, an 1840 painting by Franz Xaver Winterhalter

== Bibliography ==
- Bauer, Ludwig. Leopold, the Unloved: King of the Belgians and of Wealth. Little, Brown and Company, 2008.
- Goldring, Douglas. Regency Portrait Painter: The Life of Sir Thomas Lawrence. ISBN 1014181941. Macdonald, 1951.
- Levey, Michael. Sir Thomas Lawrence. ISBN 0300109989. Yale University Press, 2005.
- Robinson, John Martin. Windsor Castle: Official Guidebook. ISBN 1902163346. Royal Collection, 2006.
