= Portrait of Leopold I of Belgium =

Painting by Franz Xaver Winterhalter

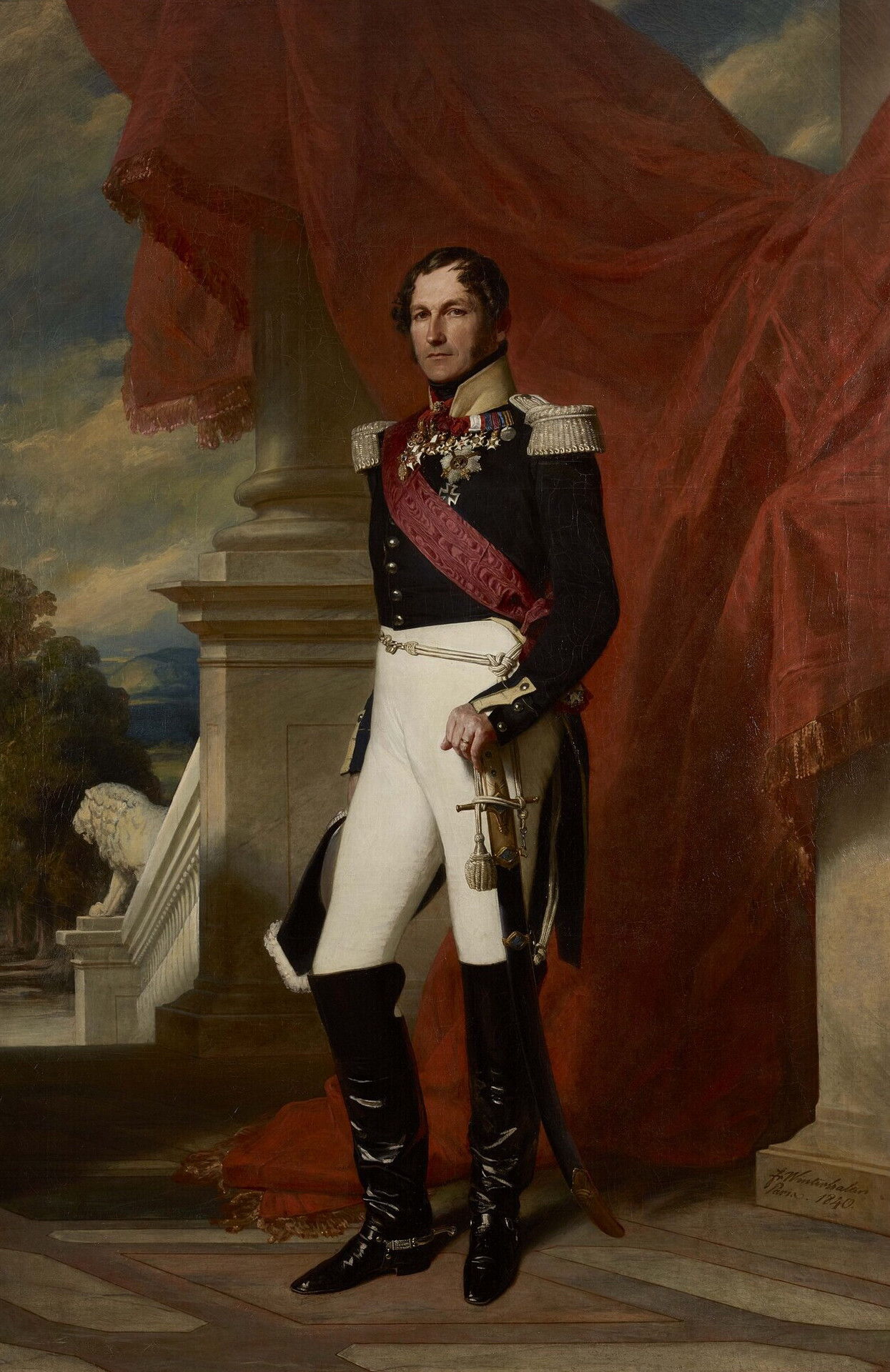
- Artist: Franz Xaver Winterhalter
- Year: 1840
- Type: Oil on canvas, portrait painting
- Dimensions: 278 cm × 181 cm (109 in × 71 in)
- Location: Palace of Versailles; Versailles

Portrait of Leopold I of Belgium is an oil on canvas portrait painting by the German artist Franz Xaver Winterhalter, from 1840. It depicts Leopold I of Belgium.

A German-born prince, Leopold had become the first King of the Belgians following the Belgian Revolution of 1830 that overthrew Dutch rule. He married a French princess Louise of Orléans in 1832. He was also the widower of Princess Charlotte of Wales, who had died in 1817, as well as the uncle of Queen Victoria.

The painting was commissioned by Leopold's father-in-law Louis Philippe I for the Musée de l'Histoire de France at the recently refurbished Palace of Versailles. In 1846 Leopold commissioned another portrait from Winterhalter as a gift for Queen Victoria, which remains in the British Royal Collection.

== See also ==
- Portrait of Prince Leopold, an 1821 painting by Thomas Lawrence

== Bibliography ==
- Belien, Paul. A Throne in Brussels: Britain, the Saxe-Coburgs and the Belgianisation of Europe. Imprint Academic, 2014. ISBN 9781845400330.
- Eismann, Ingeborg. Franz Xaver Winterhalter (1805-1873): der Fürstenmaler Europas. Imhof, 2007. ISBN 3865682030.
- Holden, Angus. Uncle Leopold; a Life of the First King of the Belgians. Hutchinson & Co, 1936.
- Lemoine, Pierre. Versailles and Trianon: Guide to the Museum and National Domain of Versailles and Trianon. "Réunion des musées nationaux", 1990. ISBN 2711823105.
- Scheele, Godfrey and Scheele, Margaret. The Prince Consort, Man of Many Facets: The World and the Age of Prince Albert. Oresko Books, 1977 ISBN 0846703211.
