= Princess Henriette of Belgium =

Princess Henriette
- Duchess of Vendôme
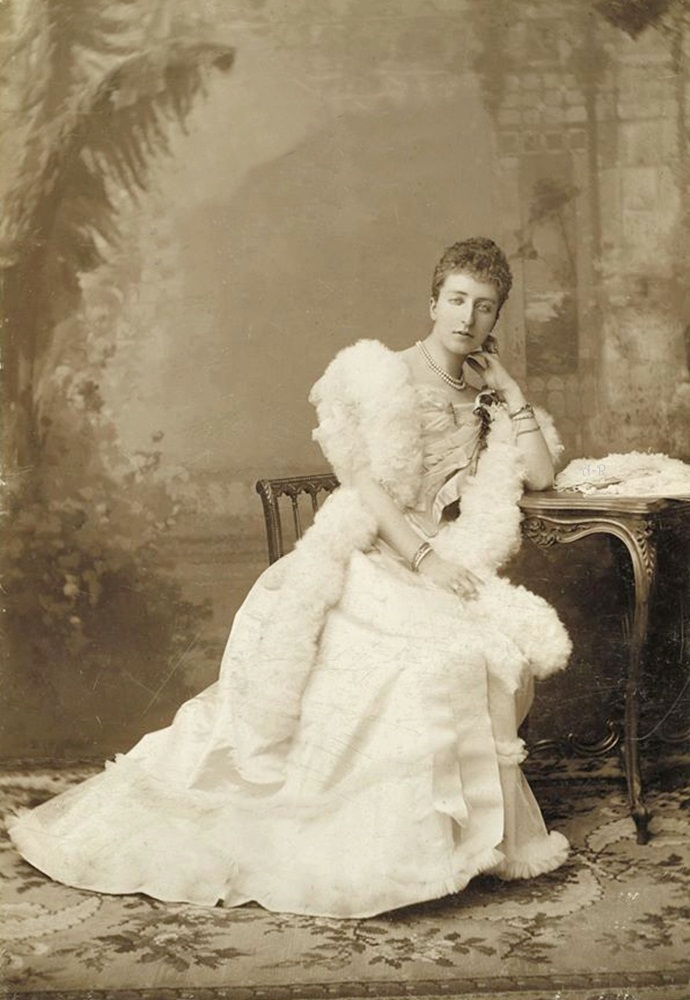
- Henriette in the mid 1890s
- Born: 30 November 1870; Brussels, Belgium
- Died: 28 March 1948 (aged 77); Sierre, Valais, Switzerland
- Burial: Chapelle royale de Dreux
- Spouse: Prince Emmanuel, Duke of Vendôme (m. 1896; died 1931)
- Issue: Marie Louise, Princess Philip of Bourbon-Two Sicilies; Princess Sophie; Princess Geneviève, Marchioness of Chaponay-Morance; Prince Charles Philippe, Duke of Nemours
Names
- French: Henriette Marie Charlotte Antoinette; Dutch: Henriëtte Maria Charlotte Antonia
- House: Saxe-Coburg and Gotha
- Father: Prince Philippe, Count of Flanders
- Mother: Princess Marie of Hohenzollern-Sigmaringen
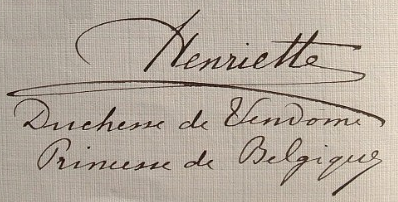
- Signature

Princess Henriette of Belgium (30 November 1870 – 28 March 1948), was the daughter of Prince Philippe, Count of Flanders, and Princess Marie of Hohenzollern. She was the younger twin sister of Princess Joséphine Marie of Belgium, who died at the age of six weeks in 1871. She was the eldest sister of King Albert I of Belgium.

== Marriage and family ==
Henriette was married in Brussels, Belgium, on 12 February 1896 to Prince Emmanuel d'Orléans, Duke of Vendôme (18 January 1872 – 1 February 1931). He was a son of Prince Ferdinand, Duke of Alençon, and Duchess Sophie Charlotte in Bavaria, and thus a great-grandson of King Louis Philippe I of France.

The couple had four children:

- Princess Marie Louise of Orléans (31 December 1896 – 8 March 1973); she married Prince Philip of Bourbon-Two Sicilies on 12 January 1916 and they were divorced in 1925. They had one son. She remarried to Walter Kingsland on 12 December 1928.
- Princess Sophie Joséphine Louise Marie Immaculée Gabrielle Philippine Henriette of Orléans (19 October 1898 – 9 October 1928); she was suggested as a potential bride for King Alexander I of Yugoslavia, but as soon as he discovered that she was intellectually disabled, the plan was dropped. He later married her second cousin, Princess Marie of Romania.
- Princess Geneviève Marie Jeanne Françoise Chantal Monique Louise Alberte Joséphine Gabrielle Emmanuelle Henriette of Orléans (21 September 1901 – 22 August 1983); she married Antoine Marie François de Chaponay, Marquis de Chaponay-Morance on 2 July 1923. They had two children:
  - Henryane de Chaponay-Morance (8 May 1924 - 9 October 2019)
  - Pierre de Chaponay-Morance (24 January 1925 - 2 October 1943); he died at the age of eighteen during World War II.
- Prince Charles Philippe, Duke of Nemours (4 April 1905 – 10 March 1970) he married Marguerite Watson (12 February 1899 - 27 Dec 1993) on 24 September 1928.

== Life ==
Henriette was a great sportswoman, and was often considered the best shot among the Belgian royal women. On one occasion, she killed a stag that had already killed another, making her very popular in Belgian sporting circles. She even earned the sobriquet the "Sporting Duchess". In 1908, she accompanied her husband to the Rocky Mountains in the United States to shoot grizzly bears.

Henriette often completed royal engagements for her brother King Albert. In 1914 for instance, she visited a hospital in Neuilly that was treating American troops. In two letters, Henriette and her sister-in-law Queen Elisabeth expressed their appreciation and asked for more support from the American Commission For Relief in Belgium, which had been giving donations to the Belgian people ever since the German invasion.

Henriette Marie of Belgium died aged 77, on 28 March 1948, in Sierre, Valais, Switzerland.

== Honours ==
- Kingdom of Bavaria : Dame of the Order of Saint Elizabeth, 1900: Wedding Gift in honour of her brother.

== Ancestry ==
Ancestors of Princess Henriette of Belgium

8. Francis, Duke of Saxe-Coburg-Saalfeld
4. Leopold I of Belgium
9. Countess Augusta Reuss of Ebersdorf
2. Prince Philippe, Count of Flanders
10. Louis Philippe I of France
5. Princess Louise of Orléans
11. Princess Maria Amalia of Naples and Sicily
1. Princess Henriette of Belgium
12. Karl, Prince of Hohenzollern-Sigmaringen
6. Karl Anton, Prince of Hohenzollern
13. Marie Antoinette Murat
3. Princess Marie of Hohenzollern-Sigmaringen
14. Charles, Grand Duke of Baden
7. Princess Josephine of Baden
15. Stéphanie de Beauharnais
