= Prince Philip of Bourbon-Two Sicilies =

European royal

Prince Philip
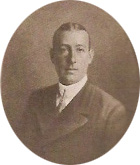
- Born: 10 December 1885; Cannes, France
- Died: 9 March 1949 (aged 63); Saint John, New Brunswick, Canada
- Spouse: Princess Marie Louise of Orléans (m. 1916; div. 1925) Odette Labori (m. 1927)
- Issue: Prince Gaetano
Names
- Italian: Filippo Maria Alfonso Antonio Ferdinando Francesco di Paola Lodovico Enrico Alberto Taddeo Francesco Saverio Uberto di Borbone
- House: Bourbon-Two Sicilies
- Father: Prince Alfonso, Count of Caserta
- Mother: Princess Maria Antonietta of Bourbon-Two Sicilies

Prince Philip of Bourbon-Two Sicilies (Filippo Maria Alfonso Antonio Ferdinando Francesco di Paola Lodovico Enrico Alberto Taddeo Francesco Saverio Uberto; 10 December 1885 – 9 March 1949) was a member of the House of Bourbon-Two Sicilies and a Prince of Bourbon-Two Sicilies.

== Family ==
Prince Philip was the tenth child of Prince Alfonso of Bourbon-Two Sicilies, Count of Caserta, and his wife, Princess Maria Antonietta of Bourbon-Two Sicilies.

== Marriage and issue ==
Philip married firstly to Princess Marie Louise of Orléans, eldest daughter and child of Prince Emmanuel, Duke of Vendôme and his wife Princess Henriette of Belgium, on 12 January 1916 in Neuilly-sur-Seine. The couple had one son before their divorce in 1925:

- Prince Gaetano Maria Alfonso Enrico Paolo of Bourbon-Two Sicilies (born 16 April 1917 in Cannes; died 27 December 1984 in Harare). On 16 February 1946 he married Olivia Yarrow (born 16 July 1917 in Dumfries; died 24 May 1987 in Harare) in Paddington. They had 2 sons. As the marriage was Morganatic, they had no dynastic rights to the throne of Two-Sicilies.:

- Adrian Philip de Bourbon (born 7 April 1948 in Warrington)

∞ Linda Idensohn (born 3 February 1950 in Salisbury) on 20 March 1976 in Salisbury

- Philip Charles de Bourbon (born 5 May 1977 in Harare)
- Michelle Lara de Bourbon (born 12 February 1979 in Harare)

- Gregory Peter de Bourbon (born 2 January 1950 in Warrington)

∞ Maureen Powell (born 19 April 1951 in Bulawayo) on 15 May 1971 in Rusape

- Christan Peter de Bourbon (born 11 April 1974 in Vancouver)
- Raymond Paul de Bourbon (born 8 November 1978 in Harare)

∞ Carrie Anne Thornley (born 2 February 1945 in Cessnock) on 30 August 1986 in Brisbane

Philip married secondly (this time morganatically) to Odette Labori, daughter of French attorney Fernand Labori, on 10 January 1927 in Paris. Philip and Odette did not have children.

== Honours ==
- Spain:
  - Grand Cross of the Order of Charles III, 8 October 1907
  - Knight of the Order of the Golden Fleece, 5 January 1916
  - Novice Knight of the Order of Alcántara

== Ancestry ==
Ancestors of Prince Philip of Bourbon-Two Sicilies

8. Francis I of the Two Sicilies
4. Ferdinand II of the Two Sicilies
9. Infanta Maria Isabella of Spain
2. Prince Alfonso, Count of Caserta
10. Archduke Charles, Duke of Teschen
5. Archduchess Maria Theresa of Austria
11. Princess Henrietta of Nassau-Weilburg
1. Prince Philip of Bourbon-Two Sicilies
12. Francis I of the Two Sicilies (= 8)
6. Prince Francis, Count of Trapani
13. Infanta Maria Isabella of Spain (= 9)
3. Princess Maria Antonietta of Bourbon-Two Sicilies
14. Leopold II, Grand Duke of Tuscany
7. Archduchess Maria Isabella of Austria
15. Princess Maria Antonia of the Two Sicilies
