= Court of Audit of Belgium =

Belgian governmental institution

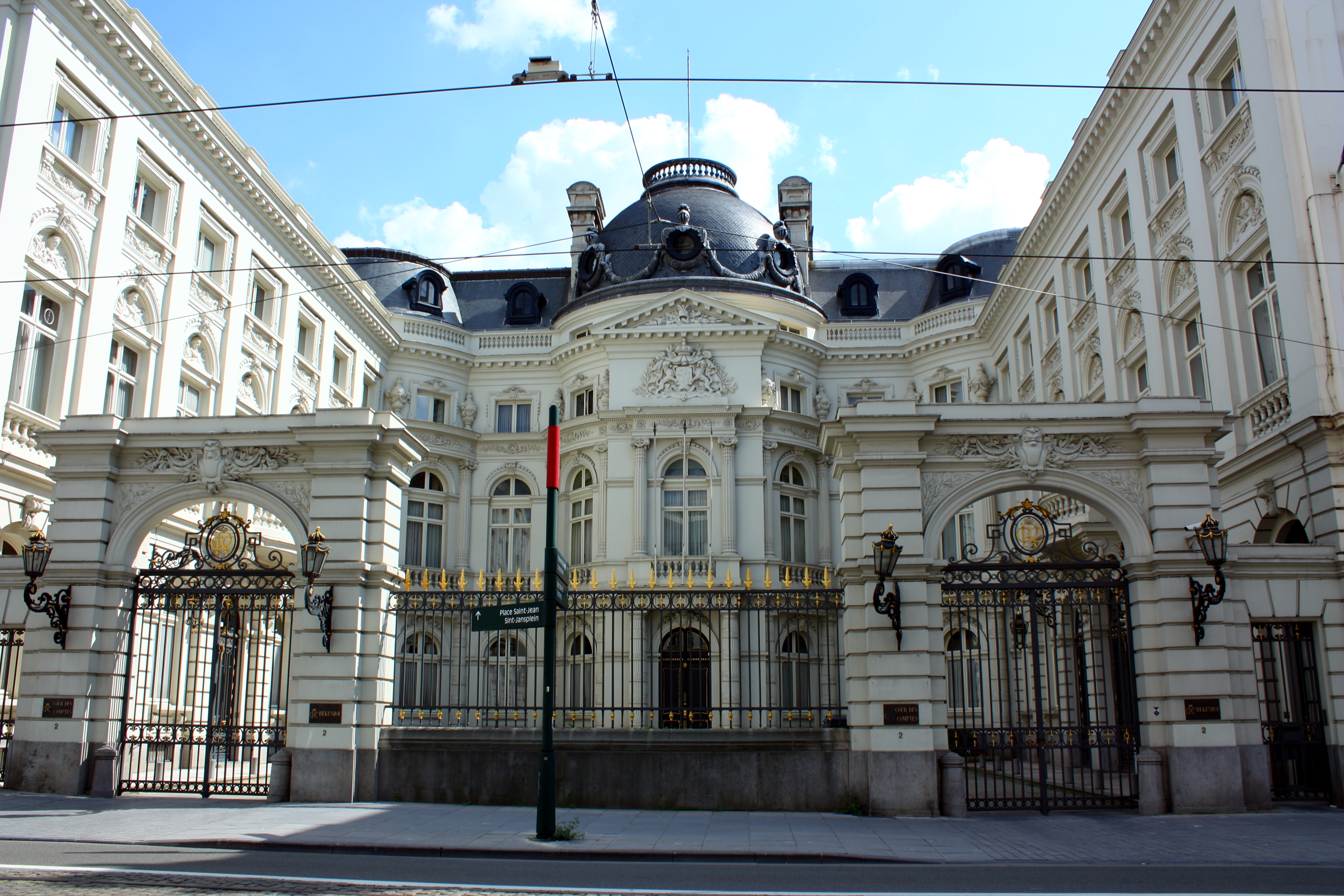
Court of Audit in the former Palace of the Count of Flanders, Brussels

The Court of Audit of Belgium (Dutch: Rekenhof [ˈreːkə(n)ɦɔf]; French: Cour des comptes [kuʁ de kɔ̃t]; German: Rechnungshof [ˈʁɛçnʊŋsˌhoːf]) is a Belgian governmental institution established by article 180 of the Belgian Constitution. The Court of Audit is a collateral body of the Belgian Federal Parliament and exerts external control on the budgetary, accounting and financial operations of the Federal State, the Communities, the Regions, the public service institutions and the provinces. The task of the Court of Audit is defined in its organic law of 29 October 1846. This law gives the Court of Audit a large independence and a wide autonomy to perform its missions.

The Court of Audit carries out its tasks at its own initiative. The principle of general independence is a guarantee of objectivity and impartiality. The legislative assemblies can charge to charge the Court of Audit with specific missions of management analysis.

== History ==
The Court of Audit can trace its historical lineage to the Chamber of Accounts in the County of Flanders and Chamber of Accounts established in 1386 for Flanders and Burgundy by Philip the Bold. By letters of patent in 1406, Philip's second son Antoine of Burgundy set up a chamber of accounts for the Duchy of Brabant. The Chamber of Accounts was entrusted with the monitoring and the closing of the accounts of all paymasters of the duchy. These Chambers existed in various forms until the independence of Belgium in 1830. After the independence the National Congress voted on 30 December 1830 to establishing the Court of Audit of which the first members were appointed on 6 January 1831. Article 116 of the Constitution of 1831 enshrined the existence of this institution and defined its powers.

In 1955 it hosted II INCOSAI, the second triennial convention of the International Organization of Supreme Audit Institutions.

Since January 1984, the Court of Audit is situated in the former Palace of the Count of Flanders at 2, rue de la Régence/Regentschapsstraat, Brussels.

== Competences ==
=== Financial audit ===
The Federal State, the Communities, the Regions, the public service institutions depending on those entities and the 10 provinces have to report annually on their use of the public funds. These accounts are transmitted to the Court of Audit, which verifies the accuracy, the reliability and the completeness of the entries in the financial statements. The Court of Audit also checks the conformity of the recorded transactions with the accounting legislation.

The Court also checks and closes the accounts of the public accounting officers who are in charge of the collection and/or payment of the public funds. The Court considers whether their accounts are in balance, whether the balance is in their favour or in the State's favour. In the two first cases, it draws up a discharge judgment. The third case gives rise to an administrative deficit judgment that might result in the carrying out of the jurisdictional task.

=== The legality audit ===
The Court of Audit performs a legality audit on the public expenditures and receipts by checking their conformity with the budgetary law. The Court of Audit ensures that the law rules applicable to the controlled operation are correctly implemented.

The legality audit is carried out through prior approval of the payment orders relating to the expenditures. No payment can be made without the approval of the Court of Audit. If the Court of Audit withholds its approval, the Government can decide that payment should still take place. The Court of Audit then approves with reservation and immediately informs the concerned legislative assembly to which it explains its reasons for doing so.

=== Performance audit ===
As an institution linked to the Parliament, the Court of Audit is charged with the monitoring of the sound use of public funds according to the principles of economy, effectiveness and efficiency, so it can inform the Parliament about the way the public services are managed.

- The economy audit assesses whether the implemented financial, human and material resources have qualitatively and quantitatively been acquired and used at the lowest cost and at the right moment.
- The effectiveness audit assesses the extent to which the stated goals and objectives have been attained.
- The efficiency audit assesses the output for a given amount of resources by ensuring that the financial human and material resources are implemented for optimal results.

=== Informational task ===
The Court of Audit informs the various legislative assemblies and the provincial councils of the results of its audit missions. The Court of Audit submits its audit reports to the assemblees and councils in the form of syntheses integrated into the annual Book of comments (the so-called "blunder book") or in the form of special publications. The Court of Audit informs the legislative assemblies of the commitments, authorizations or payments of expenditures exceeding the budget appropriations and comments on the budget drafts submitted to the legislative assemblies.

=== Jurisdictional task ===
The Belgian Constitution charges the Court of Audit with auditing and validating the accounts of the general administration and of all accounting officers answerable to the Treasury. The accounts of these officers are yearly sent to the Court or in the event of a deficit and when they leave office.

The Court of Audit decides by administrative ruling whether these accounts are in balance, whether the balance is in their favour or in the State's favour. If the ruling shows a deficit the officer has to appear before the Court of Audit. After a public procedure the Court of Audit either exonerates the accounting officer or condemns him to make good that amount or part of it. The rulings can be appealed to the Court of Cassation. If the judgement is vacated, the case will be referred to an appropriate "ad hoc" committee, made up of members of the Belgian Chamber of Representatives who judge the case without the possibility of any subsequent appeal.

The Court of Audit can require the authorizing officers delegated by the minister to repay the amounts if they have committed appropriations in violation of the legal provisions or incurred losses to be paid by the treasury.

=== Statements of offices held and declarations of assets ===
Certain categories of political representatives and senior officials are required to file a statement of offices, functions and occupations with the Court of Audit. They are also required to file a declaration of assets in accordance with a fixed schedule. The Court of Audit is in charge of controlling, storing and publishing these documents.

== Organization ==
The Court of Audit consists of a college of 12 magistrates, assisted by civil servants. The Court of Audit is divided a French-speaking and a Dutch-speaking chamber. Each chamber consists of a president, four councilors and a registrar. The senior of the two presidents is designated First President and the senior of the two registrars is Chief Registrar. All members of the Court of Audit are elected by the Belgian Chamber of Representatives for terms of six years and can be reappointed.
