= Lugrin =

- Commune
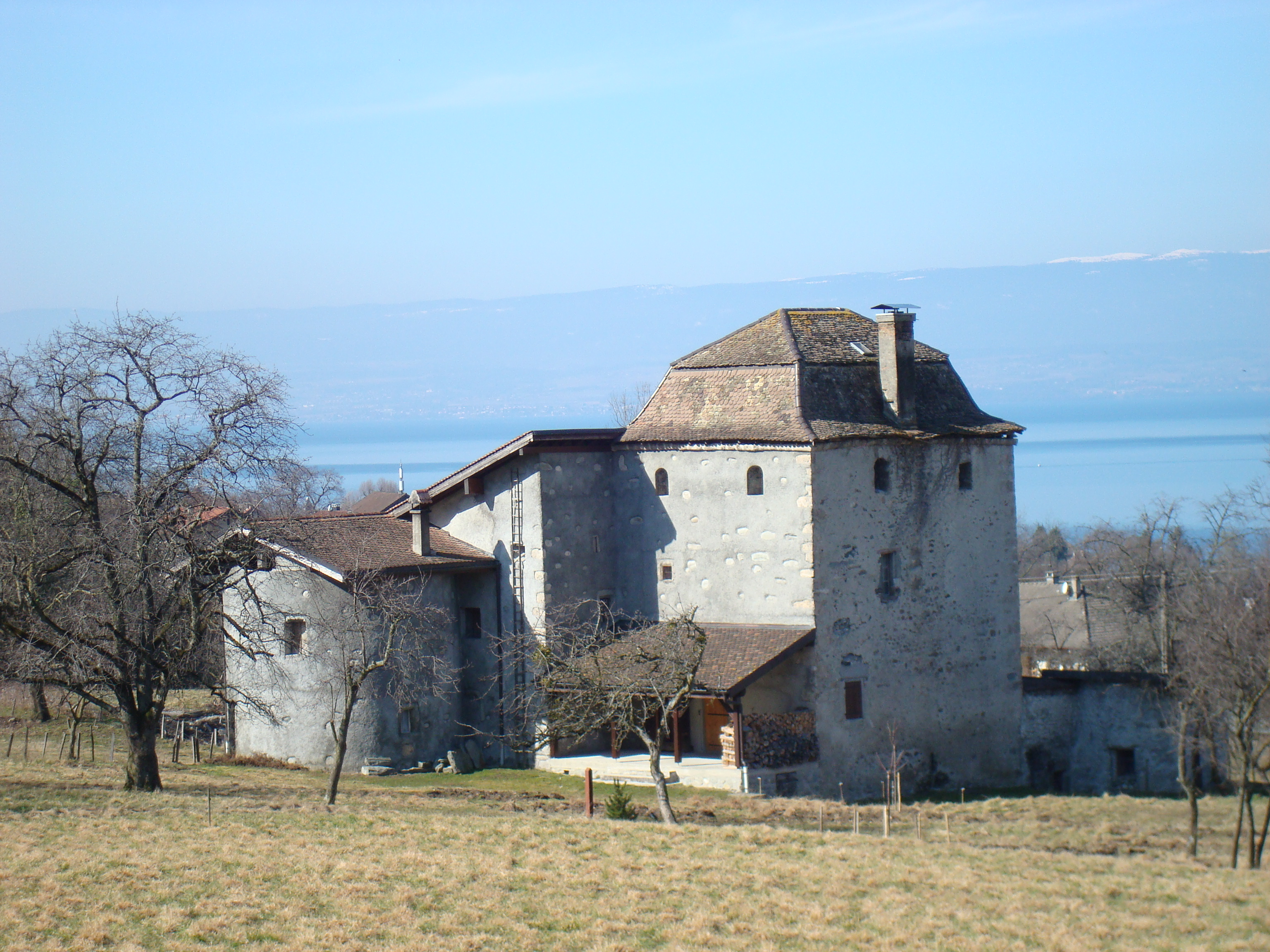
- The fortified house of Chatillon

- Coat of arms
- Location of Lugrin
- Location within France Location within Auvergne-Rhône-Alpes
- Coordinates: 46°24′04″N 6°39′53″E
- Country: France
- Region: Auvergne-Rhône-Alpes
- Department: Haute-Savoie
- Arrondissement: Thonon-les-Bains
- Canton: Évian-les-Bains
- Intercommunality: Pays d'Évian Vallée d'Abondance

Government
  - Mayor (2020–2026): Jacques Burnet
- Area^{1}: 13.22 km^{2} (5.10 sq mi)
- Highest elevation: 1,248 m (4,094 ft)
- Lowest elevation: 373 m (1,224 ft)
- Population (2023): 2,614
  - Density: 197.7/km^{2} (512.1/sq mi)
- Demonym: Lugrinois / Lugrinoises
- Time zone: UTC+01:00 (CET)
  - Summer (DST): UTC+02:00 (CEST)
- INSEE/Postal code: 74154 /74500
- ^{1} French Land Register data, which excludes lakes, ponds, glaciers > 1 km^{2} (0.386 sq mi or 247 acres) and river estuaries.

Lugrin (French pronunciation: [lyɡʁɛ̃]; Arpitan: Lgrin) is a commune in the Haute-Savoie department in the Auvergne-Rhône-Alpes region in south-eastern France.

== Population ==
Historical population
| Year | Pop. | ±% p.a. |
|---|---|---|
| 1968 | 1,344 | — |
| 1975 | 1,334 | −0.11% |
| 1982 | 1,417 | +0.87% |
| 1990 | 2,025 | +4.56% |
| 1999 | 1,997 | −0.15% |
| 2007 | 2,174 | +1.07% |
| 2012 | 2,336 | +1.45% |
| 2017 | 2,435 | +0.83% |
| 2023 | 2,614 | +1.19% |
Source: INSEE

== See also ==
- Communes of the Haute-Savoie department
