= Princess Marie of Hohenzollern-Sigmaringen =

Princess Marie
- Countess of Flanders
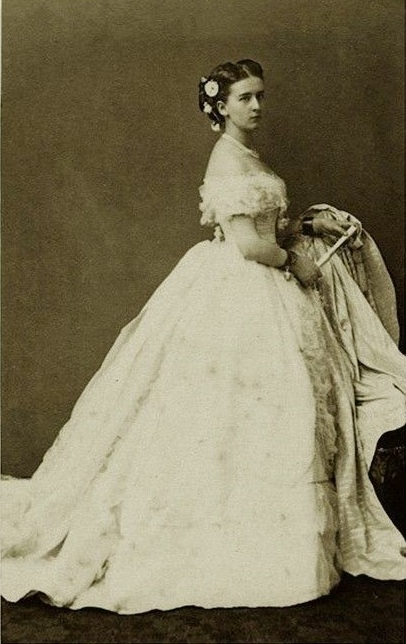
- Marie in the 1860s
- Born: 17 November 1845; Sigmaringen, Hohenzollern-Sigmaringen
- Died: 26 November 1912 (aged 67); Brussels, Belgium
- Burial: Church of Our Lady of Laeken
- Spouse: Prince Philippe, Count of Flanders (m. 1867; died 1905)
- Issue: Prince Baudouin; Princess Henriette, Duchess of Vendôme; Princess Joséphine-Marie; Princess Joséphine-Caroline, Princess Karl Anton of Hohnezollern; Albert I, King of the Belgians
Names
- Marie Luise Alexandra Karoline
- House: Hohenzollern-Sigmaringen
- Father: Karl Anton, Prince of Hohenzollern
- Mother: Princess Josephine of Baden
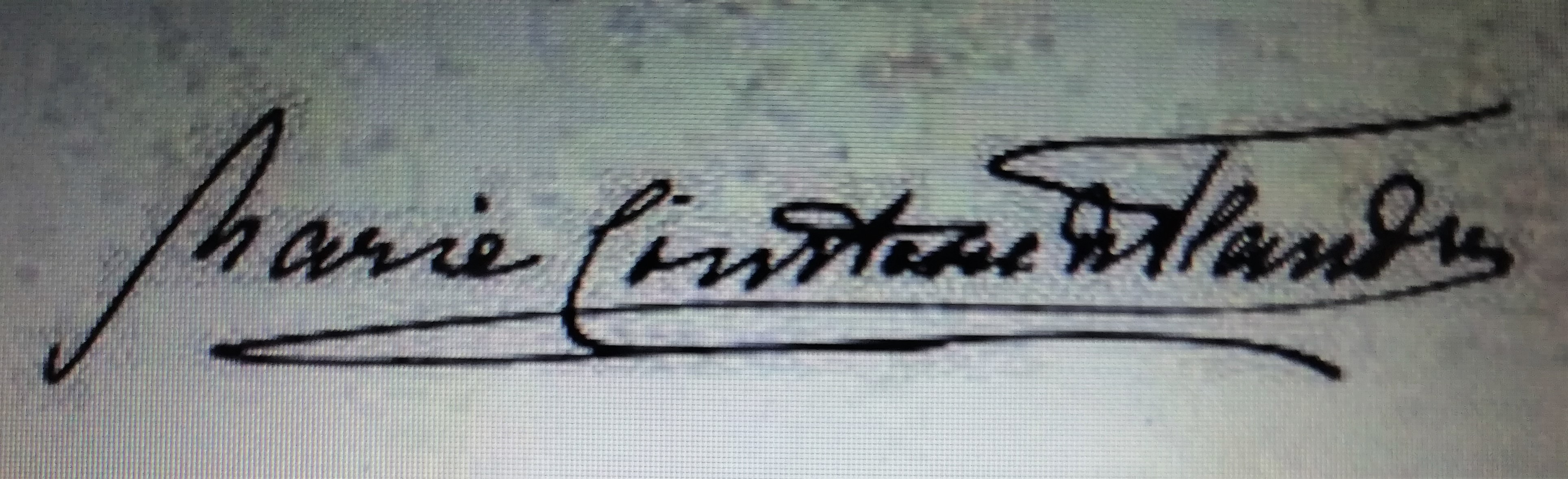
- Signature

Princess Marie of Hohenzollern-Sigmaringen (17 November 1845 – 26 November 1912), later Countess of Flanders, was a princess of Hohenzollern-Sigmaringen, later simply of Hohenzollern. She married Prince Philippe, Count of Flanders, second son of King Leopold I of Belgium, and she was the mother of King Albert I.

== Family ==
Marie was the youngest daughter and last of the six children of Prince Karl Anton, Prince of Hohenzollern, Prime minister of Prussia and Princess Josephine of Baden, and a younger sister of Prince Leopold, Prince of Hohenzollern, King Carol I of Romania and of Queen Stephanie, Queen Consort of Portugal.

== Marriage ==
Marie was considered as a potential wife for the future King Edward VII of the United Kingdom. Though she was considered "quite lovely" by his family, her Roman Catholic religion barred her from being a suitable consort for the head of the Anglican church. On 25 April 1867 at St. Hedwig's Cathedral in Berlin, she married Prince Philippe, Count of Flanders, second son of King Leopold I of Belgium and Louise-Marie of Orléans.

They had five children:

- Prince Baudouin of Belgium (3 June 1869 – 23 January 1891) he died of influenza at the age of 21.
- Princess Henriette of Belgium (30 November 1870 – 28 March 1948) she was the twin of Princess Joséphine Marie of Belgium. She married Prince Emmanuel, Duke of Vendôme on 12 February 1896. They had four children.
- Princess Joséphine Marie of Belgium (30 November 1870 — 18 January 1871) she died at one month.
- Princess Joséphine Caroline of Belgium (18 October 1872 – 6 January 1958) she married Prince Karl Anton of Hohenzollern on 28 May 1894. They had four children.
- King Albert I of Belgium (8 April 1875 – 17 February 1934) he married Duchess Elisabeth in Bavaria on 2 October 1900. They had three children.

Princess Marie was an accomplished artist, even occasionally exhibiting her paintings at the Brussels Fair. She had a literary salon, which was the gathering place of many authors as well as a feature of Brussels social life for forty years. She also demonstrated appreciation for music, on one occasion awarding a gold medal to the Zoellner Quartet after it performed for the Belgian royalty.

== Death ==
Marie Luise died in Belgium in 1912 at the age of 67, after suffering from pneumonia for several days. She was buried in the Church of Our Lady of Laeken.

== Honours ==
- Kingdom of Bavaria: Dame of the Order of Saint Elizabeth, 1900: wedding gift in honour of her son.
- Kingdom of Spain: 723rd Dame of the Order of Queen Maria Luisa - .
- Dame of the Starry Cross.
- Dame grand Cross in the Order of the Iron Crown.
- Dame of the Order of Saint Isabel.

== Ancestry ==
Ancestors of Princess Marie of Hohenzollern-Sigmaringen

8. Anton Aloys, Prince of Hohenzollern-Sigmaringen
4. Karl, Prince of Hohenzollern-Sigmaringen
9. Princess Amalie Zephyrine of Salm-Kyrburg
2. Karl Anton, Prince of Hohenzollern
10. Pierre Murat
5. Marie Antoinette Murat
11. Louise d'Astorg
1. Princess Marie of Hohenzollern-Sigmaringen
12. Charles Louis, Hereditary Prince of Baden
6. Charles, Grand Duke of Baden
13. Princess Amalie of Hesse-Darmstadt
3. Princess Josephine of Baden
14. Claude de Beauharnais, comte des Roches-Baritaud
7. Stéphanie de Beauharnais
15. Adrienne de Lézay-Marnézia

== Sources ==
- Media related to Princess Marie, Countess of Flanders at Wikimedia Commons
- Hibbert, Christopher (2007). Edward VII: The Last Victorian King. New York: Palgrave Macmillan.
