= Prince Philippe, Count of Flanders =

Belgian prince (1837–1905)

Prince Philippe
- Count of Flanders
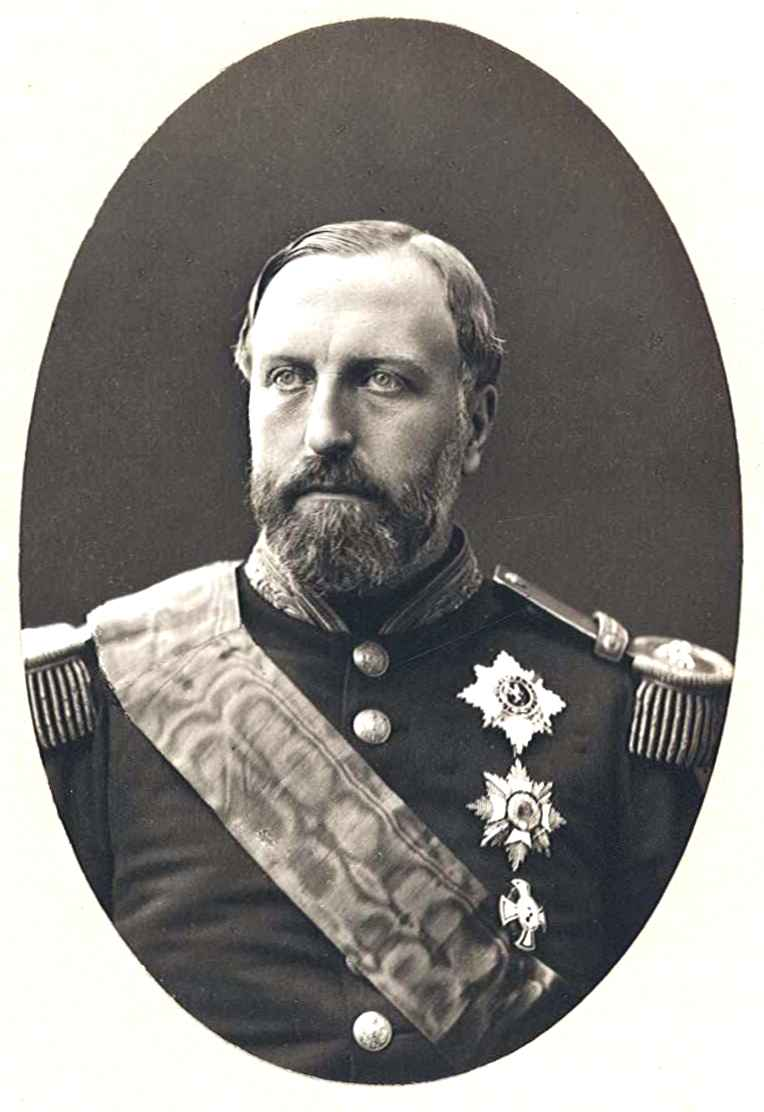
- Prince Philippe, c. 1880
- Born: 24 March 1837; Royal Castle of Laeken, Laeken, Belgium
- Died: 17 November 1905 (aged 68); Palace of the Count of Flanders, Brussels, Belgium
- Burial: Church of Our Lady of Laeken
- Spouse: Princess Marie of Hohenzollern-Sigmaringen (m. 1867)
- Issue: Prince Baudouin; Princess Henriette, Duchess of Vendôme; Princess Joséphine; Joséphine, Princess Karl Anton of Hohenzollern; Albert I of Belgium
Names
- French: Philippe Eugène Ferdinand Marie Clément Baudouin Léopold Georges; Dutch: Filips Eugeen Ferdinand Marie Clemens Boudewijn Leopold Joris
- House: Saxe-Coburg and Gotha
- Father: Leopold I of Belgium
- Mother: Louise of Orléans

Prince Philippe of Belgium, Count of Flanders (Dutch: Filips; 24 March 1837 – 17 November 1905), was the third born and second surviving son of King Leopold I of Belgium and Louise d'Orléans. He was the brother of Leopold II of Belgium and Empress Carlota of Mexico.

Born at the Château de Laeken, near Brussels, Belgium, Philippe was created Count of Flanders on 14 December 1840.

He refused the crown of Greece, which was offered to him in 1862. In 1866, after the abdication of Alexandru Ioan Cuza, Philippe refused the throne of Romania, which was then accepted by his brother-in-law Carol I.

In January 1869, upon the sudden death of his nephew Prince Leopold, Duke of Brabant, he became heir presumptive to the Belgian throne.

Philippe died in 1905. When King Leopold II died in 1909, Philippe's second son ascended the Belgian throne as King Albert I.

== Marriage and issue ==
On 25 April 1867 at St. Hedwig's Cathedral in Berlin, he married Princess Marie of Hohenzollern-Sigmaringen. They had five children:

- Prince Baudouin (3 June 1869 – 23 January 1891)
- Princess Henriette (30 November 1870 – 28 March 1948)
- Princess Joséphine Marie (30 November 1870 – 18 January 1871)
- Princess Joséphine Caroline (18 October 1872 – 6 January 1958)
- King Albert I (8 April 1875 – 17 February 1934)

He died in his residence the Palace of the Count of Flanders, and is buried at the Church of Our Lady of Laeken.

== Honours ==
He received the following decorations and awards:

Domestic

- Grand Cordon of the Order of Leopold (civil), 24 March 1855

Foreign

- Duchy of Anhalt: Grand Cross of Albert the Bear, 1874
- Austrian Empire: Grand Cross of St. Stephen, 1857
- Baden:
  - Knight of the House Order of Fidelity, 1862
  - Grand Cross of the Zähringer Lion
- Kingdom of Bavaria: Knight of St. Hubert
- Empire of Brazil: Grand Cross of the Southern Cross
- Denmark: Knight of the Elephant, 1 November 1875
- (Saxe-Coburg and Gotha) (Duchy of Saxe-Altenburg) (Saxe-Meiningen) Ernestine duchies: Grand Cross of the Saxe-Ernestine House Order, December 1853
- French Empire: Grand Cross of the Legion of Honour
- Holy See: Grand Cross of the Holy Sepulchre of Jerusalem
- Sovereign Military Order of Malta: Bailiff Grand Cross of Honour and Devotion
- Empire of Japan: Grand Cordon of the Order of the Chrysanthemum, 5 November 1898
- Netherlands: Grand Cross of the Netherlands Lion
- Luxembourg: Knight of the Gold Lion of Nassau
- Ottoman Empire: Order of Osmanieh, 1st Class
- Kingdom of Portugal: Grand Cross of the Tower and Sword, 12 December 1854
- Kingdom of Prussia:
  - Knight of the Black Eagle, 7 October 1855; with Collar, 1861
  - Grand Cross of the Red Eagle
  - Grand Commander's Cross of the Royal House Order of Hohenzollern, 4 May 1867
- Kingdom of Romania: Grand Cross of the Star of Romania
- Russian Empire:
  - Knight of St. Andrew
  - Knight of St. Alexander Nevsky
  - Knight of the White Eagle
  - Knight of St. Anna, 1st Class
- Saxe-Weimar-Eisenach: Grand Cross of the White Falcon, 20 September 1854
- Kingdom of Saxony: Knight of the Rue Crown, 1857
- Spain:
  - Grand Cross of the Order of Charles III, 6 April 1863
  - Knight of the Golden Fleece, 21 January 1872
- Sweden-Norway:
  - Knight of the Seraphim, 17 May 1856
  - Grand Cross of St. Olav, 25 July 1860
- Württemberg: Grand Cross of the Württemberg Crown, 1864

== Arms ==
Coat of Arms of the Count of Flanders (1837-1909)

Royal Monogram of Prince Philippe of Belgium, Count of Flanders

== Literature ==
- Bilteryst, Damien (2014). Philippe comte de Flandre : Frère de Léopold II (PDF) (in French). Brussels: Éditions Racine. p. 336. ISBN 978-2-87386-894-9.
- Defrance, Olivier (2014). Les vacances des comtes de Flandre : Autour de la Chronique des Amerois. Fonds du Patrimoine (in French). Brussels: Éditions Fondation Roi Baudouin. ISBN 978-2-87212-731-3.
- Schweisthal, Martin (1908). "S.A.R. Philippe, Comte de Flandre : Essai biographique". Annales de la Société royale d'Archéologie de Bruxelles (in French). XXII. Brussels.
- Wilmet, Louis (1956). Intimités royales : les parents du Roi Albert dans leur domaine des Amerois en Ardenne (in French). Spa: Éditions J'ose.

Prince Philippe, Count of Flanders House of Saxe-Coburg-Gotha Cadet branch of the House of Wettin Born: 24 March 1837 Died: 17 November 1905
Belgian royalty
New title	Count of Flanders; 14 December 1840 – 17 November 1905	Vacant Title next held by Prince Charles
