= Théophile de Giraud =

Belgian writer, philosopher and activist (born 1968)

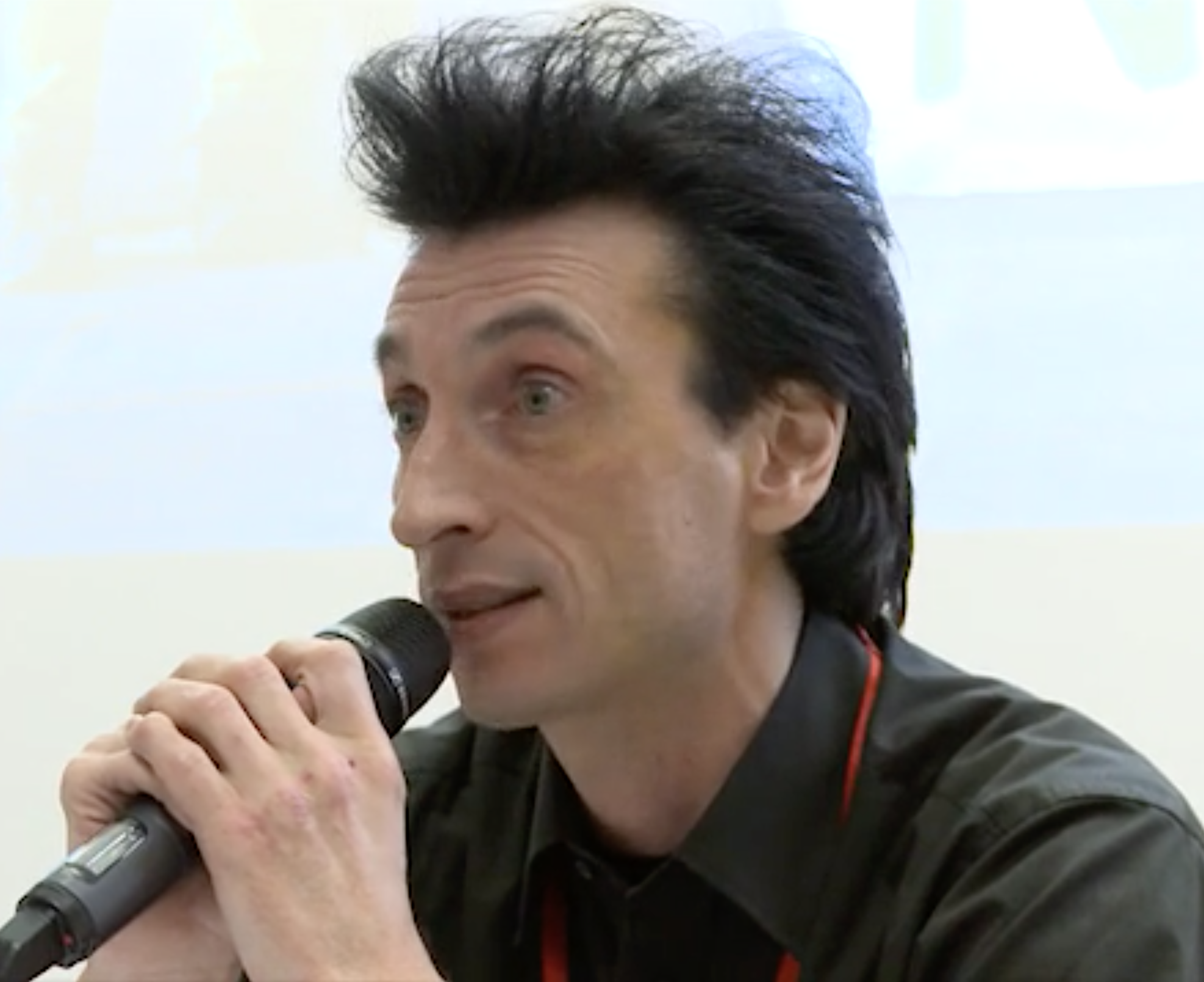
- Giraud in 2014
- Born: 19 November 1968 (age 57); Namur, Belgium
- Occupations: Writer; philosopher; activist
- Known for: Antinatalism, childfree and political activism
- Awards: Belgian Vocation Foundation (1998); Childfree Man of the Year (2013)
- Website: theophiledegiraud.e-monsite.com

Théophile de Giraud (born 19 November 1968) is a Belgian writer, philosopher and activist associated with antinatalism and childfree advocacy. Writing in French, he has published essays, poetry, and manifestos on reproduction, ethics, demography, and related subjects. His activism has included events connected with antinatalism and childfree advocacy, ecological arguments about population, and protests against public commemoration of Leopold II of Belgium. He received an award from the Belgian Vocation Foundation in 1998 and was named Childfree Man of the Year in 2013.

== Literary work ==
Giraud's first book, The Impertinence of Procreation, was published in 2000. It argues against human reproduction and uses humour and provocation. He was described in Le Carnet et les Instants as noted for eccentricities, and was listed in André Blavier's anthology Les Fous Littéraires.

Giraud's essay The Art of Guillotining the Procreators: Anti-Natalist Manifesto, published in 2006, is a revised version of his first book. Its central phrase is "If you love children, don't create them". In the work, Giraud argues that life is marked by suffering and that ethics is incompatible with reproduction. He also argues for school training for parenthood, adoption, and a procreation strike against reproduction imposed by patriarchy. The book cites classical authors in support of its arguments.

In 2008, Giraud published a poetic essay on cold wave, Cold Love, Satanic Sex and Funny Suicide, with a preface by Jean-Luc De Meyer, singer of Front 242. The work uses song excerpts to discuss themes in cold wave and the origins of the Gothic movement, including sex, death, family, the end of the world, and human extinction. A review in PPPZine described its style as humorous and inventive.

Giraud also contributed to the collective book Fewer, More Happy: The Urgency to Rethink Demography, edited by Michel Sourrouille.

== Activism ==
Giraud is associated with the antinatalism and childfree movements. He was one of the creators of Non-Parents Day, which was held between 2009 and 2011 in Brussels and Paris. In 2008, he covered a statue of Leopold II in Brussels with red paint to protest against public commemoration of the king and his role in the colonial system of the Belgian Congo. In 2012, he organised a "denatalist" event in Paris about overpopulation and refusal to give birth for ecological reasons.

== Awards ==
- Winner of the Belgian Vocation Foundation (1998)
- Childfree Man of the Year (2013)

== Publications ==
- The Impertinence of Procreation, Brussels, self-published, 2000
- One Hundred Necromantic Haikus, preface by Jean-Pierre Verheggen, foreword and afterword by André Stas, Spa, ed. Galopin, 2004 (ISBN 9782916086071)
- The Art of Guillotining Procreators: An Anti-natalist Manifesto, Nancy, ed. Le Mort-Qui-Trompe, 2006 (ISBN 978-2916502007)
- Diogenesis, Fluorescent Poems to Wait Between Two Genocides, Brussels, ed. Maelström, 2008 (ISBN 978-2-9303-5587-0)
- Cold Love, Satanic Sex and Funny Suicide, preface by Jean-Luc De Meyer, Nancy, ed. Le Mort-Qui-Trompe, 2008 (ISBN 9782916502076)
- Aphorisms for the Use of Future Familicides, preface by Corinne Maier, foreword by Serge Poliart, Brussels, ed. Maelström, 2013 (ISBN 2-9165-0200-9)
- The Childfree Christ: Antinatalism in Early Christianity, ed. AFNIL, 2021 (ISBN 978-2960273700)

== See also ==
- David Benatar
- Atrocities in the Congo Free State
- Voluntary Human Extinction Movement
