= Arcadie Claret =

Belgian noblewoman and mistress of Leopold I

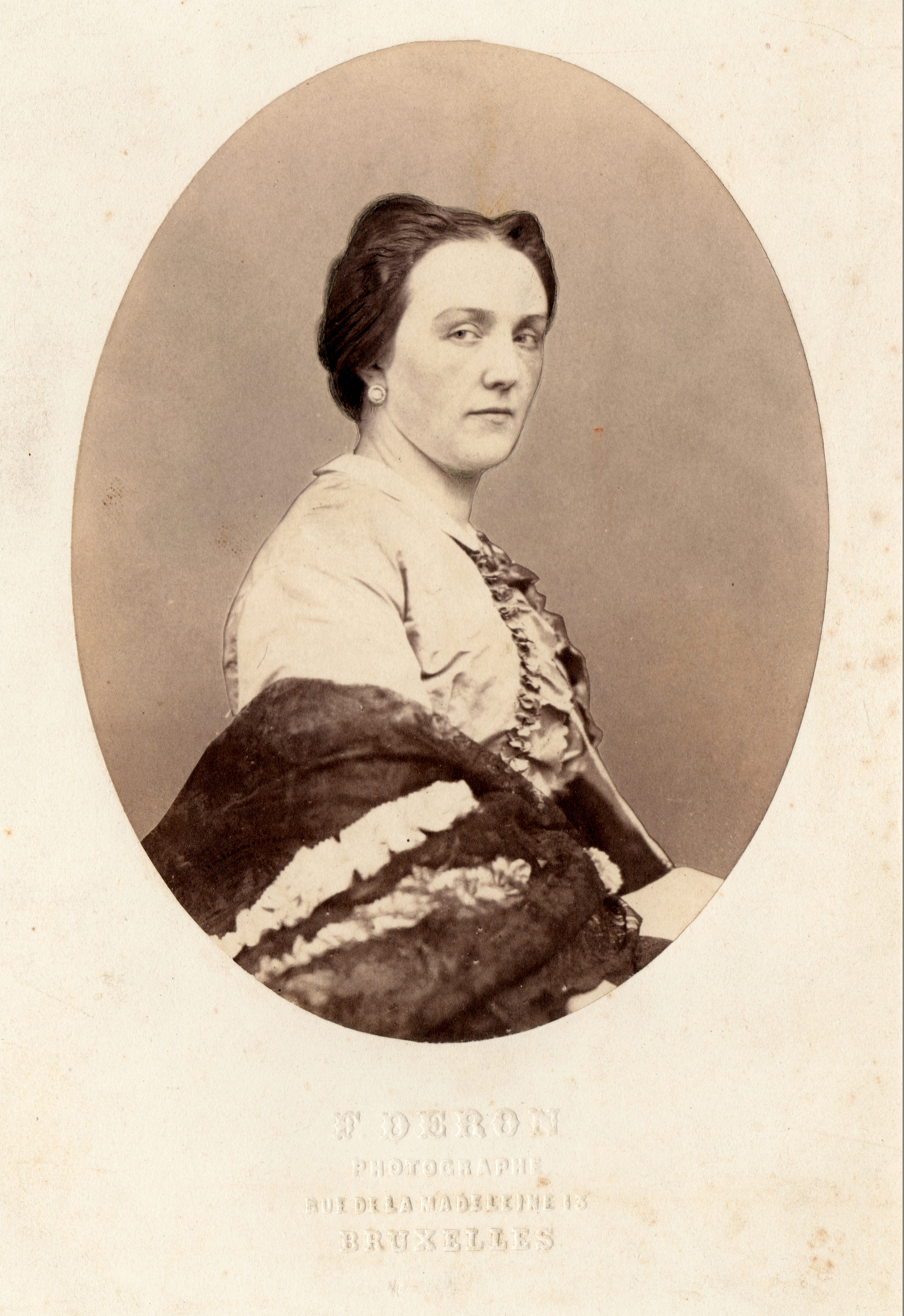
- Born: Marie-Anne Arcadie Eugénie Claret; 30 May 1826; Brussels, United Kingdom of the Netherlands
- Died: 13 January 1897 (aged 70); Monheim am Rhein, German Empire
- Other names: Arcadie Meyer
- Known for: Mistress of Leopold I of Belgium
- Title: Baroness of Eppinghoven
- Spouse: Ferdinand Meyer (married 1845 – divorced 1861)
- Partner: Leopold I of Belgium (circa 1842/before 1844 – 1865)
- Children: Georges-Frédéric Baron von Eppinghoven; Arthur Chretian Frederic Baron d'Eppinghoven
- Parent(s): Charles-Joseph Claret; Henriette Neetteezoone

Arcadie Meyer, Baroness of Eppinghoven, born Marie-Anne Arcadie Eugénie Claret (30 May 1826 – 13 January 1897), was a Belgian noblewoman and the mistress of Leopold I, King of the Belgians for more than twenty years, causing a national scandal.

== Life ==
=== Early life ===
Marie-Anne Arcadie Eugénie Claret was born on 30 May 1826 in Brussels, United Kingdom of the Netherlands as the daughter of Major (later Lieutenant colonel) Charles-Joseph Claret (1789–1867), treasurer of the Pension Fund for Widows and Orphans of the Belgian Army. She had twelve siblings. The Claret family lived in a mansion in the middle of a park in Etterbeek.

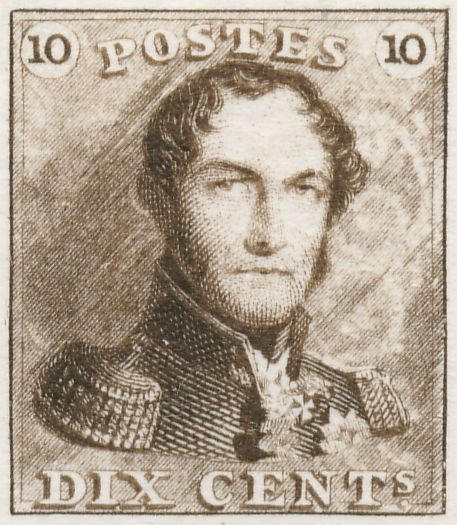
Leopold I on a stamp from 1849

=== Relationship with Leopold I ===
Claret met Leopold I, King of the Belgians (1790–1865) between 1842 and 1844. Depending on the exact date of their meeting, she was between the ages of 15 and 18, and he was between 51 and 54. Soon, she became his mistress, and was moved into a luxurious house on the Rue Royale/Koningsstraat in Brussels. Their affair could not remain secret and was widely discussed in the Belgian press.

==== Marriage ====
In order to reduce negative media attention towards his mistress, the king married Claret to the master of the royal stables, Ferdinand Meyer (1808–1864), a widower with three children. He acknowledged the king's two illegitimate sons by his wife (both born during the course of the marriage) as his own.

On 14 November 1849 in Liège, Meyer gave birth to a son, George Georges-Frédéric Ferdinand Meyer (1849–1904). In 1850, she moved to Wiesbaden, Electorate of Hesse to escape the public scrutiny that had grown unbearable. After the king's wife, Queen Louise (1812–1850) died, Meyer returned to Brussels in 1851 and started to conduct herself and her affair more discreetly. She moved out of the house on the Rue Royale and bought the Château of Stuyvenberg with the king's financial aid. Her new home was closer to the royal family's residence, the Palace of Laeken, and Leopold visited her and their children almost every day. On 25 September 1852, Meyer had a second son, Arthur von Eppinghoven (1852–1940).

The relationship of Arcadie Claret/Meyer and King Leopold lasted until his death on 10 December 1865, for 20 to 23 years. The king wanted to secure the position and livelihood of his mistress and children after his death. In 1851, he sold Meyer an estate in Monheim am Rhein, Kingdom of Prussia with a house and 170 hectares (420 acres) of land. The estate had previously been the farm of the nearby abbey called Eppinghoven. King Leopold wanted to bestow a title on his unofficial family and create them barons of Eppinghoven, which the Belgian parliament refused to approve. In the end, in 1862, Leopold's nephew, Ernest II, Duke of Saxe-Coburg-Gotha granted the hereditary title to two sons, and in 1863 to their mother, too. Arcadie and Ferdinand Meyer separated in 1861.

=== Later life ===
The Baroness d'Eppinghoven had started building a castle in Monheim am Rhein in 1862, where she retired following the death of the king, seeing that she was no longer welcome in Belgium. She died on 13 January 1897, 31 years after Leopold I.

Claret's two sons

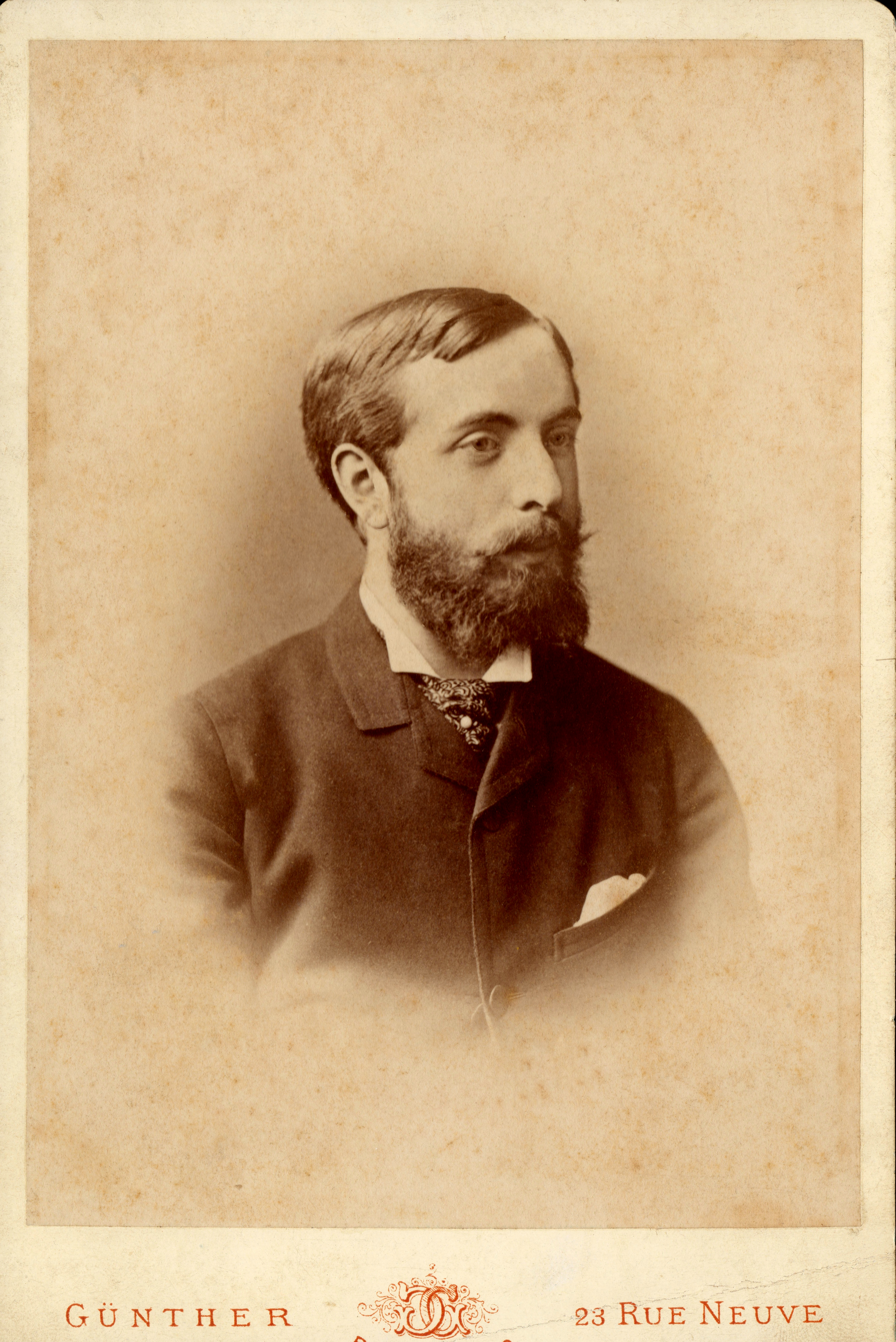
Georges-Frédéric

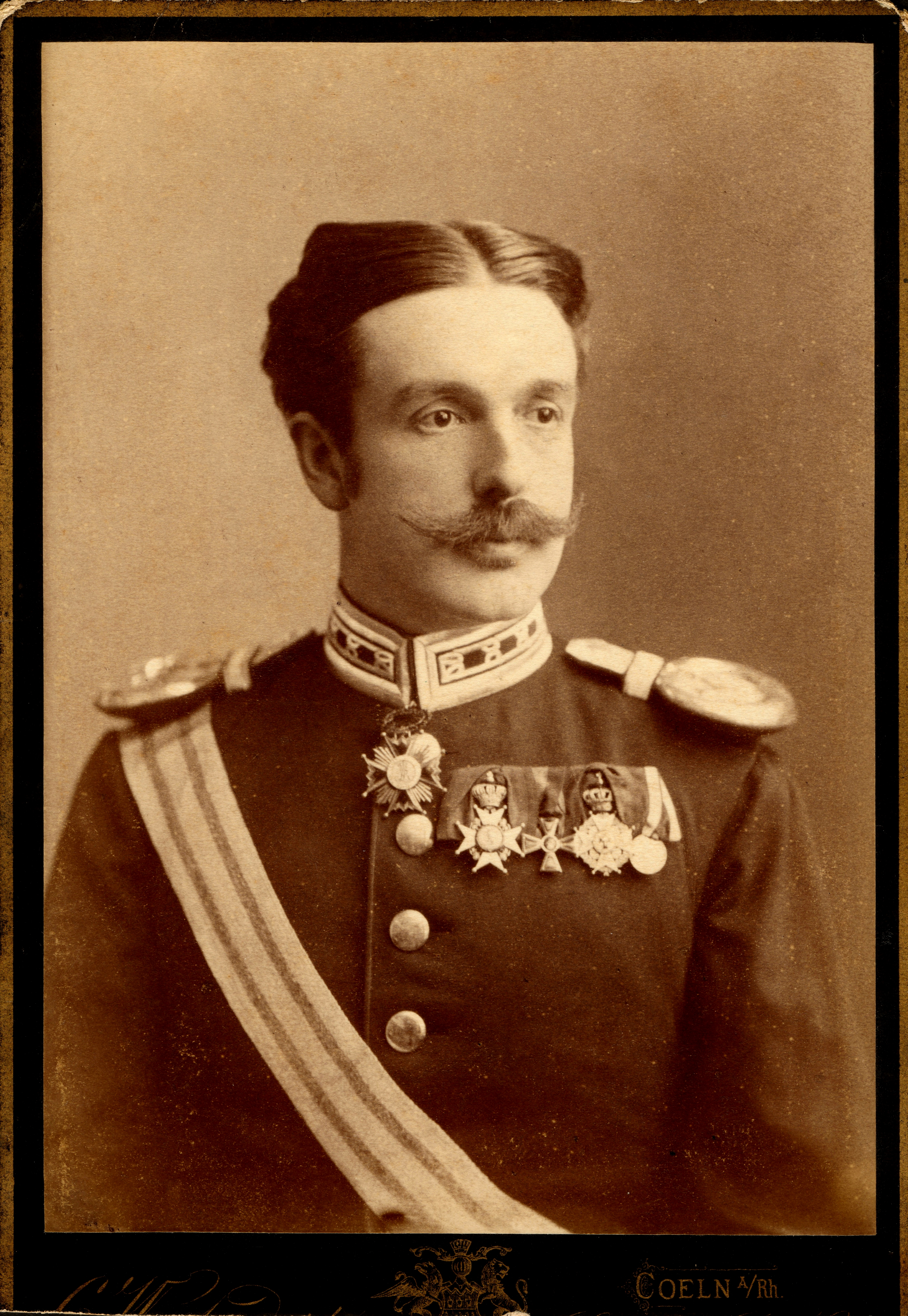
Arthur

== Issue ==
- Georges-Frédéric Ferdinand Meyer, Baron von Eppinghoven (14 November 1849 – 3 February 1904);
- Christian-Frédéric Arthur Baron d'Eppinghoven (25 September 1852 – 9 November 1940).
