= International Association of Department Stores =

Retail trade association founded in 1928

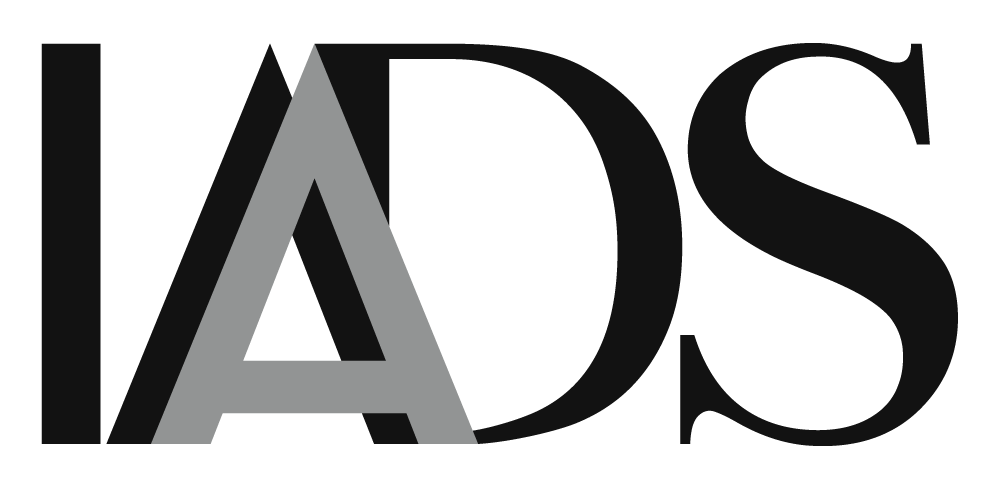
- Abbreviation: IADS
- Formation: 1928; 98 years ago
- Founder: Emile Bernheim, Pierre Laguionie, Ragnar Sachs, Frank Chitham, Sven Bögelund-Jensen
- Type: Retail trade association
- Headquarters: Paris, France
- Managing Director: Selvane Mohandas du Ménil
- Website: www.iads.org

The International Association of Department Stores (IADS) is a retail trade association founded in 1928 by a group of department stores with the goal of introducing modern management methods derived from the scientific management movement to their retail format.

== History ==
In the middle of the 1920s, American management theories, such as the scientific management of F. W. Taylor, started spreading in Europe. The International Management Institute (I.M.I.) was established in Geneva in 1927 to facilitate the diffusion of such ideas.

Edward Filene, a member of the I.M.I. Board of Directors and Chairman of Filene's department store in Boston, decided—with Emile Bernheim of Innovation in Brussels (later known as Galeria Inno), Pierre Laguionie of the Printemps in Paris and Ragnar Sachs of Nordiska Kompaniet in Stockholm—to apply I.M.I.'s teachings about scientific management to the department store retail format. They created the Association of Department Stores in Paris in 1928 under the supervision of the first General Secretary Werner Kaufmann, and were joined the same year by Harrods of London and Magasin du Nord of Copenhagen.

According to James B. Jefferys, the interest of the IADS was first its limited scope, with memberships restricted to one per country to promote cooperation, and second its scientific approach, through methods laid out by one of the early General Secretaries of the IADS, Dr Hrant Pasdermadjian (1936–1954) (although his approach was severely judged in America). During his tenure, Pasdermadjian published scientific manuals on the different department store functions, as well as his book on department stores. His successor for 30 years, Dr James B. Jefferys, continued the task of bringing management research to department stores and continued publishing works on retailing.

After Kaufmann, Hermann Maria Spitzer, Pasdermadjian and Jefferys, Erik Kalderen, of Sweden's Nordiska Kompaniet department store, became its first secretary, serving in that role for five years. He was followed by Maarten de Groot van Embden for 25 years, Armelle Mesguich for five years, and most recently Selvane Mohandas du Menil, who took office part way through the 2020 COVID-19 pandemic, during which most stores were under lockdown. There have been eight general managers in the 85 years between 1936 and 2025.

As of 2025, IADS is the fifth oldest retail association in the world, after the Australian Retail Association (founded 1903), the National Retail Federation in the United States (founded 1911), the Austrian Retail Association (founded 1921) and the German Retail Federation.

== Operation and membership ==
IADS shares retail management experience and best practices, through meetings for CEOs, main functions at senior level in the member companies, findings within product categories and private labels dissemination of information and reports about department stores, and statistical and other surveys and consultancy on specific issues as requested by member companies, such as the increasing competition coming from online retail channels. The Association also shares insights on the evolution of markets, such as Mexico, India or China, industry-related events such as the formation of new conglomerates or the impact of large scale events on retail, including by making public statements. Finally it also contributes to disseminating knowledge about department stores in the world by collaborating with cultural institutions.

The membership has varied from 4 to 25 companies, with an increasingly greater internationalisation. Since the 1990s it has included members from Asia and the Americas such as Beijing Hualian Group, The Mall Group, and Falabella.

As of 2026, 17 department store companies are members of the association, operating in 28 countries. The member companies are:

- Almacenes Simán (El Salvador)
- Beijing Hualian Group (China)
- Bloomingdale's (United States)
- Boyner (Turkey)
- Breuninger (Germany)
- Centro Beco (Venezuela)
- Chalhoub Group (UAE)
- El Corte Inglés (Spain)
- El Palacio de Hierro (Mexico)
- Falabella (Chile)
- Galeries Lafayette (France)
- John Lewis (UK)
- Lifestyle International PLC (Sogo) (Hong Kong)
- Magasin du Nord (Denmark)
- Manor (Switzerland)
- The Mall Group (Thailand)
- TsUM Kyiv (Ukraine)
