= Breuninger =

German retailer

Logo

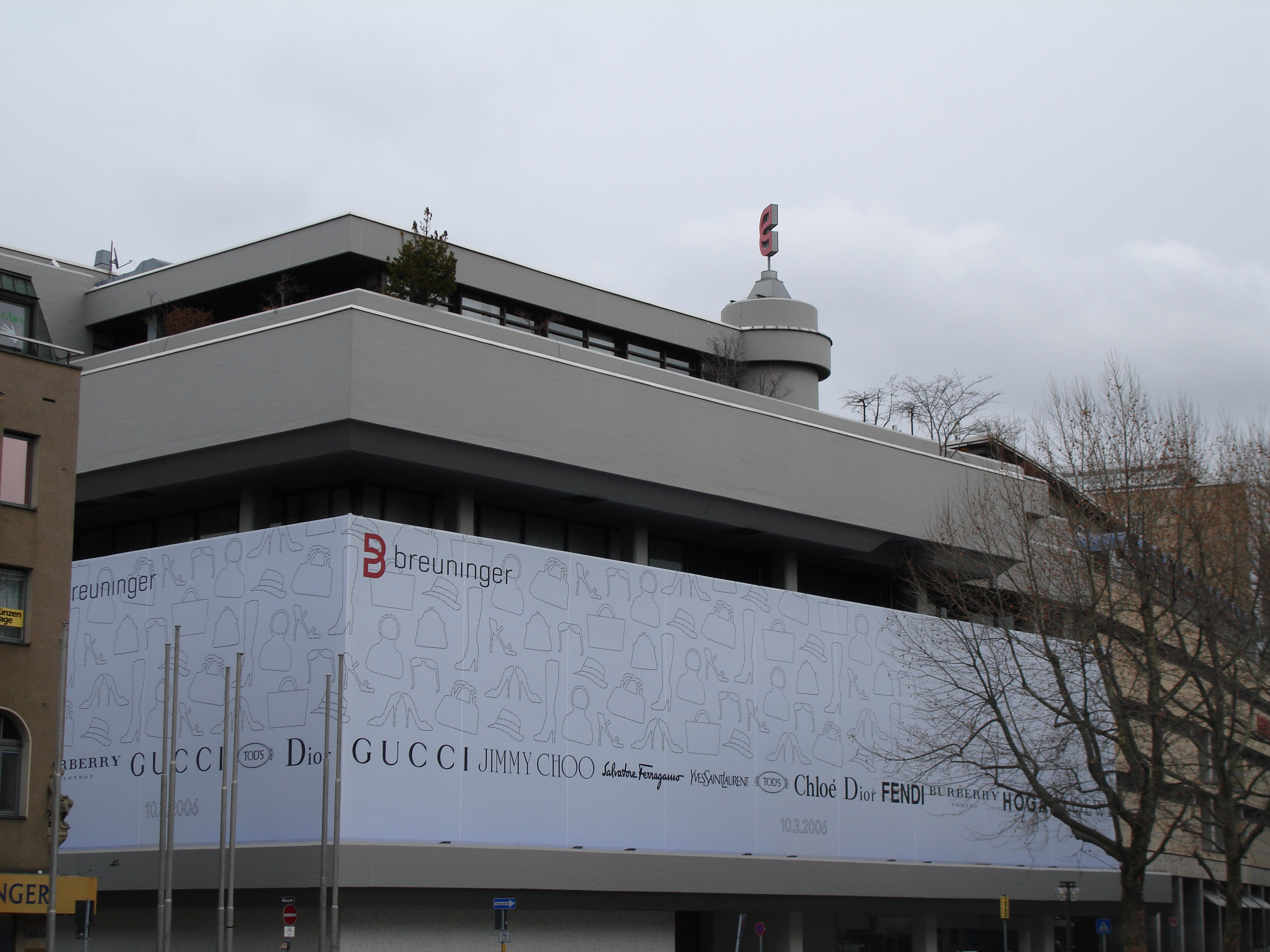
Breuninger head office outlet, Stuttgart

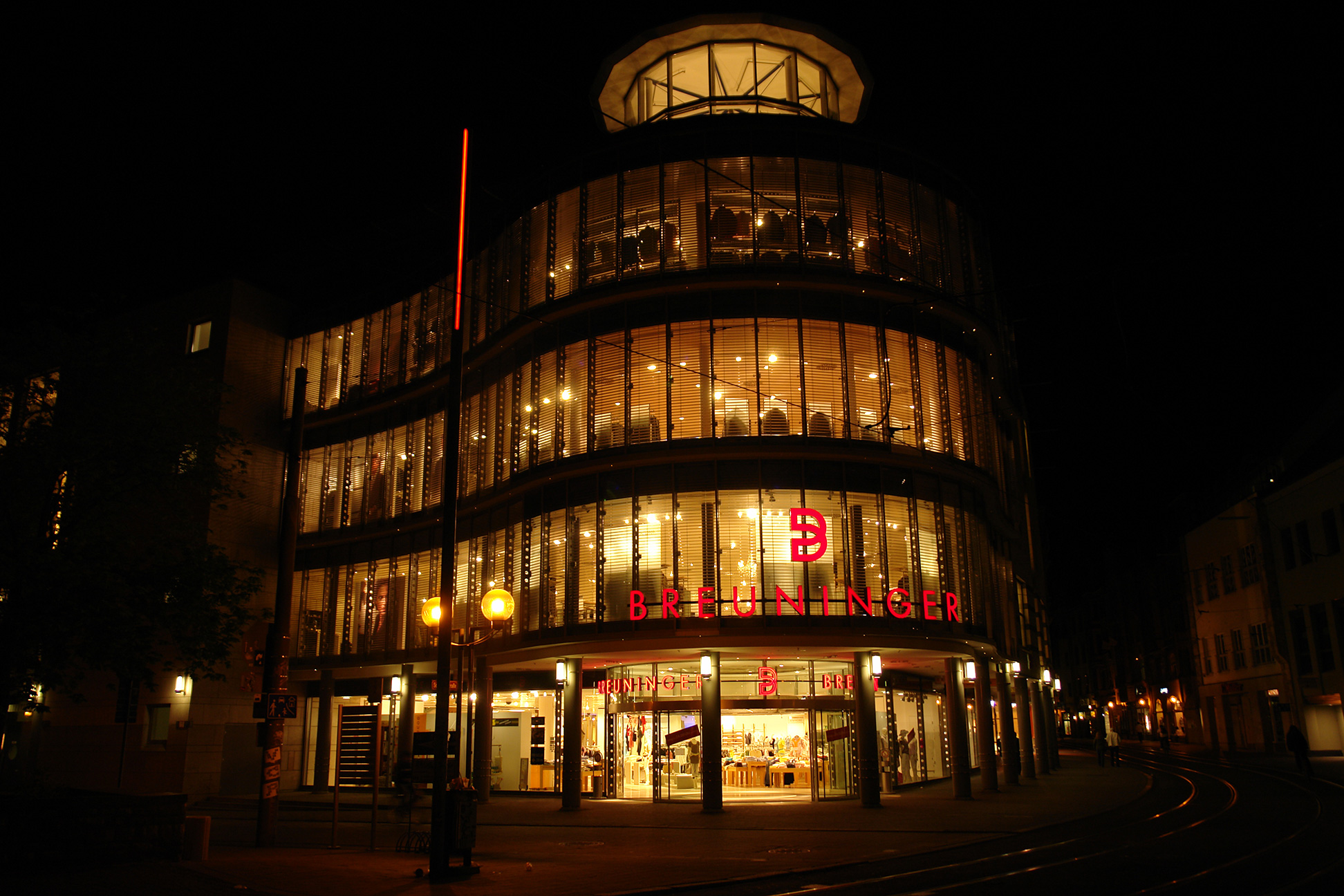
Breuninger in Erfurt

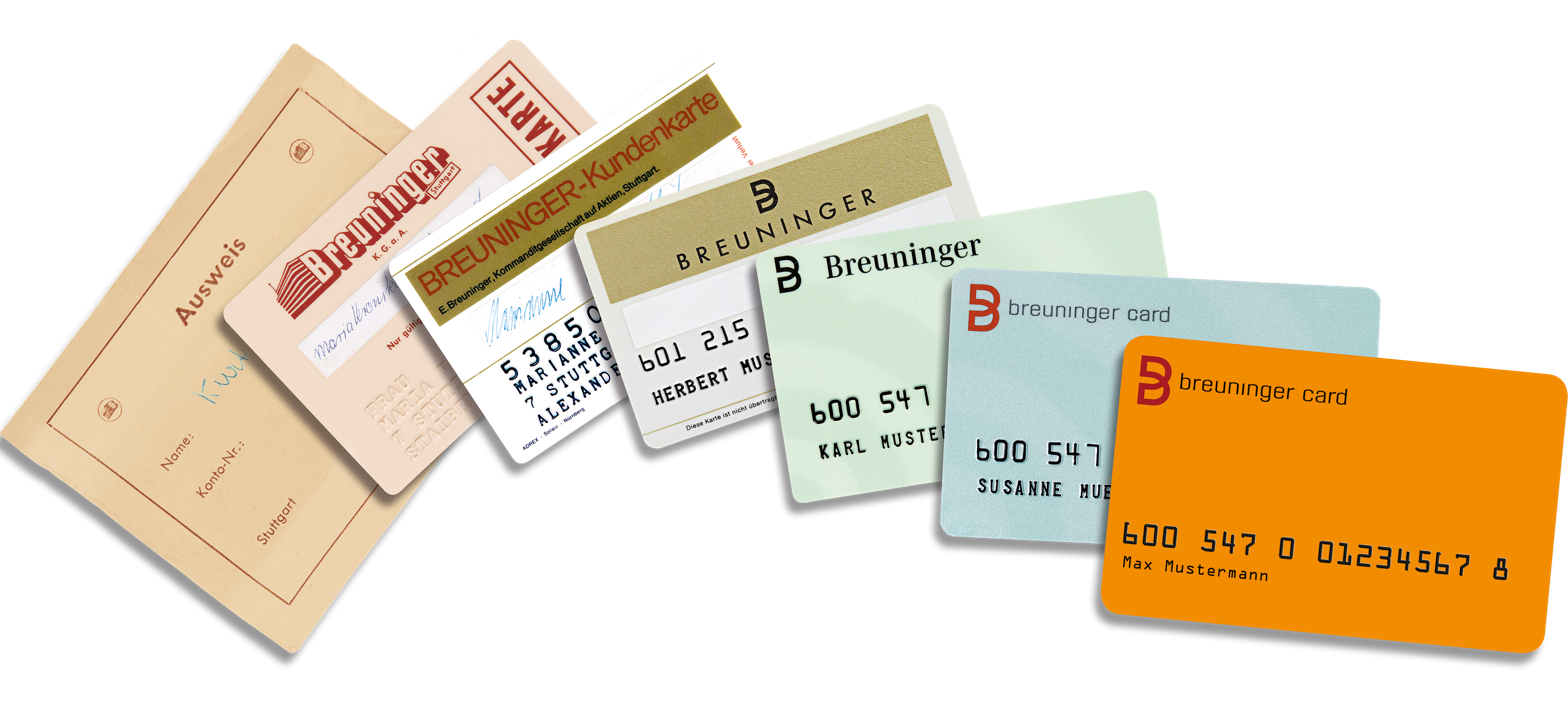
Evolution of the Breuninger customer card from 1959 to 2018. Breuniger was the first German retail store to provide a customer loyalty card in 1959

E. Breuninger GmbH & Co., is a Stuttgart-based German department store retailer trading under the name Breuninger. Targeted predominantly at up-market shoppers, the Breuninger range is mainly restricted to fashion, clothing and premium household goods. Breuninger has been a member of the International Association of department stores since 1987.

== Headquarters ==
Breuninger was founded in 1881 on the same site it occupies today at the centre of Stuttgart on Marktplatz (market square). This head office outlet now covers 35,000 sq m and is one of the largest of its kind in the whole of Germany. In terms of privately owned department stores, Breuninger's head office outlet in Stuttgart is the second largest in Europe (after Harrods).

The shop facade is known for its simplicity and austere appearance, in stark contrast to other premium department stores.

In 1989, the company's head office outlet in Stuttgart was extended such that it now embraces a pedestrian zone which runs through the centre of the shop and is still open to the public after closing.

== Department stores ==
Breuninger is a household name in the Federal State of Baden-Württemberg – beyond that it has gradually expanded its presence to other major German cities in the past 2 decades.

- Erfurt
- Freiburg im Breisgau (through acquisition of Schneider)
- Karlsruhe (through acquisition of Schneider)
- Leipzig
- Ludwigsburg (part of a major shopping centre called Breuningerland, co-managed with Unibail-Rodamco-Westfield Germany)
- Nürnberg
- Reutlingen
- Sindelfingen (part of a major shopping centre called Breuningerland, co-managed with Unibail-Rodamco-Westfield Germany)
- Stuttgart
- Sulzbach (in the Frankfurt Main-Taunus-Zentrum shopping centre)
- Düsseldorf (opened in 2014 in the new Kö-Bogen complex at the north end of the Königsallee)
- München (Through the acquisition of Konen in 2022)
- Luxembourg (Through the acquisition of Konen in 2022. Konen owns Bram department store in Luxembourg, effectively renamed as Bram by Breuninger following acquisition)
- Überseequartier (2023, part of a major shopping centre called Westfield Hamburg-Überseequartier)

== History ==
The first Breuninger department store, now referred to as its head office outlet, was established in 1881 by Eduard Breuninger in Stuttgart after taking over the house of E.L. Ostermayer on Marktplatz. Within years Breuninger had extended the shopping area to the upper floors of the building. In 1888, Breuninger moved his premises to a building in nearby Münzstraße but the lack of space forced him to use both houses for selling again.

By 1903 the building had to be replaced by larger premises and after a further two rounds of expansion, in 1931 Breuninger was operating on the new site on Marktstraße.

On his death in 1931 the company passed into the hands of Eduard's son, Alfred .

Bombing during World War II wreaked havoc on all premises owned by the retailer. With the death of Alfred in 1947, the company passed into the 3rd generation. Heinz Breuninger took many years to return the retailer to its former glory.

In 1952, the company launched its Breuni bear mascot which is still used in marketing campaigns today and is a favourite among children.

In the 1960s Breuninger underwent a transition from a purveyor of textiles to a broader scale department store. The number of customers visiting the store from outside Stuttgart had been declining for years so the retailer expanded its range to adapt to changing demands.

Expansion took a further new turn in the 1970s with new stores outside Stuttgart. The first "Breuningerland", a major multi-store shopping centre also encompassing sublets, was opened in Ludwigsburg to the north of Stuttgart in 1973. In 1980 a second Breuningerland was built in Sindelfingen to the south of Stuttgart. Both sites continue to make a major contribution to company sales.

In the 1970s, the owner at the time, Heinz Breuninger started to groom the newly appointed Willem G. van Agtmael as his successor. Heinz Breuninger died in 1980 at the age of 60 at which point van Agtmael took over at the helm. Van Agtmael forged ahead with expansion plans with the first Breuninger outlets after the fall of the Berlin Wall in Dresden and Leipzig. Nine other outlets have been opened since this time.

Since March 2006 the company has been operating its head office outlet as a flagship store in an attempt to position the shop as a luxury outlet on a par with Harrods of London.

A number of outlets had to be closed in 2006 due to poor sales, including the store in Würzburg. The Breuninger store in Dresden was subsequently closed down in February 2008.

== Store trivia, firsts, criticism ==
- Breuninger was one of the first German outlets to install lifts and elevators in the 1950s.
- In 1959 Breuninger was the first German retailer to introduce a loyalty card. The card is still in use today.
- The company was the first retailer in Germany to provide a multi-storey car park, based on trends in America.
- Since the 1920s company staff working on the shop floor have been obliged to wear clothing in white, black or grey.
- In late 2006 Breuninger was the target of animal rights activists demonstrating against the sale of furs and fashion shows with models wearing fur. In January 2021, Breuninger joined the international Fur Free Retailer Program.
