= Ji Xiao'an =

- Born: August 1, 1957 (age 68)
- Occupation: Businessman

Ji Xiao'an (Chinese: 吉小安; born August 1957) is the chairman of the board of the Beijing Hualian Group. In addition to being chairman of Beijing Hualian, he also has ties to the National Industrial Development Co., Ltd. in Hainan, the Group Investment Holdings Ltd., and the Hualianxin Comprehensive Supermarket Co., Ltd. in Beijing of which he is the incumbent chairman.
