= Château of Stuyvenberg =

Belgian royal residence in Brussels

- Château du Stuyvenberg (French); Kasteel van Stuyvenberg (Dutch); Schloss Stuyvenberg (German)
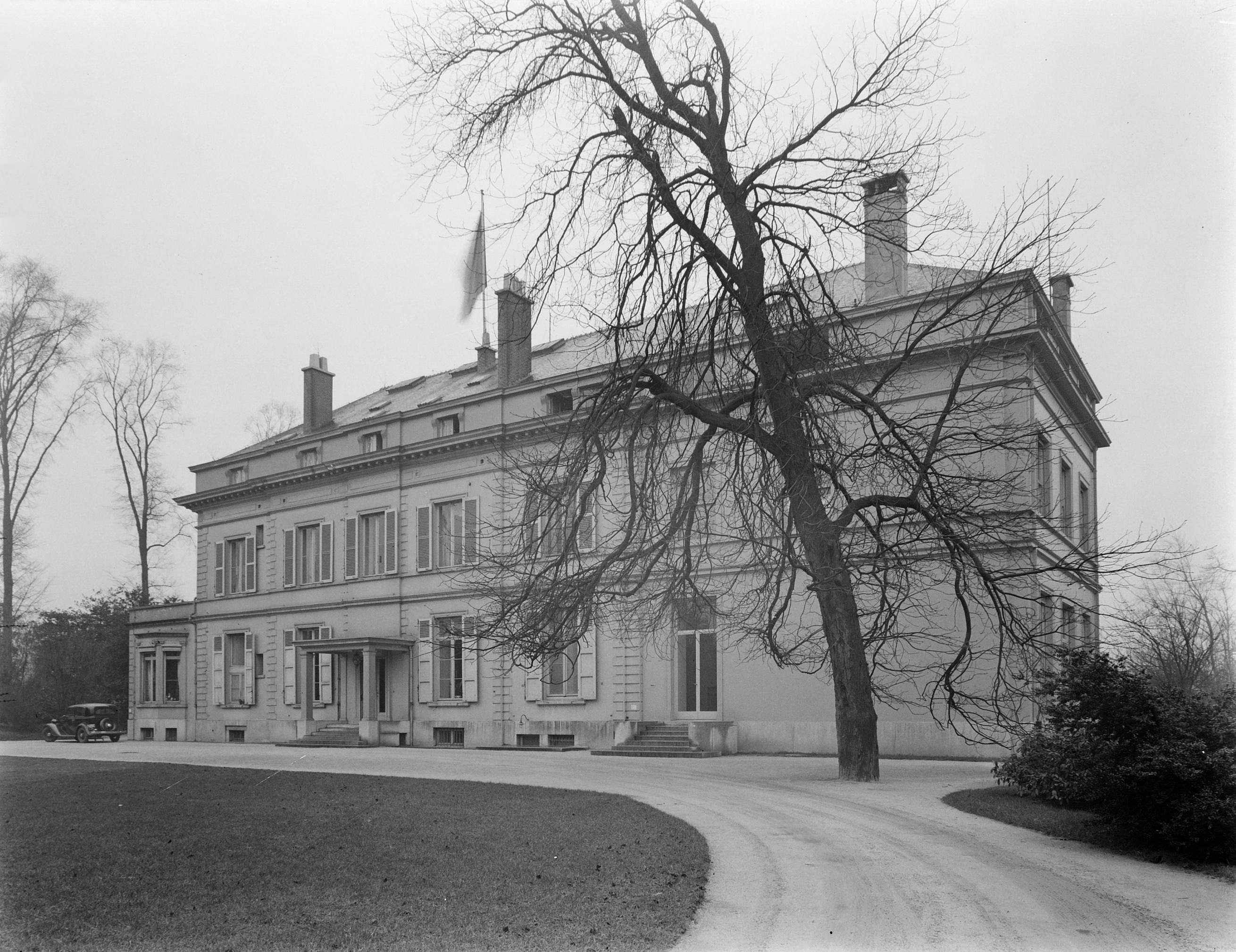
- The Château of Stuyvenberg in 1934
- Interactive map of the Château of Stuyvenberg area

General information
- Type: Château
- Architectural style: Neoclassical
- Location: 1020 Laeken, City of Brussels, Brussels-Capital Region, Belgium
- Coordinates: 50°53′16″N 4°20′54″E

The Château of Stuyvenberg (French: Château du Stuyvenberg; Dutch: Kasteel van Stuyvenberg; German: Schloss Stuyvenberg) is a residence of the Belgian royal family in Laeken, in the north-west of the City of Brussels. It is near the Royal Palace of Laeken, the official residence of the King and Queen of the Belgians. Another nearby residence, the Villa Schonenberg, is home to Princess Astrid, the sister of the current king, Philippe.

== History ==
The Château of Stuyvenberg was built in 1725, acquired for 200,000 Belgian francs by the Belgian state in 1840, and later bought by King Leopold II, who donated it to the Belgian Royal Trust. The first Belgian king, Leopold I, used the château for his mistress Arcadie Claret, and their second child Arthur was born there in 1852.

Later, it was the birthplace of King Baudouin in 1930 and King Albert II in 1934; both spent their early years at Stuyvenberg. After World War II, Elisabeth of Bavaria, widow of King Albert I, lived at the château until her death in 1965. Subsequently, it was used for almost three decades as a guest house for foreign dignitaries. From 1998 to 2014, Queen Fabiola, widow of King Baudouin, called it her home. She died at Stuyvenberg on 5 December 2014. The château then stood empty for three years until the Royal Trust rented it out via Sotheby's to a private couple in 2017.

== See also ==
- List of castles and châteaux in Belgium
- Neoclassical architecture in Belgium
- History of Brussels
- Culture of Belgium
- Belgium in the long nineteenth century
