= The Indian Water Lilies =

Indoor automatic puppet show at Efteling

The Indian Water Lilies (or "De Indische Waterlelies" in Dutch) is an indoor automatic puppet show in Efteling amusement park in the Netherlands. It was designed by Anton Pieck and opened its doors in 1966.

== History and details ==
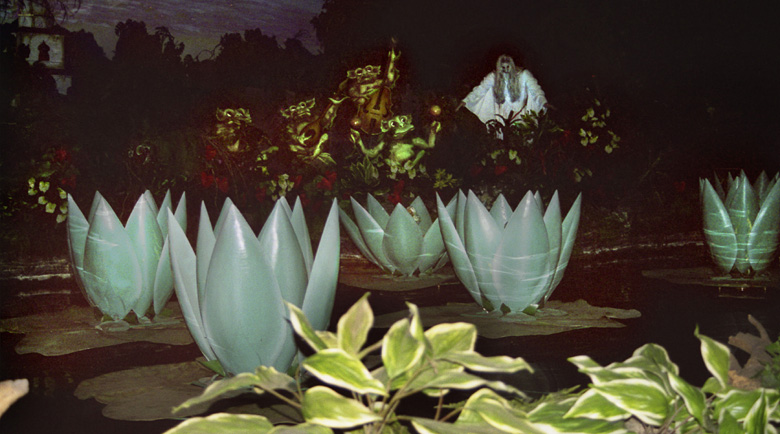
The witch's chant brings out the fairies

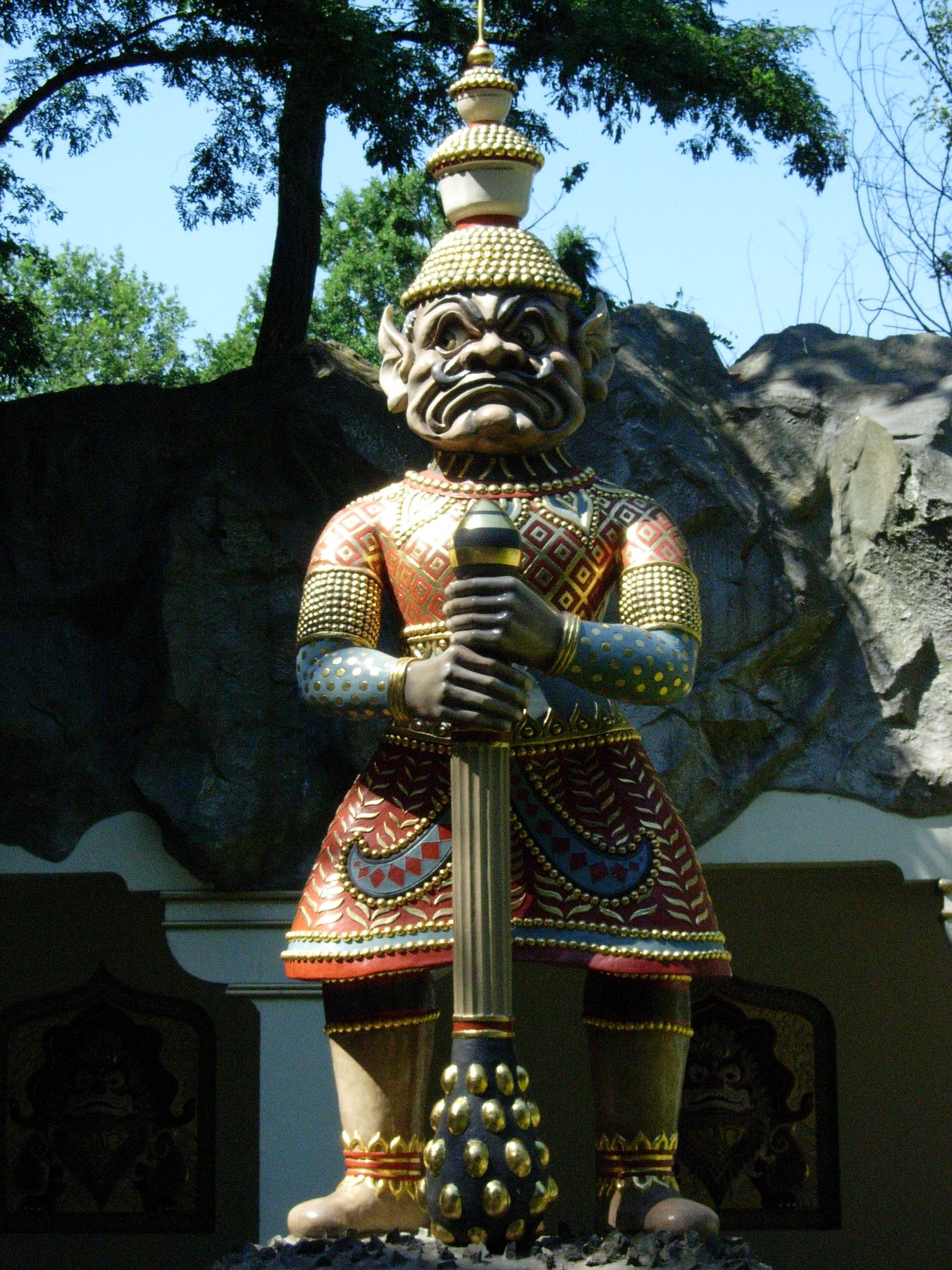
One of the two Indrajit Temple Guards

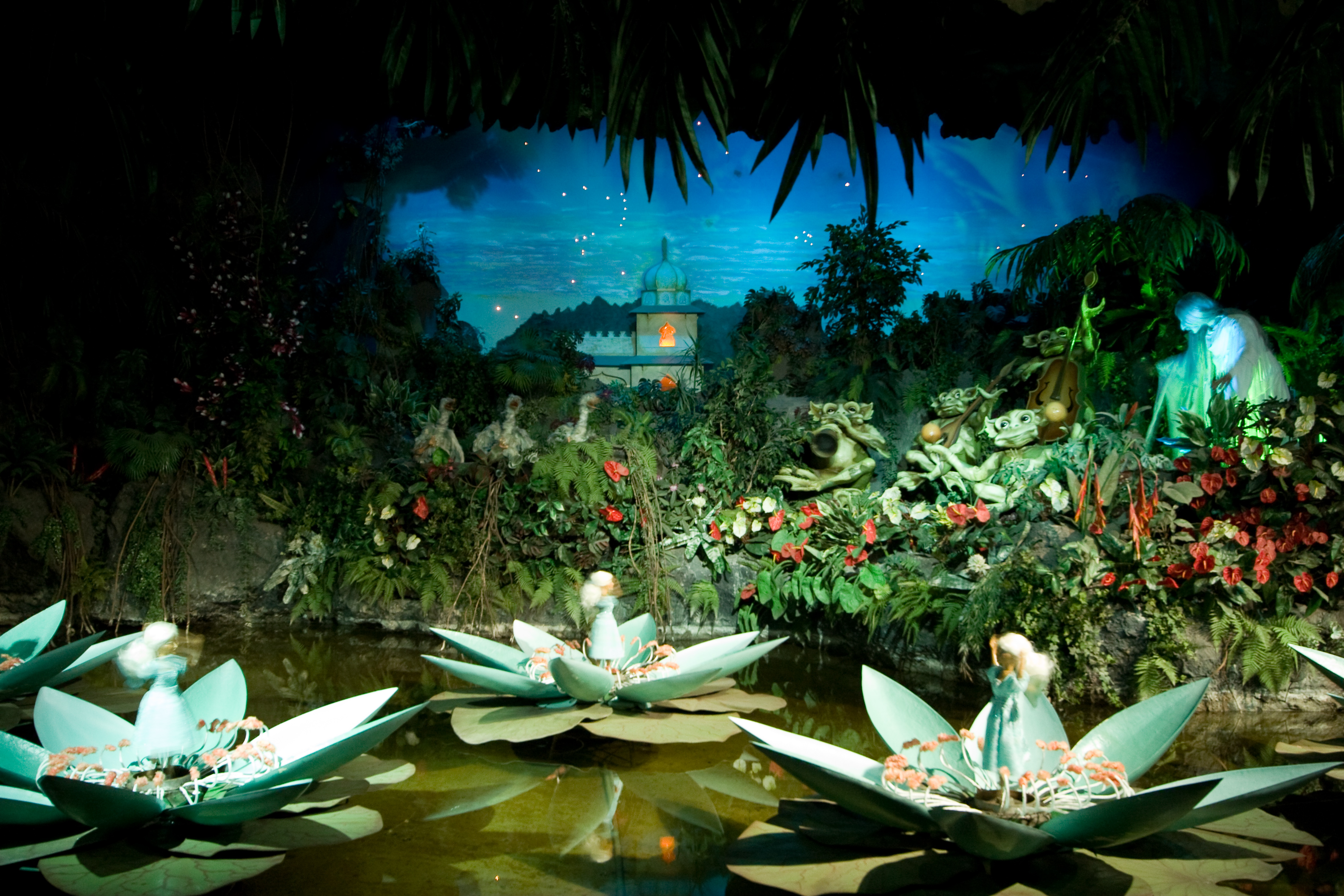
The Frog orchestra kicks in

Although The Indian Water Lilies is indoors, it is not a real dark ride, that is; there is no transport system but visitors have to walk into the show area to view the 3-dimensional tale. It was the first attraction in the Efteling that used advanced techniques to create an artificial, fairy-tale style environment. The consistency and style of the music, lighting, decorations and animatronics can be found in many other Efteling rides built later, like Spookslot, Fata Morgana and Droomvlucht. Peter Reijnders was responsible for the technical details and in the final phase of the construction the newly graduated industrial engineer Ton van de Ven participated in the project as manager of design and decoration.

The theme is based on one of the twelve stories in the book "Los doce cuentos maravillosos", written by Queen Fabiola of Belgium in 1955 (before her marriage with King Baudouin of Belgium).
Peter Reijnders, for whom this would be his last contribution to the park before retiring, wanted to create this ride to commemorate the 15th anniversary of the Efteling and went to the Royal Castle of Laeken at Laken for an audience (1962) with the queen. The Belgian queen agreed to let the Efteling use her story, on the condition that a contribution to charity would be made.
The Belgian ambassador, present during the opening in 1966 stated: “an artistic and technical wonder beyond all my expectations”; queen Fabiola told Peter Reijnders a year later that she was “extremely enthusiastic”.

The tale, in short, by the famous Flemish cartoonist Willy Vandersteen (1978): “Far away in the Indian jungle, there lies a small and mysterious lake. When the moon rises, big and yellow, to the sky, the moon goddess and hundreds of stars come down to dance on the lake. They dance, all night long, to the chants of a witch who is standing beside the waterfall. With dawn, the moon goddess claps her hands and all of them must return to the skies. But one night, seven stars continued to dance. They suffered heavily for their disobedience: the witch had them in her power and changed them into fairies, forcing them to dance on the water-lilies forever.”
The ride starts with such a short tale, told by Barbara Hofman.

Size of complex: 2.5 acres (10,000 m^{2})
Cost: € 180,000 (66% overspend)
Capacity: 800 (estimate) per hour
Complete renovation in 1996/ 1997 (30th anniversary) of the building, square, cavern and decorations, as well as an update of the mechanisms of the animatronics.

== The show ==
The show is built on Indian Temple Square with a large fountain, Indian decorations and 2 Yaksha giants. This mixture of Indian and Thai elements could be a reference to Wat Phra Kaew. A large door behind the fountain gives access to a dark cavern where a large corridor leads to the scene of the jungle lake, enclosed by tropical plants, a creek and a waterfall. The singing of the witch begins the show; she summons the fairies to dance on the water-lilies of the lake, guided by the music of an orchestra of frogs and the song of geese. The frogs are the only part where the technology was bought; the rest of the ride was developed in-house.

== Music ==
The main music for the Indian Water-lilies is "Afrikaan Beat" by Bert Kaempfert, but before the show, the Inca chant "Taita Inty" (Virgin of the Sun God) is played, taken from the album Voice of the Xtabay (1950) by Yma Sumac. This strong South American interest could well have been of influence on the theming of the Piraña.
