= Beijing Hualian Group =

Retail company based in Beijing

Beijing Hualian Group Investment Holding Co., Ltd. 北京华联集团投资控股有限公司
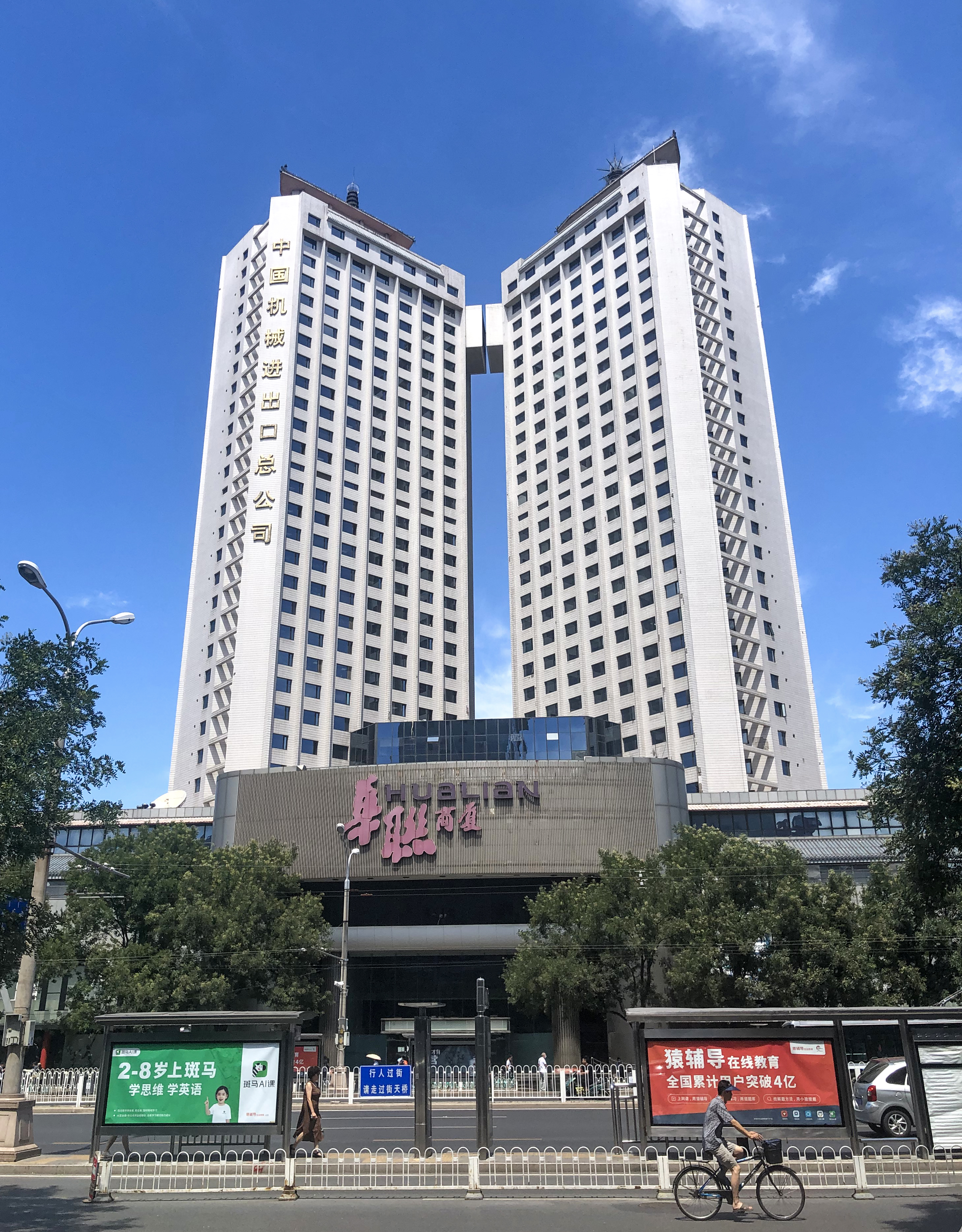
- Headquarters of BHG
- Industry: Retail
- Founded: 1998; 28 years ago
- Website: www.beijing-hualian.com

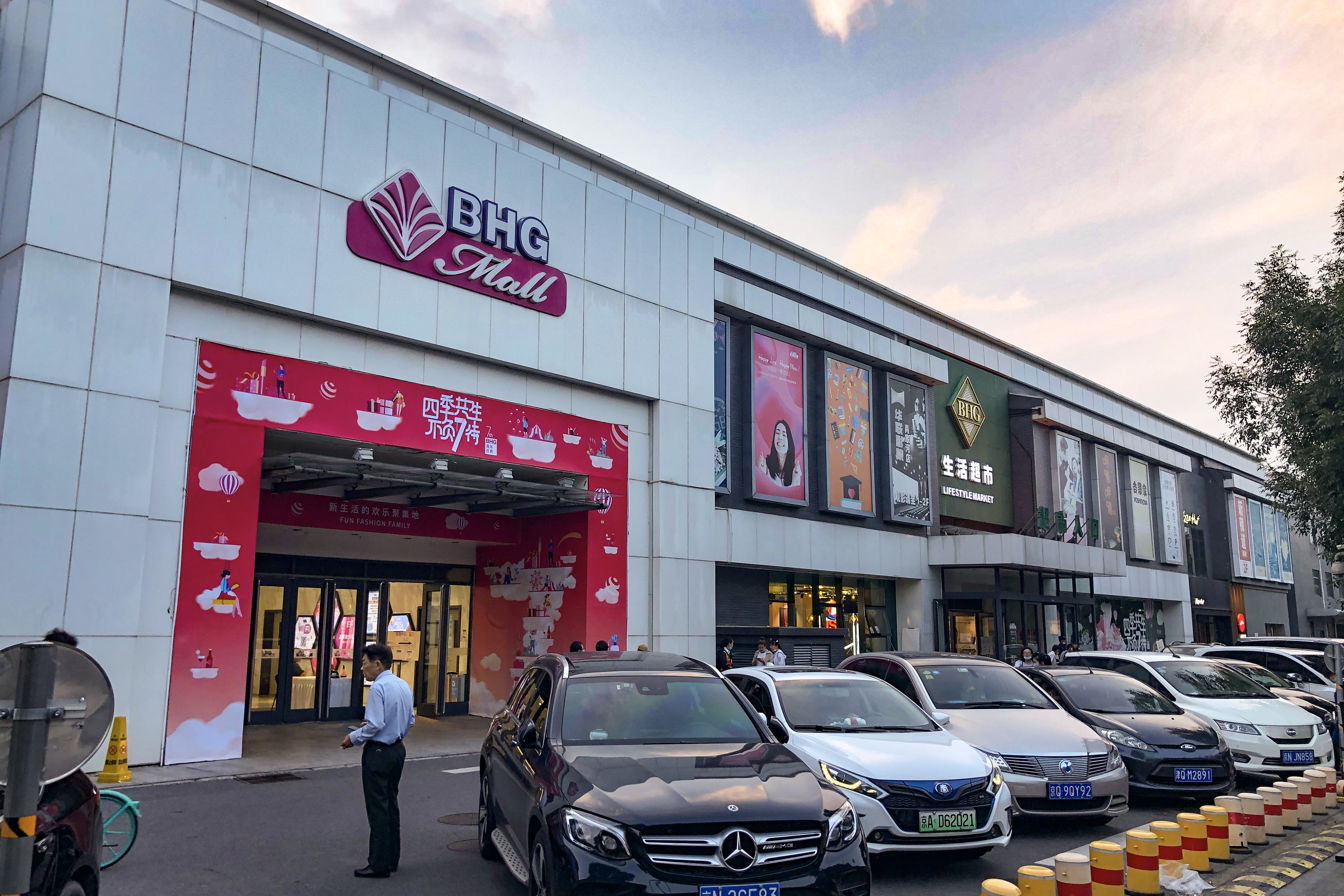
BHG Mall near [[Anheqiao West station]], Beijing

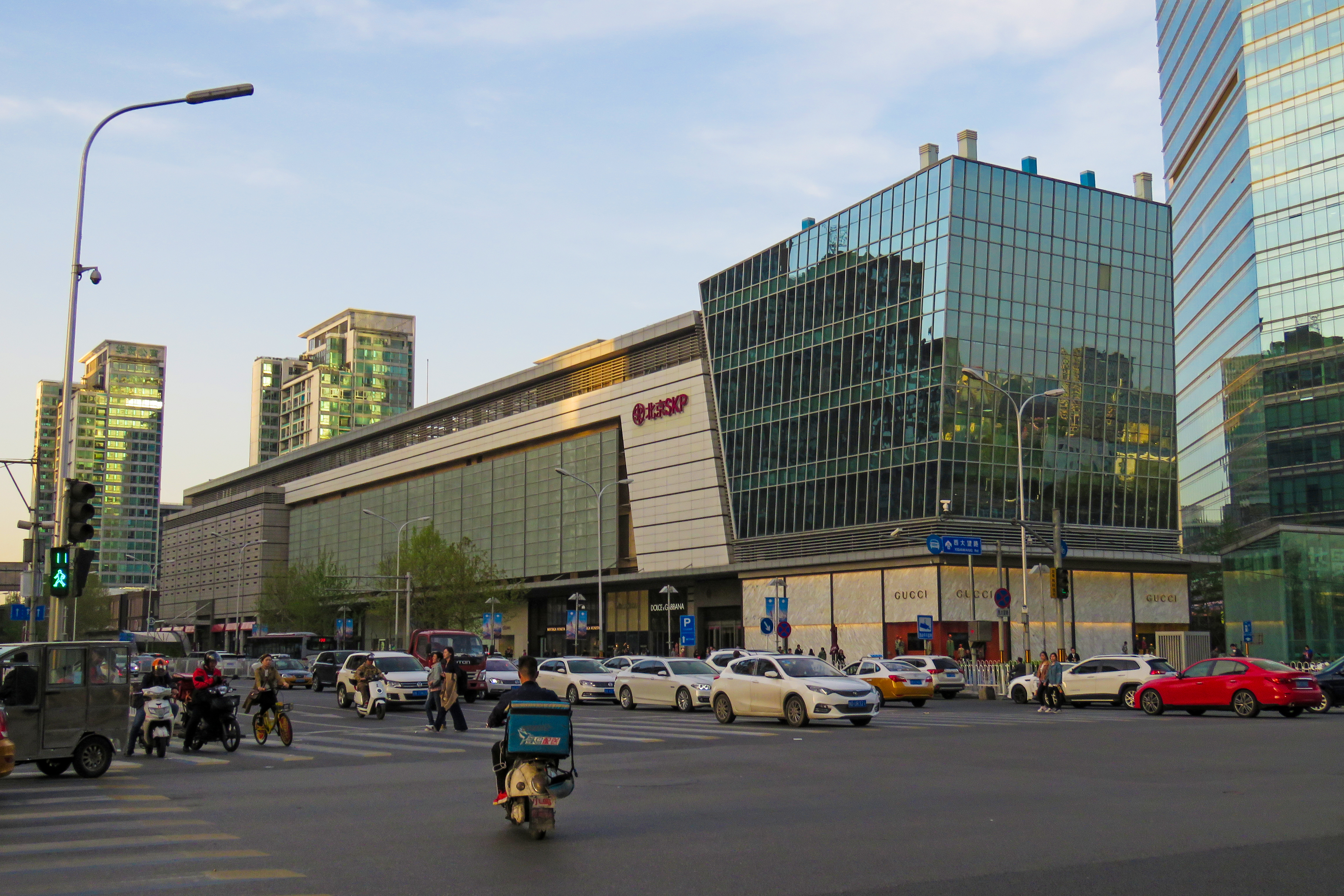
SKP Beijing, a luxury mall under Beijing Hualian Group

The Beijing Hualian Group (Chinese: 北京华联集团; pinyin: Běijīng Huálián Jítuán, using the trademark BHG) is a Chinese retailer founded in 1998, headquartered in Beijing. It is one of the fifteen large national retail enterprises supported by the Ministry of Commerce and the only Chinese retail enterprise member of the International Department Store Association. Headed by Ji Xiao An the chairman of the board of the Beijing Hualian Group, the group's main activities include the operation of supermarkets and department stores, as well as the sale of general merchandise, textiles, daily-use products and fresh fruits and vegetables. The group has been a member of the International Association of department stores since 2006.

== Brands ==
- BHG Lifestyle Market
- BHG Market Place
- BHG Mall
- SKP

== Singapore ==
In Singapore, it acquired Seiyu Group's three existing department stores such as Bugis Junction, Lot One and Junction 8 and has since renamed its stores to BHG Singapore from April 5, 2007.

BHG had opened its second outlet in Century Square in December 2007 after the previous tenant Metro moved out, although it was closed down on 13 August 2017. It was being replaced by new generation of stores.

As of 2026, BHG is located in the following locations:

- Bugis Junction (Flagship)

On 3 January 2022, BHG Raffles City was closed down after a temporary lease called One Assembly, which occupies the space previously occupied by Robinsons after the closure in December 2020. Also, BHG opened one store in Jurong Point on 1 September 2016, but had eventually closed down on 13 February 2022 citing COVID-19 losses. BHG Clementi Mall had closed down on 6 March 2022 as well. BHG also closed down its Lot One, Choa Chu Kang branch in 2023.

In 2025, BHG has closed down its Junction 8 outlet on 13 April and reduced its flagship store at Bugis Junction from three levels to two levels, while BHG had temporarily opened a new outlet at Tampines Mall from 21 November 2025 to 26 February 2026, known as BHG Select Pop-Up Store.
