= Emile Bernheim =

Belgian industrialist

Emile Bernheim (1886–1985) was a Belgian industrialist. For more than half a century he was the president of the store A l'innovation in Brussels, which he founded in 1897 in Brussels. Soon other stores followed in Liège (1899), Verviers (1900), Ghent (1900) and Antwerp (1906).

Besides being an entrepreneur he took several initiatives to support the arts and sciences. He founded the Bernheim Foundation, the Belgian Vocation Foundation and the Centre Emile Bernheim (CEB) at the Universite Libre de Bruxelles. He was also central in the creation of the International Association of Department Stores in 1928. He died at the age of 99.

== Sources ==
- Centre Emile Bernheim
- La Fondation Emile Bernheim (in French)
- Bernheim maakte innovation groot (Dutch)
