= Belgian Vocation Foundation =

Belgian non-profit organization

The Belgian Vocation Foundation is a Belgian non-profit organization, founded on 23 November 1963 by the Belgian industrialist Emile Bernheim. The foundation provides support to young people with a vocation, but who can not complete their education by lack of financial resources. Every year the Foundation awards 15 scholarships of 10,000 Euro each. Queen Fabiola is the patron of the Foundation.

== History ==
The idea for the foundation was first raised in 1960 by Marcel Bleustein-Blanchet, the founder of Publicis. Roger Forthomme, a Belgian journalist, succeeded in conveying his enthusiasms for the foundation to Emile Bernheim, who founded the Belgian Vocation Foundation in 1963.
