= Burraubach =

River in Germany

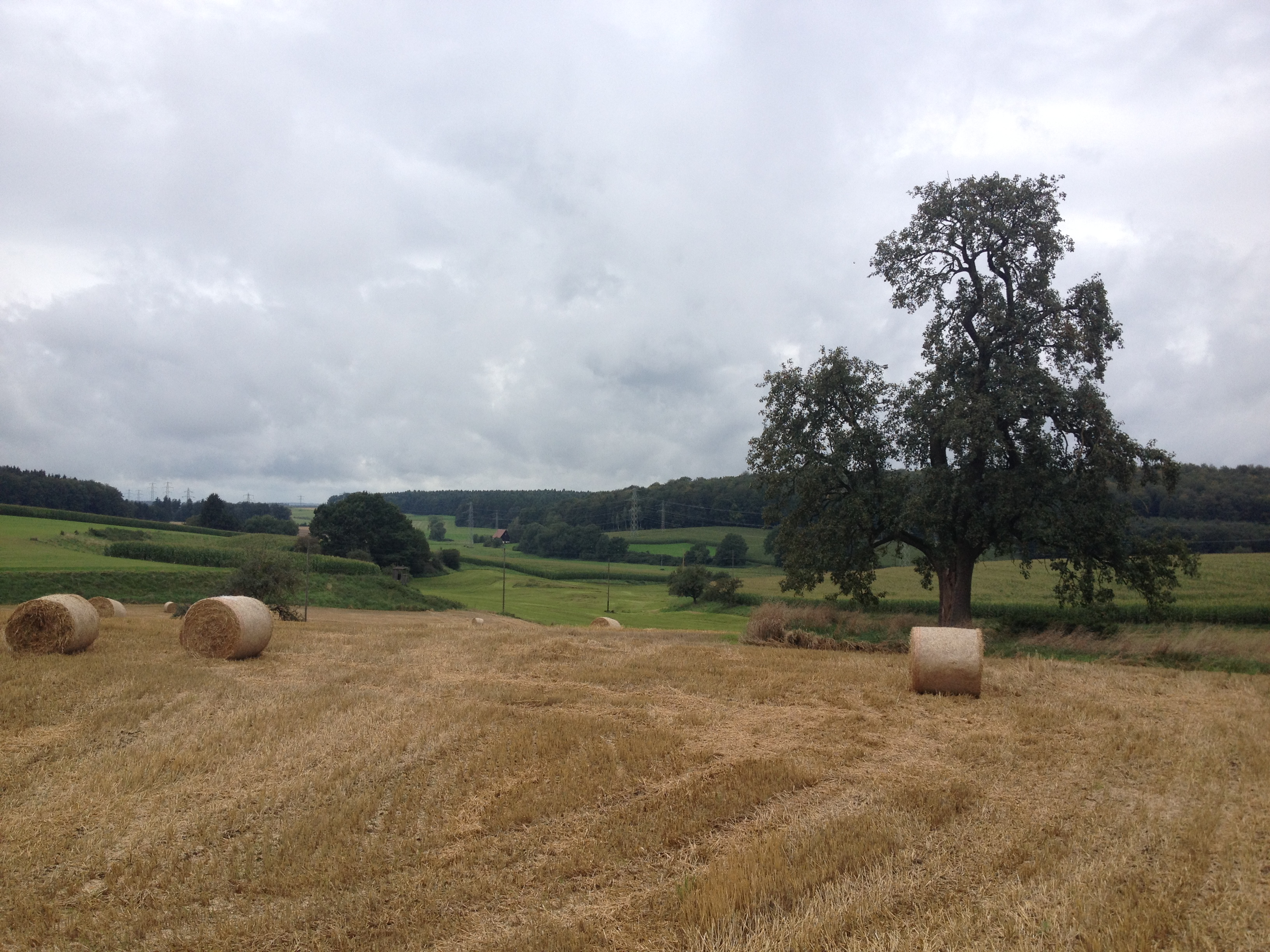
- Burraubach Valley

Location
- Country: Germany
- State: Baden-Württemberg

Physical characteristics
- Mouth
  - location: Kehlbach
  - coordinates: 47.9491°N 9.2259°E
- Length: 5.7 km (3.5 mi)

Basin features
- Progression: Kehlbach→ Andelsbach→ Ablach→ Danube→ Black Sea

The Burraubach is a river in the Sigmaringen district in Baden-Württemberg, Germany. It flows for about 5.7 kilometres. It flows into the Kehlbach near Pfullendorf.

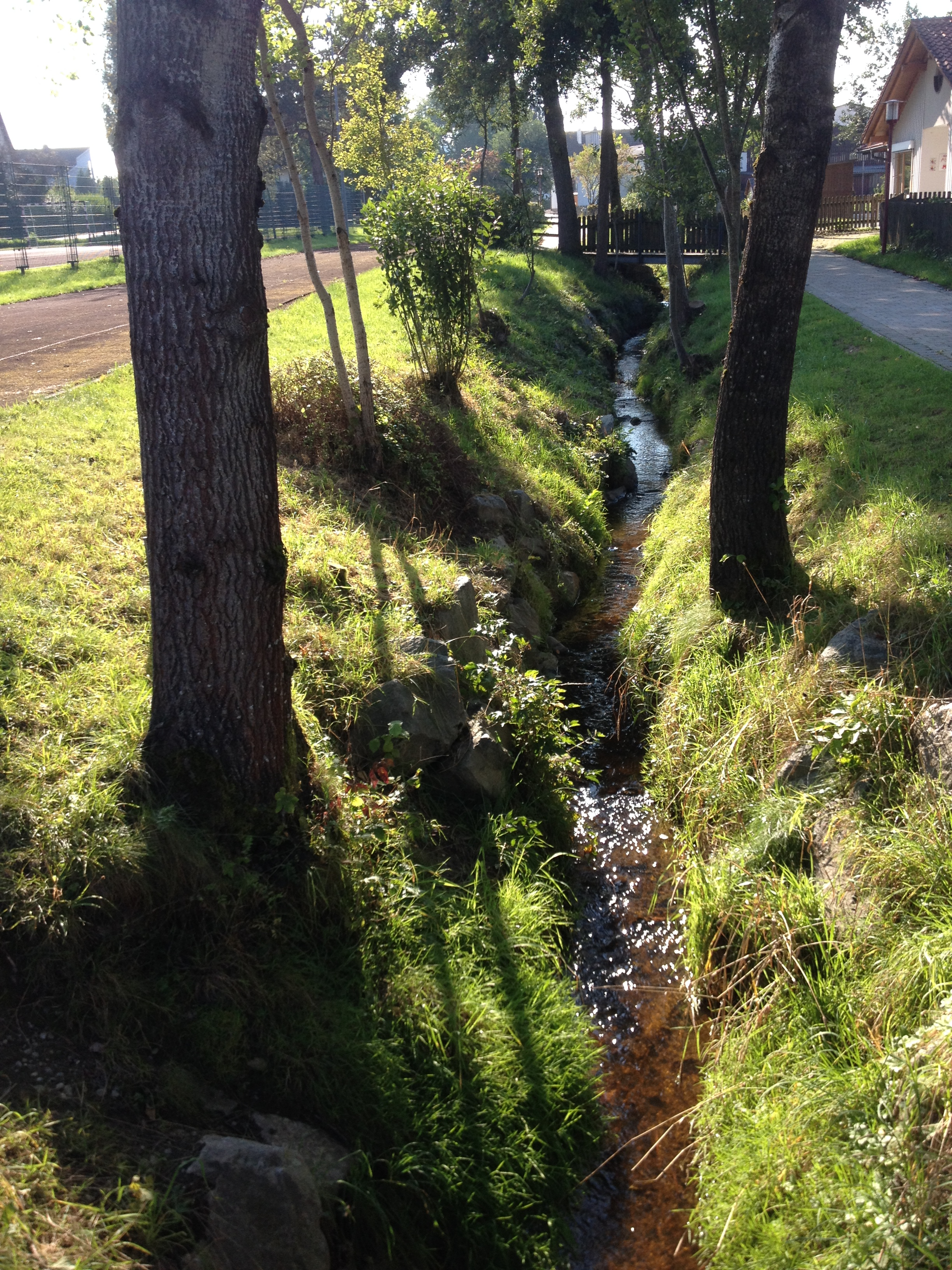
The Burraubach in Wald

== See also ==
- List of rivers of Baden-Württemberg
