= Mettenbach (Grabenbach) =

River in Germany

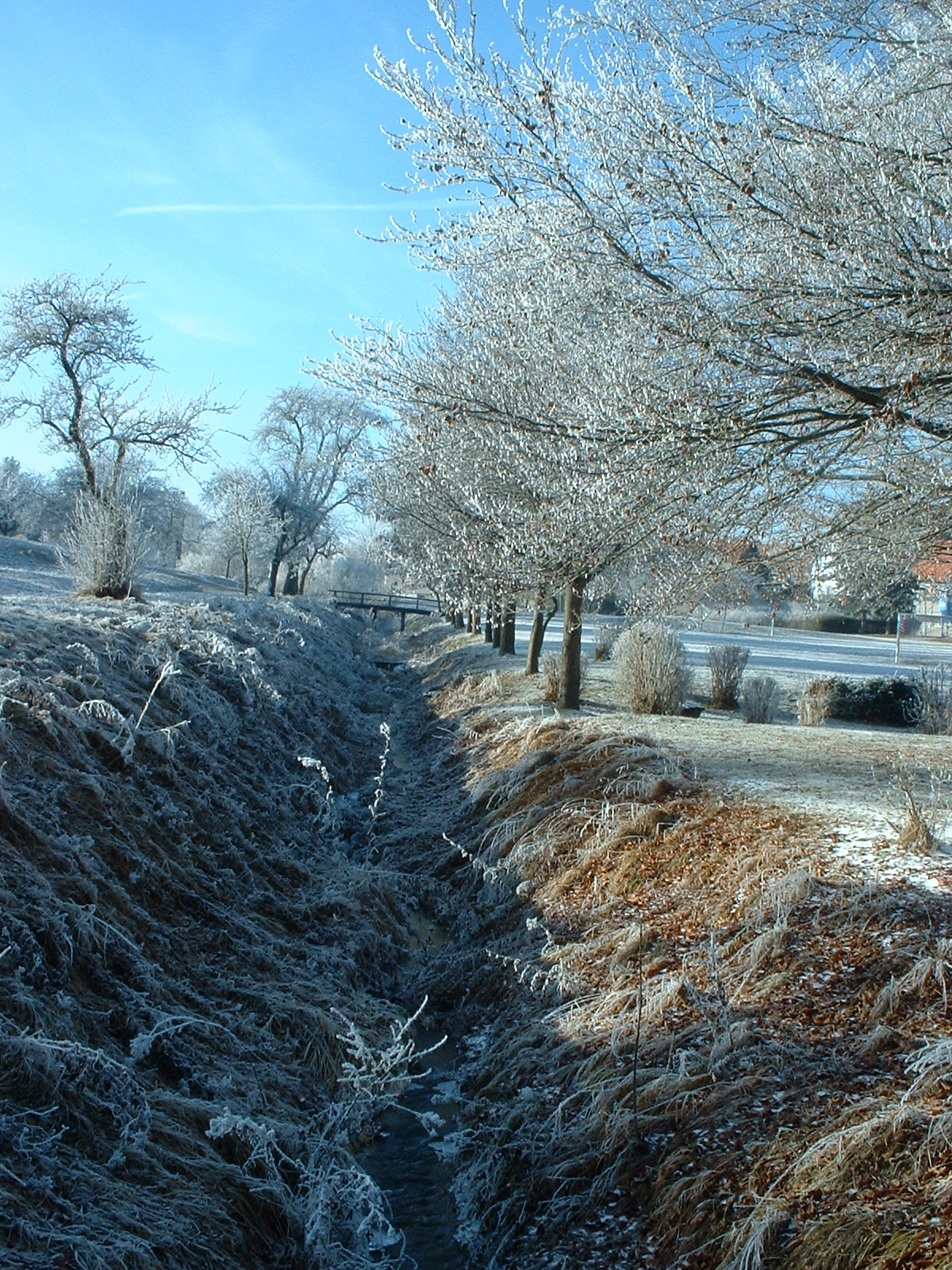
- The Mettenbach below the palace garden at the Sassenage Garden, view upstream

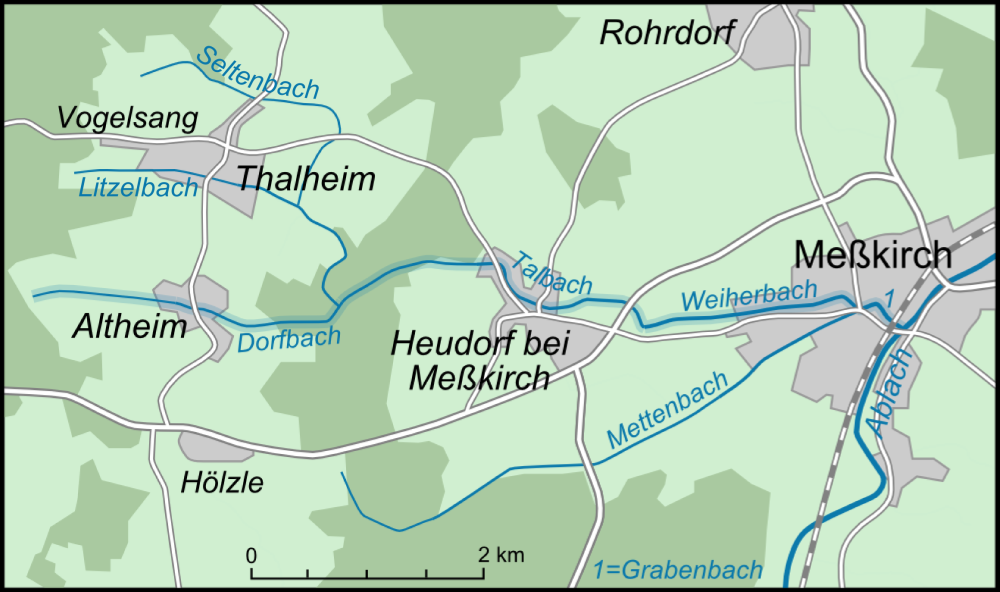

Location
- Country: Germany
- States: Baden-Württemberg

Physical characteristics
- Source
  - location: Simonsbrunnen, near Sauldorf
  - elevation: 670 m (2,200 ft)
- Mouth
  - location: Grabenbach in Meßkirch
  - coordinates: 47.9945°N 9.1108°E
  - elevation: 610 m (2,000 ft)
- Length: 5.314 km (3.302 mi)
- Basin size: 5.8 km^{2} (2.2 sq mi)

Basin features
- Progression: Grabenbach→ Ablach→ Danube→ Black Sea
- River system: Danube
- Tributaries
  - left: Altstadtgraben, Kapellenweggraben

Mettenbach is a small river in the district of Sigmaringen in southern Baden-Württemberg, Germany. It is a right tributary of the Grabenbach in the town of Meßkirch. In its upper course, above the confluence with the Kapellenweggraben, it is known as the Schwarzer Graben.

== Name ==
Up to the point where the Kapellenweggraben joins it, roughly a kilometre before the built-up edge of Meßkirch, the stream is also known as the Schwarzer Graben ("black ditch"), probably because it flows through boggy meadows.

In the lower part of the Schwarzer Graben stretch, just to the right of the course, lies the wooded parcel known as Ettenbach. Immediately before the edge of Meßkirch's built-up area, a hillside meadow parcel called Im Mettenbach lies to the left of the stream.

== Geography ==
=== Course ===
The Schwarzer Graben rises at the so-called Simonsbrunnen, between the Kohlbetterhof (part of the municipality of Sauldorf) and the Roman old town site, in wooded terrain that opens into fields toward Meßkirch, already within Meßkirch's boundary. The Simonsbrunnen spring is no longer visible today, having been captured by underground drainage pipes; the stream emerges roughly 200 metres below the spring site.

The stream initially flows just under a kilometre to the southeast, entering woodland where it mostly runs in a broad strip of open ground. It then turns onto a fairly steady east-northeast course alongside a high-voltage line and leaves the forest at the Ried. In this flat terrain, two short drainage ditches begin to the left of the stream, feeding into the so-called Altstadtgraben, a 2.5 km-long left-bank headwater that passes the isolated Meßkirch farmstead of Altstadt and exceeds the Schwarzer Graben up to this point in both length and catchment area; its valley is known as the Lippentäle. One of the ditches begins at the former Ochsenbrunnen spring, no longer visible today.

Further downstream, the Schwarzer Graben passes under Bundesstraße 313 between a wooded island on the left slope and the forest to the right, which only recedes further on beyond this point. The valley then cuts more deeply into the parcel known as Birkenloch, where the smaller left-bank tributary Kapellenweggraben joins at a small pond.

From here the stream is called the Mettenbach. After just under a kilometre, still flowing roughly east-northeast, it reaches the first houses of Meßkirch on its left bank. Half a kilometre later it enters the palace garden (Hofgarten) of Schloss Meßkirch, after which it runs a further stretch through Meßkirch's old town, passing behind what is today the Herz-Jesu-Heim. Culverted beneath the Adlerplatz, it joins from the right the Weiherbach, which flows in from Heudorf; from that confluence the combined stream is called the Grabenbach, which flows into the Ablach around 500 metres further on.

=== Catchment area ===
The Mettenbach drains a catchment area of around 5.8 km^{2} (2.2 sq mi), which forms part of the Meßkircher Albsaum (Heubergsaum) subregion of the Donau-Ablach-Platten natural region. Its highest point lies on a rise carrying a water reservoir above the source area of the Altstadtgraben, northeast of the Sauldorf hamlet of Hölzle, reaching an elevation of 708.2 m above sea level. The northern watershed running from there to the mouth borders the upper catchment of the Weiherbach/Grabenbach, which carries different names along its upper course. Along the shorter southeastern catchment boundary to the right of the lower course, the Grabenbach's receiving stream, the Ablach, takes up water flowing the other way. In the south and west of the catchment, the higher tributary Krumbach or Krummbach and its own tributaries drain the adjoining area.

=== Tributaries ===
- Altstadtgraben, from the left and northwest, 2.5 km
- Kapellenweggraben, from the left and northwest, 1.3 km

== Restoration and the Sassenage Garden ==
In 2004, the Friends of the Earth Germany (BUND) restored a 1.4-kilometre stretch of the upper course to a more natural state.

In 2004, the Meßkirch branch of the Swabian Alb Club planted a new traditional orchard meadow (Streuobstwiese) in the middle part of the valley.

In 1981, the so-called Sassenage Garden was laid out on the left bank of the Mettenbach in the palace garden, in honour of Meßkirch's French twin town of Sassenage; its pond is fed by the Mettenbach. The garden was completely redone in April 2008.

In earlier times, immediately before this confluence, the Mettenbach flowed through the garden of the Capuchin monastery (founded in 1661 by Franz Christoph of the Fürstenberg-Meßkirch line, demolished in 1828) and beneath the Loreto Chapel (built 1676/1677). The chapel was dismantled in 1883 and rebuilt as the chapel of the Marienhaus on what is now Kolpingstraße.

== Historical attestations of the stream's name ==
Zimmern Chronicle, mid-16th century

- Mettenbach: vol. 2, p. 81
- Mettenbach: vol. 4, p. 298
- Mettenbach: vol. 4, p. 301

Boundary markers of Meßkirch, 18th century

- Ettenbächle

Topographic map 1:50,000 of the Grand Duchy of Baden, 1849

- Ettibach

Topographic map 1:50,000 of the Kingdom of Württemberg, 1850

- Ettibach (very likely taken from the Baden map above, as the two are identical in this area)

Atlas of the Meßkirch cadastral area, 1872–1874

- Mettenbach: at what is today the Herz-Jesu-Heim

Survey map of the Meßkirch cadastral area, 1873

- Mettenbach: in the Breiteäcker parcel
- Im Mettenbach: parcel name

Topographic map 1:25,000, Baden State Survey Office, c. 1925

- Mettenbach: roughly in the area of the Im Mettenbach parcel
- Schwarzer Graben: roughly in the area of the In den Burgwiesen parcel

Topographic map 1:50,000 (TOP50), Baden-Württemberg State Survey Office, 2001

- Mettenbach

Topographic map 1:25,000 (TOP25), Baden-Württemberg State Survey Office, 2003

- Mettenbach: roughly in the area of the Im Mettenbach parcel
- Schwarzer Graben: roughly in the area of the In den Burgwiesen parcel

Further attestations (from Werner Fischer, 1998, pp. 55ff.)

- Mettebach: 1560
- Ettenbach: 1561
- Mettinbach, Mettinbächlein: 1683
- Großer Mettinbach: 1683
- Mettenbach, Mettenbächlin: 1690
- Mettinbach, Mettenbach: 1694
- Mettinbach: 1727, 1810, 1816
- Möttinbach: 1747
- Äußerer Mettinbach: 1747
- Klein Mettinbach: 1747
- Mettebach: 1790
- Mettenbach: 1840

== See also ==
- List of rivers of Baden-Württemberg
