= Mettenbach =

Mettenbach may refer to:

- Mettenbach (Erlenbach), a river of Baden-Württemberg, Germany, tributary of the Erlenbach
- Mettenbach (Grabenbach), a river of Baden-Württemberg, Germany, tributary of the Grabenbach
