= Weiherbach (Talbach) =

River in Germany

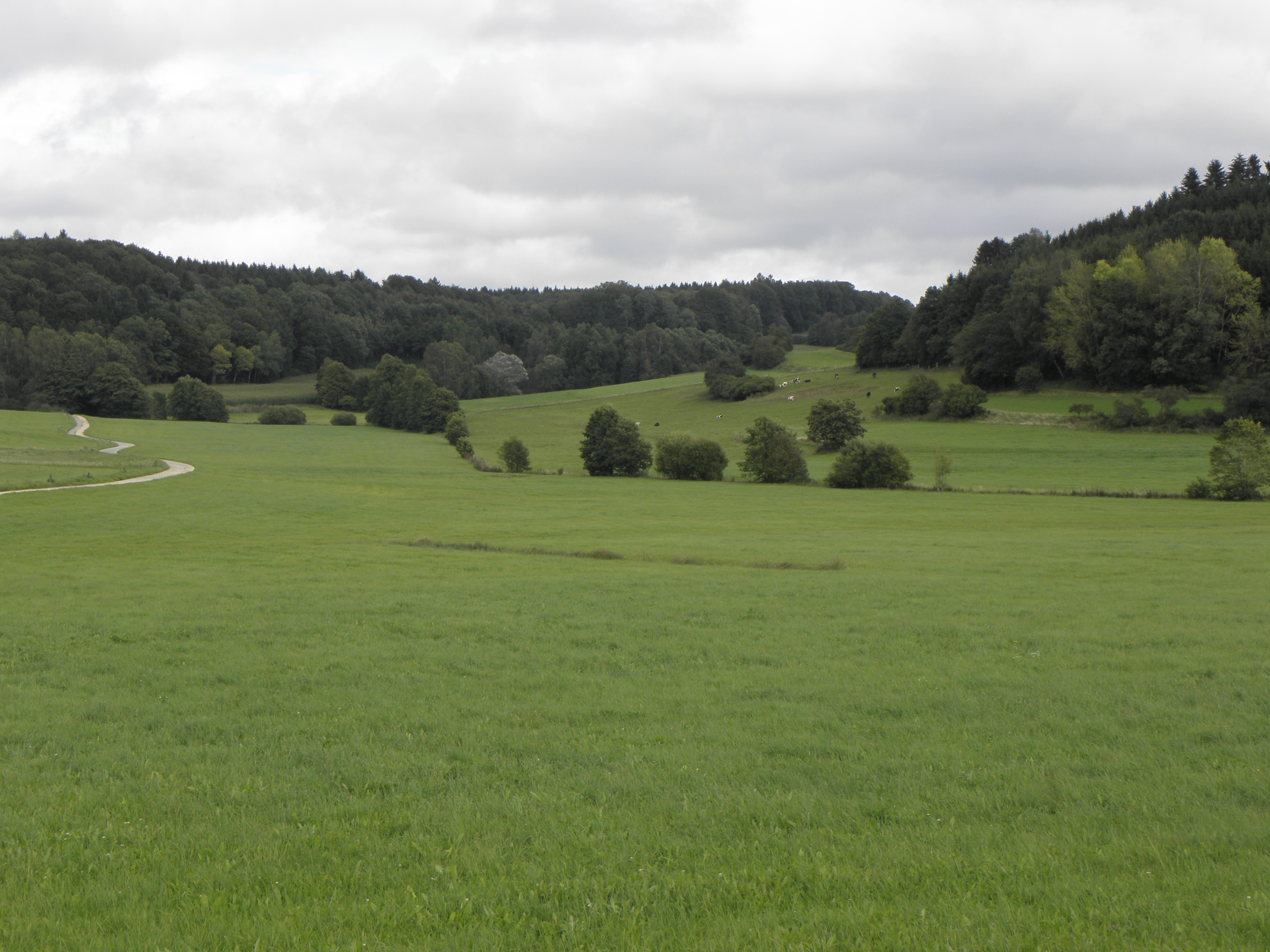

Location
- Country: Germany
- State: Baden-Württemberg

Physical characteristics
- Mouth
  - location: Talbach
  - coordinates: 48.0128°N 9.1623°E

Basin features
- Progression: Talbach→ Ablach→ Danube→ Black Sea

Weiherbach is a river of Baden-Württemberg, Germany. It is a left tributary of the Talbach near Menningen.

== See also ==
- List of rivers of Baden-Württemberg
