= Ablach =

Ablach may refer to:

- Ablach (Danube), a right tributary of the Danube in Baden-Württemberg, Germany
- Ablach (Krauchenwies), a village, part of Krauchenwies, a municipality in the district of Sigmaringen in Baden-Württemberg, Germany
- Emain Ablach, a mythical island paradise in Irish mythology
