= Annenbach =

River in Germany

- The Annenbach on the edge of the forest south of Rohrdorf

- Location of mouth in Baden-Württemberg

Location
- Country: Germany
- State: Baden-Württemberg

Physical characteristics
- Mouth
  - location: Talbach
  - coordinates: 48.0163°N 9.1461°E

Basin features
- Progression: Talbach→ Ablach→ Danube→ Black Sea

Annenbach is a small river of Baden-Württemberg, Germany. It flows into the Talbach northeast of Meßkirch.

== See also ==
- List of rivers of Baden-Württemberg
