= Arnold Stadler =

German writer, essayist and translator (born 1954)

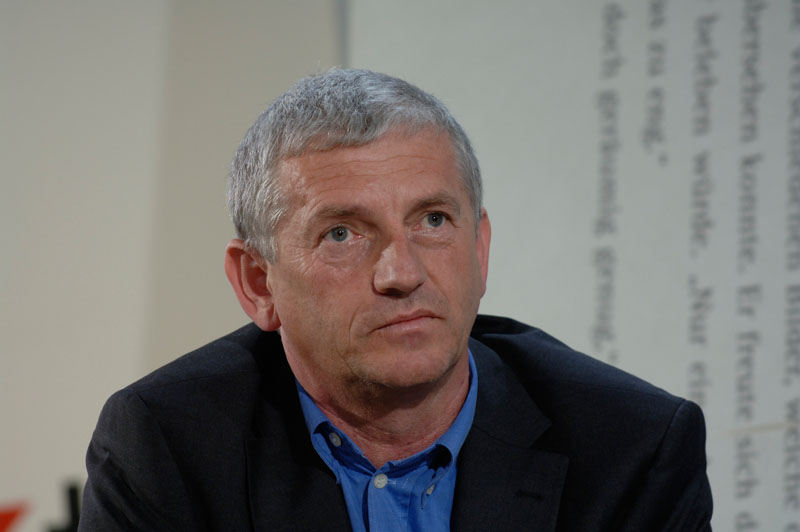
- Born: 9 April 1954 (age 72); Meßkirch, West Germany
- Occupation: Novelist
- Writing career
- Period: 1986–present
- Notable work: Ein hinreissender Schrotthändler

Arnold Stadler (born 1954) is a German writer, essayist and translator.

== Life ==
He was born on 9 April 1954 in Meßkirch in the district of Sigmaringen in Baden-Württemberg in Germany. Stadler grew up on a farm in Rast, a small village adjoining Sauldorf, a neighboring village of his birthplace Meßkirch. Stadler studied catholic theology in Munich and Rome, German philology at Freiburg im Breisgau and Köln, ending with a doctoral degree (Dr. phil.). The first serious and prominent recommendation regarding his works came 1994 of Martin Walser (Der Spiegel No. 31 from 1 August 1994). The partial autobiographically affected works play frequently in his region of origin (Heimat), the landscape between the Danube and the Lake of Constance. The change of this rurally shaped area and its homelessness (Heimatlosigkeit) are recurring topics in his literary works.

== Literature awards and distinctions ==
- 1989 Literature Award (Literaturförderpreis) of the Jürgen Ponto Stiftung
- 1994 Hermann Hesse Award (Förderpreis) for Feuerland
- 1995 Nicolas Born Prize of the Hubert Burda Stiftung
- 1996 Thaddäus-Troll-Preis
- 1996 Culture Prize "Der Feldweg" of the Museum Society Wald, Baden-Württemberg
- 1997 Mark Brandenburg Scholarship for literature (Märkisches Stipendium für Literatur)
- 1998 Marie Luise Kaschnitz Prize
- 1998/1999 Stadtschreiber von Bergen
- 1999 Alemannischer Literaturpreis
- 1999 Georg Büchner Prize
- 2002 Medal for Merit of the state of Baden-Württemberg
- 2002 Participating Max Kade writer at the Washington University in St. Louis
- 2004 Stefan Andres Prize
- 2004/2005 Scholarship holder of the International Künstlerhaus Villa Concordia in Bamberg
- 2006 Honoris causa of the Freien Universität Berlin (Faculty for historical and cultural sciences; Seminar for catholic theology; Laudatorin: Annette Schavan).
- 2009 Kleist Prize (destined by Péter Esterházy)
- 2010 Johann Peter Hebel Prize
- 2014 Bodensee-Literaturpreis

Stadler is member of the foundation board for the Peace Prize of the German Book Trade.

== Works ==
- Kein Herz und keine Seele. Man muss es singen können, Gedichte, Erker-Verlag, St. Gallen 1986
- Das Buch der Psalmen und die deutschsprachige Lyrik des 20. Jahrhunderts. Zu den Psalmen im Werk Bertolt Brechts und Paul Celans (= Dissertation zur Erlangung des Doktorgrades der Phil. Fak. der Univ. Köln, vorgelegt von A. Stadler 1986), Böhlau Verlag, Köln, Wien 1989
- Ich war einmal, Roman, Residenz, Salzburg 1989
- Feuerland, Roman, Residenz, Salzburg 1992
- Mein Hund, meine Sau, mein Leben, Roman, Residenz, Salzburg 1994
- Warum toben die Heiden und andere Psalmen, Residenz, Salzburg 1995
- Gedichte aufs Land, mit Offsetlithografien von Hildegard Pütz, Eremiten-Presse, Düsseldorf 1995
- Der Tod und ich, wir zwei, Residenz, Salzburg 1996
- Johann Peter Hebels Unvergänglichkeit, Mayer, Berlin/Stuttgart 1997
- Ausflug nach Afrika. Eine Wintergeschichte, Edition Isele, Eggingen 1997
- Volubilis oder Meine Reisen ans Ende der Welt, Erzählungen, Edition Isele, Eggingen 1999
- Ein hinreissender Schrotthändler, Roman, DuMont, Köln 1999, Taschenbuch Goldmann, München 2001
- Die Menschen lügen. Alle. Und andere Psalmen, Insel, Frankfurt a.M. 1999
- Erbarmen mit dem Seziermesser, Essays, DuMont, Köln 2000
- Tohuwabohu. Heiliges und Profanes, gelesen und wiedergelesen von Arnold Stadler nach dem 11. September 2001, Anthologie, DuMont, Köln, August 2002
- Sehnsucht. Versuch über das erste Mal, Roman, DuMont, Köln, August 2002
- Eines Tages, vielleicht auch nachts, Roman, Jung und Jung, 2003
- Mein Stifter. Porträt eines Selbstmörders in spe, DuMont, Köln 2005
- Komm, gehen wir. Roman, S. Fischer, Frankfurt a. M. 2007
- Salvatore, S. Fischer, Frankfurt a. M. 2008
- Träumen vom Fliegen, mit dem Fotokünstler Jan von Holleben, Hoffmann und Campe, Hamburg 2008
- Einmal auf der Welt. Und dann so. Roman (kompilierte, überarbeitete und erweiterte Fassung der Romane Ich war einmal, Feuerland und Mein Hund, meine Sau, mein Leben), S. Fischer, Frankfurt a. M. 2009
- New York machen wir das nächste Mal. Geschichten aus dem Zweistromland, S. Fischer, Frankfurt a. M. 2011
- Auf dem Weg nach Winterreute: Ein Ausflug in die Welt des Malers Jakob Bräckle, Jung und Jung, Salzburg, Wien 2012
- Da steht ein großes JA vor mir. Zu einer Arbeit von Margaret Marquardt. Jung und Jung, Salzburg 2013, ISBN 978-3-99027-039-4.
- Bilder als Partituren des Lebens: Ein Ausflug in die Welt des Malers Jakob Braeckle. Eine Vergegenwärtigung. Steiner, Stuttgart 2013, ISBN 978-3-515-10444-9.
- Rauschzeit. S. Fischer, Frankfurt am Main 2016, ISBN 978-3-10-075139-3.

== Literature ==
- Irene Armbruster: Büchner-Preisträger Arnold Stadler in New York. Kein Landei; in: "Aufbau" No. 8, New York, April 20, 2000; p. 7.
- Martin Walser: Über das Verbergen der Verzweiflung; in: "DER SPIEGEL" Nr. 29/1999, Hamburg, 19. Juli 1999; S. 161–162.
- Stuart Taberner: Contemporary German Fiction: Writing in the Berlin Republic. Cambridge University Press, 2007, ISBN 0-521-86078-4
- Gregory Alexander Knott: Arnold Stadler and the metaphysics of Heimat. Thesis (Ph. D.), Washington University, 2007.
