= Grabenbach =

Grabenbach may refer to:

- Grabenbach (Ablach), a river of Baden-Württemberg, Germany, tributary of the Ablach
- Grabenbach (Bad Reichenhall), a river of Bavaria, Germany, tributary of the Saalach, in Bad Reichenhall
- Grabenbach Formation, a geologic formation in Austria
