= Weiherbach =

Weiherbach may refer to:

- Weiherbach (Talbach), a river of Baden-Württemberg, Germany, tributary of the Talbach at Memmingen
- Weiherbach (Schmiech), a river of Baden-Württemberg, Germany, tributary of the Schmiech
