= Riggenbach =

Riggenbach is a Germanic surname of Swiss origin.

- Albert Riggenbach (19th century), meteorologist
- Niklaus Riggenbach (1817-1899), Swiss inventor
  - Riggenbach counter-pressure brake
  - Riggenbach rack system
- Holly Black née Riggenbach (born 1971), American writer and editor

== See also ==
- Riggenbach's gerbil, an African gerbil species
- Hyperolius riggenbachi, an African frog species
- Ringgenbach, a river in Baden-Württemberg, Germany
