= Lautenbach (Ablach) =

River in Germany

Location
- Country: Germany
- States: Baden-Württemberg

Physical characteristics
- Mouth
  - location: Ablach
  - coordinates: 48.0018°N 9.1873°E

Basin features
- Progression: Ablach→ Danube→ Black Sea

Lautenbach (German pronunciation: [ˈlaʊtn̩bax]) is a small river of Baden-Württemberg, Germany. It flows into the Ablach near Krauchenwies.

== See also ==
- List of rivers of Baden-Württemberg
