= Talbach (Ablach, Göggingen) =

River in Germany

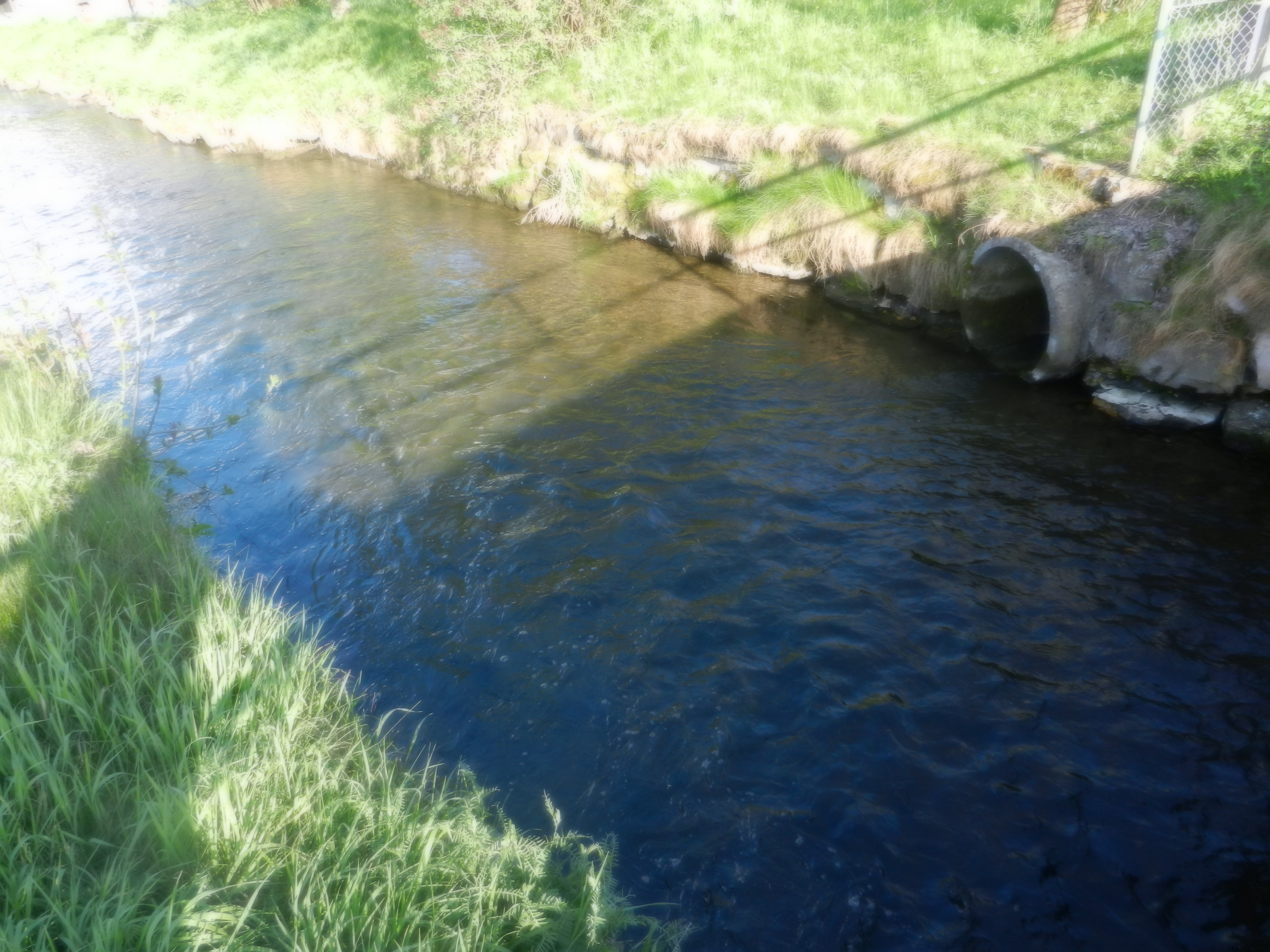

Location
- Country: Germany
- State: Baden-Württemberg

Physical characteristics
- Mouth
  - location: Ablach
  - coordinates: 48.0070°N 9.1964°E

Basin features
- Progression: Ablach→ Danube→ Black Sea

Talbach is a small river of Baden-Württemberg, Germany. In Göggingen, district of Krauchenwies, it flows from the right via the Triebwerkskanal Ott into the Ablach.

== See also ==
- List of rivers of Baden-Württemberg
