= Kehlbach =

Kehlbach may refer to:

- Kehlbach (Rhineland-Palatinate), a municipality in the district of Rhein-Lahn, Rhineland-Palatinate, Germany
- Kehlbach (Andelsbach), a river of Baden-Württemberg, Germany, tributary of the Andelsbach
- Kehlbach (Salzach), a river in Salzburg, Austria, tributary of the Salzach
