= Kehlbach (Andelsbach) =

River in Germany

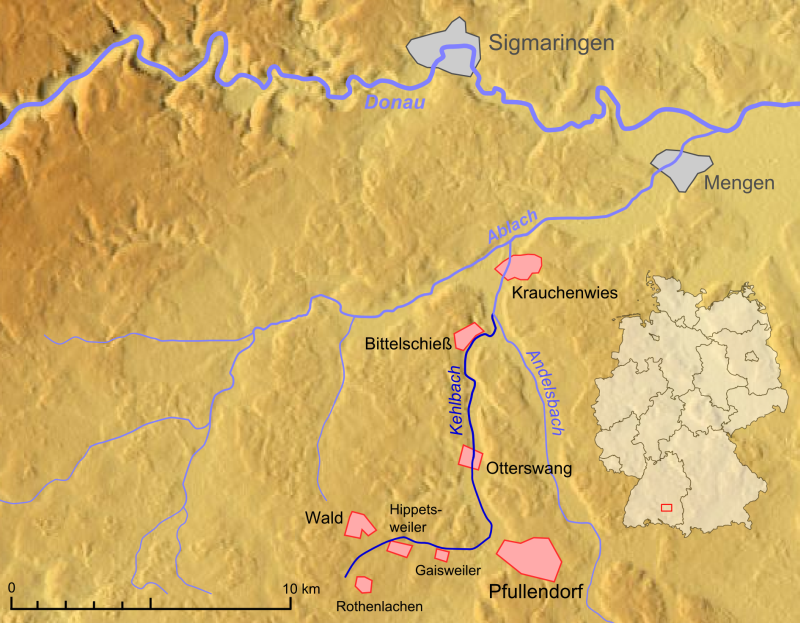
- Map of the Kehlbach

Location
- Country: Germany
- State: Baden-Württemberg

Physical characteristics
- Mouth
  - location: Andelsbach
  - coordinates: 48.0003°N 9.2386°E
- Length: 16.0 km (9.9 mi)

Basin features
- Progression: Andelsbach→ Ablach→ Danube→ Black Sea

Kehlbach (German pronunciation: [ˈkeːlbax]) is a river of Baden-Württemberg, Germany. It flows into the Andelsbach south of Krauchenwies.

== See also ==
- List of rivers of Baden-Württemberg
