= Aspenbach =

River in Germany

- Location within Baden-Württemberg

Location
- Country: Germany
- State: Baden-Württemberg

Physical characteristics
- Mouth
  - location: Ablach
  - coordinates: 47.9758°N 9.1031°E

Basin features
- Progression: Ablach→ Danube→ Black Sea

The Aspenbach is a river in Baden-Württemberg, Germany. It flows into the Ablach near Meßkirch.

== See also ==
- List of rivers of Baden-Württemberg
