= Mettenbach (Erlenbach) =

River in Germany

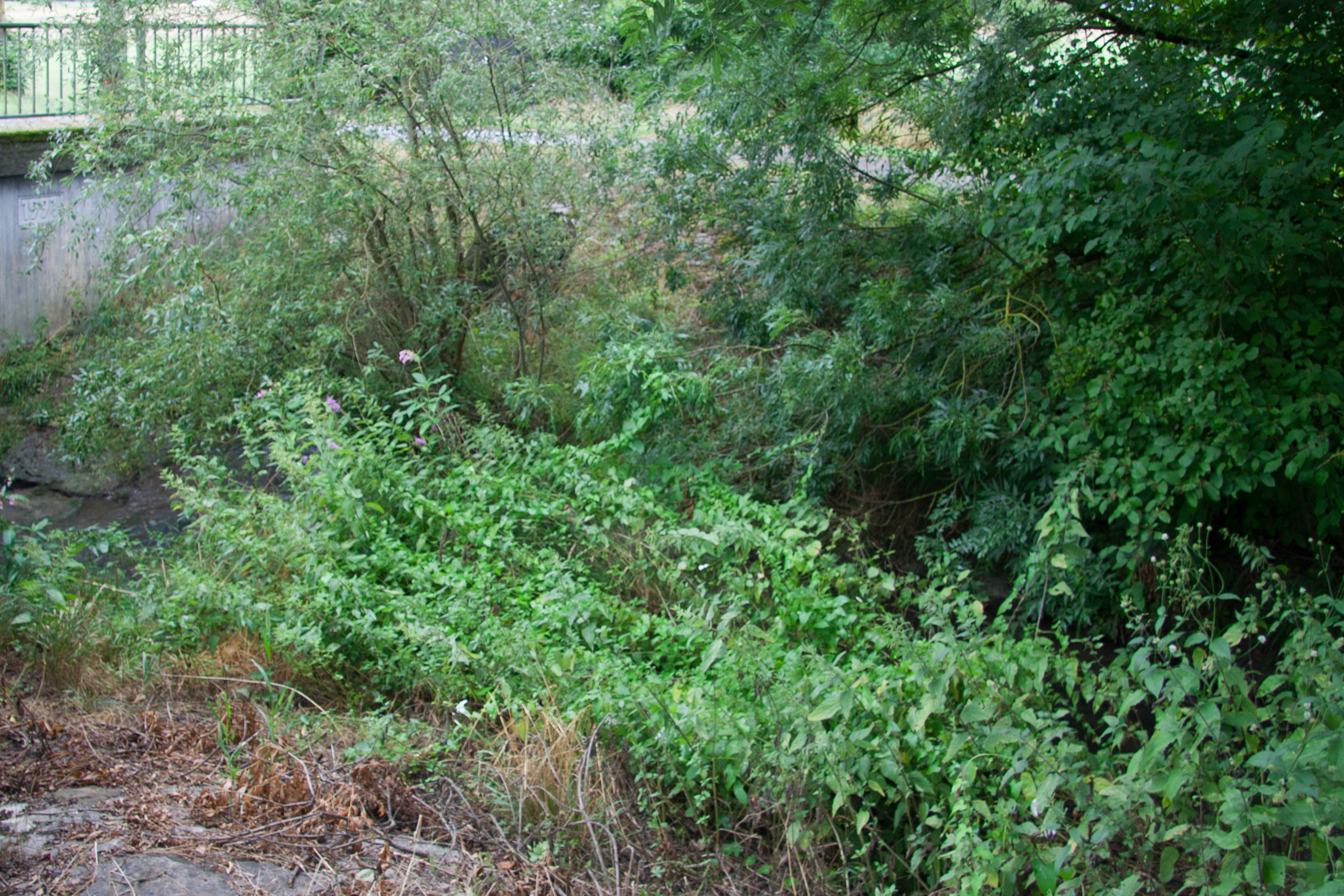
- Region of the Mettenbach's mouth

Location
- Country: Germany
- State: Baden-Württemberg

Physical characteristics
- Mouth
  - location: Erlenbach
  - coordinates: 48.9624°N 8.8005°E

Basin features
- Progression: Erlenbach→ Enz→ Neckar→ Rhine→ North Sea

Mettenbach is a small river of Baden-Württemberg, Germany. It is a left tributary of the Erlenbach at Ötisheim.

== See also ==
- List of rivers of Baden-Württemberg
