= Krummbach (Ablach) =

River in Germany

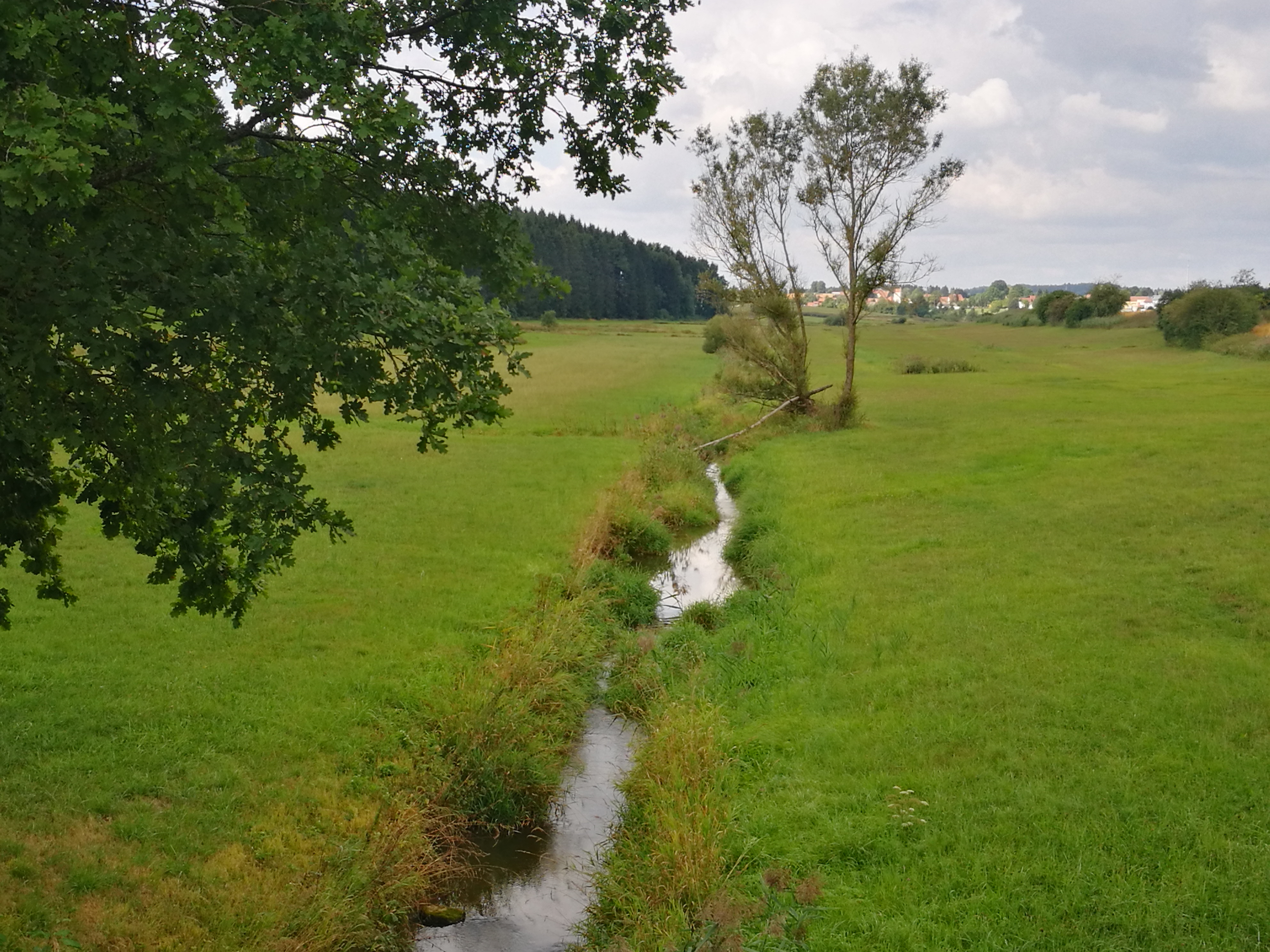

Location
- Country: Germany
- State: Baden-Württemberg

Physical characteristics
- Mouth
  - location: Ablach
  - coordinates: 47.9685°N 9.1012°E
- Length: 14.8 km (9.2 mi)

Basin features
- Progression: Ablach→ Danube→ Black Sea

Krummbach is a river of Baden-Württemberg, Germany. It flows into the Ablach near Meßkirch.

== See also ==
- List of rivers of Baden-Württemberg
