= Ringgenbach =

River in Germany

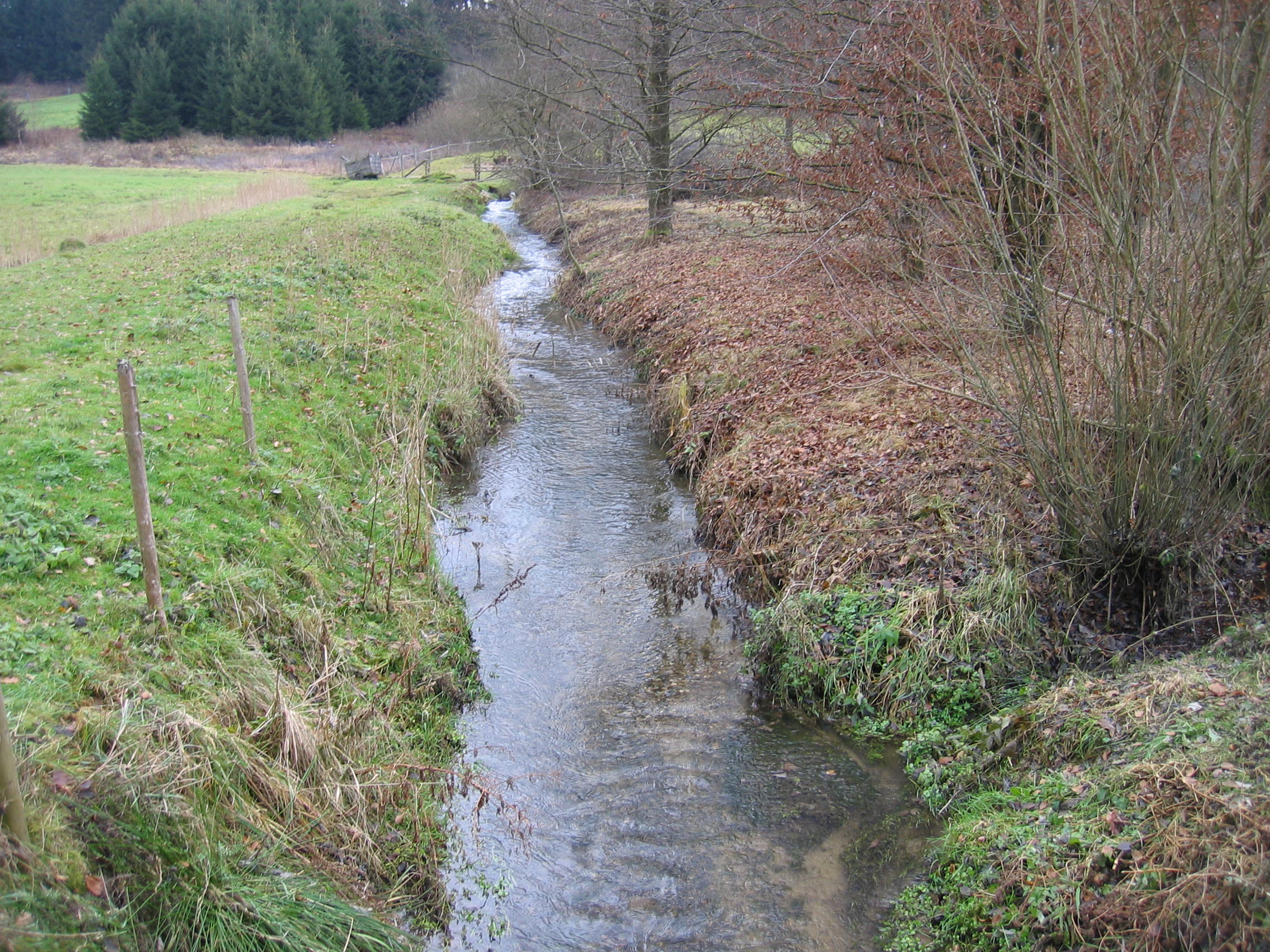

Location
- Country: Germany
- States: Baden-Württemberg

Physical characteristics
- Mouth
  - location: Ablach
  - coordinates: 48.0017°N 9.1728°E

Basin features
- Progression: Ablach→ Danube→ Black Sea

Ringgenbach is a river of Baden-Württemberg, Germany. It rises near the Walbertsweiler hamlet within the municipality of Wald, flowing north through the municipality of Meßkirch hamlets of Dietershofen and then Ringgenbach, before reaching a confluence into the Ablach, east of the main district of Meßkirch.

== See also ==
- List of rivers of Baden-Württemberg
