= Ötisheim =

German municipality

- Municipality
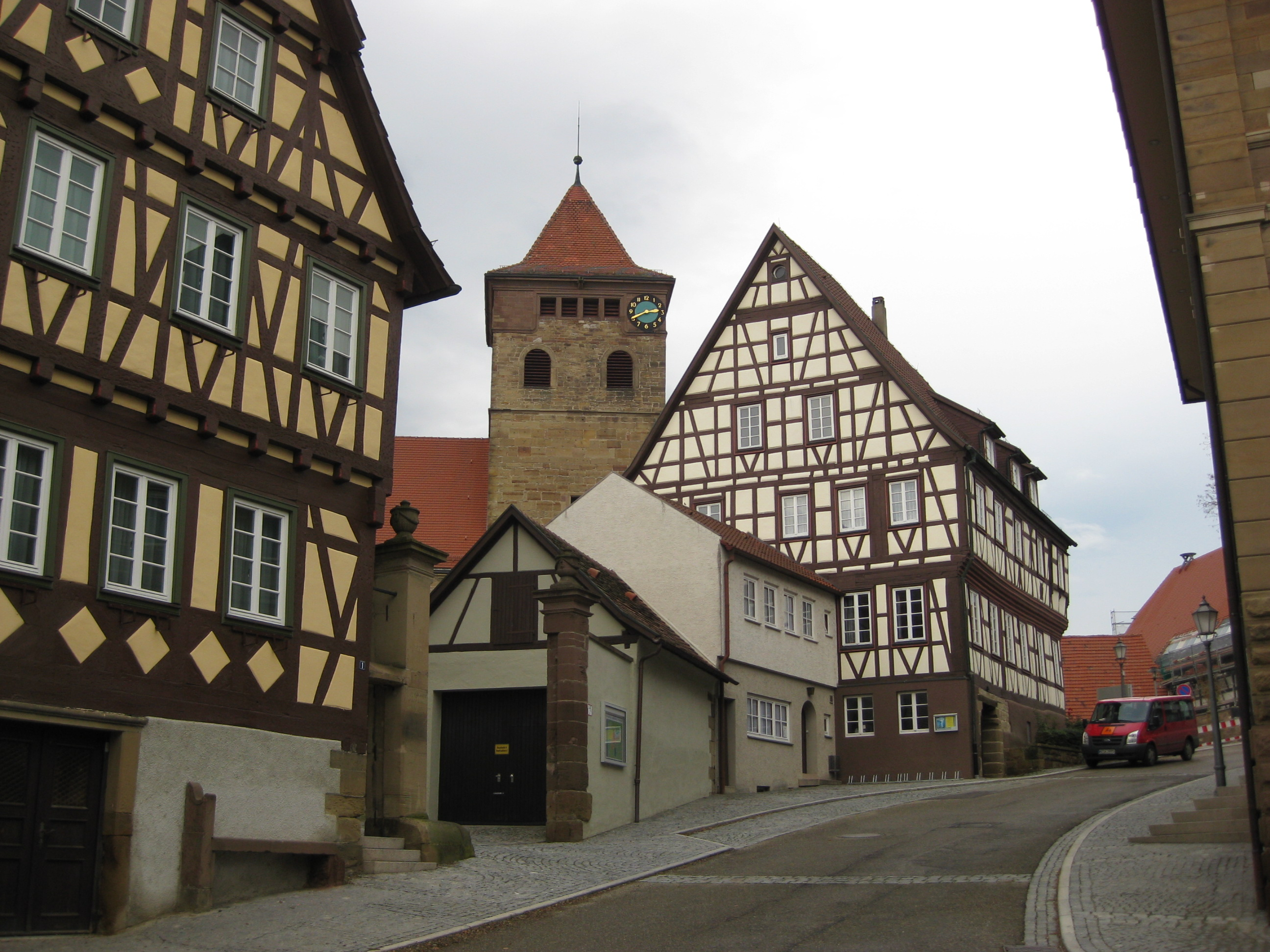
- Ötisheim

- Coat of arms

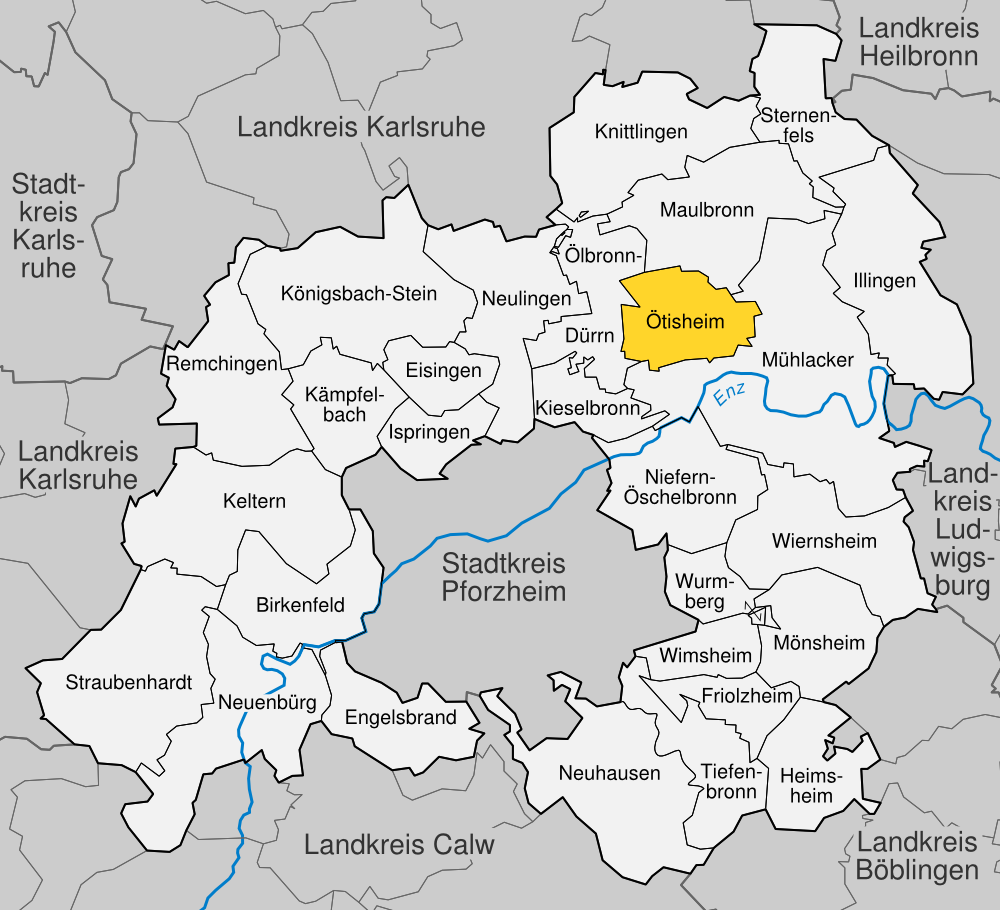
- Location of Ötisheim within Enzkreis district
- Interactive map of Ötisheim
- Location within Germany Location within Baden-Württemberg
- Coordinates: 48°57′43″N 8°48′35″E
- Country: Germany
- State: Baden-Württemberg
- Admin. region: Karlsruhe
- District: Enzkreis

Area
  - Total: 14.27 km^{2} (5.51 sq mi)
- Elevation: 243 m (797 ft)

Population (2025-12-31)
  - Total: 4,681
  - Density: 328.0/km^{2} (849.6/sq mi)
- Time zone: UTC+01:00 (CET)
  - Summer (DST): UTC+02:00 (CEST)
- Postal codes: 75443
- Dialling codes: 07041
- Vehicle registration: PF
- Website: www.oetisheim.de

Ötisheim (German pronunciation: [ˈøːtɪsˌhaɪ̯m]), known in local dialect as Aize, is a municipality in the Enz district of Baden-Württemberg, Germany.

== History ==
Ötisheim became a property of Maulbronn Monastery around 1177 and remained as such until it was finally and permanently dissolved in 1806. The district of Maulbronn was reorganized as an Oberamt on 18 March 1806. Ötisheim remained under Maulbronn's jurisdiction until 1 October 1938, when it was reassigned to Landkreis Vaihingen. After World War II, it was able to grow substantially thanks its connection by rail. On 1 January 1973, as part of the 1973 Baden-Württemberg district reform, Ötisheim was assigned to the newly created Enz district.

== Geography ==
The municipality (Gemeinde) of Ötisheim covers 14.26 square kilometers (5.51 sq mi) of the Enz district of Baden-Württemberg, within the Federal Republic of Germany. Ötisheim is physically located where the flat and dry Bauschlotter Plateau, made up of keuper and layers of the Upper Muschelkalk, meets the Stromberg and its loess-coated muschelkalk and keuper hills. The primary watercourse is the Erlenbach, which flows south to southeast through the municipal area. The lowest elevation above sea level in the municipality, 226 meters (741 ft) Normalnull (NN), is found where the Erlenbach forms the border with Mühlacker. The highest elevation, 322 meters (1,056 ft) NN, is found at the top of the Sauberg.

The Alder, Metten and Gründelbach lowlands and Bauschlotter Au Federally-protected nature reserves are located in the municipal area.

== Coat of arms ==
Ötisheim's coat of arms displays a red crosier crossed by a green lizard upon a field of gold. The crosier is a reference to Maulbronn Monastery and the lizard, pronounced "Aitsa", is a reference to Ötisheim's name in the local dialect, Aize. This pattern and tincture date to 1514, and was approved on 28 September 1950. A variant of this pattern that was used until the 1930s, from a seal dated to 1529, shows just the lizard, placed onto a shield with a two-headed eagle.
