= Talbach (Ablach, Menningen) =

River in Baden-Württemberg, Germany

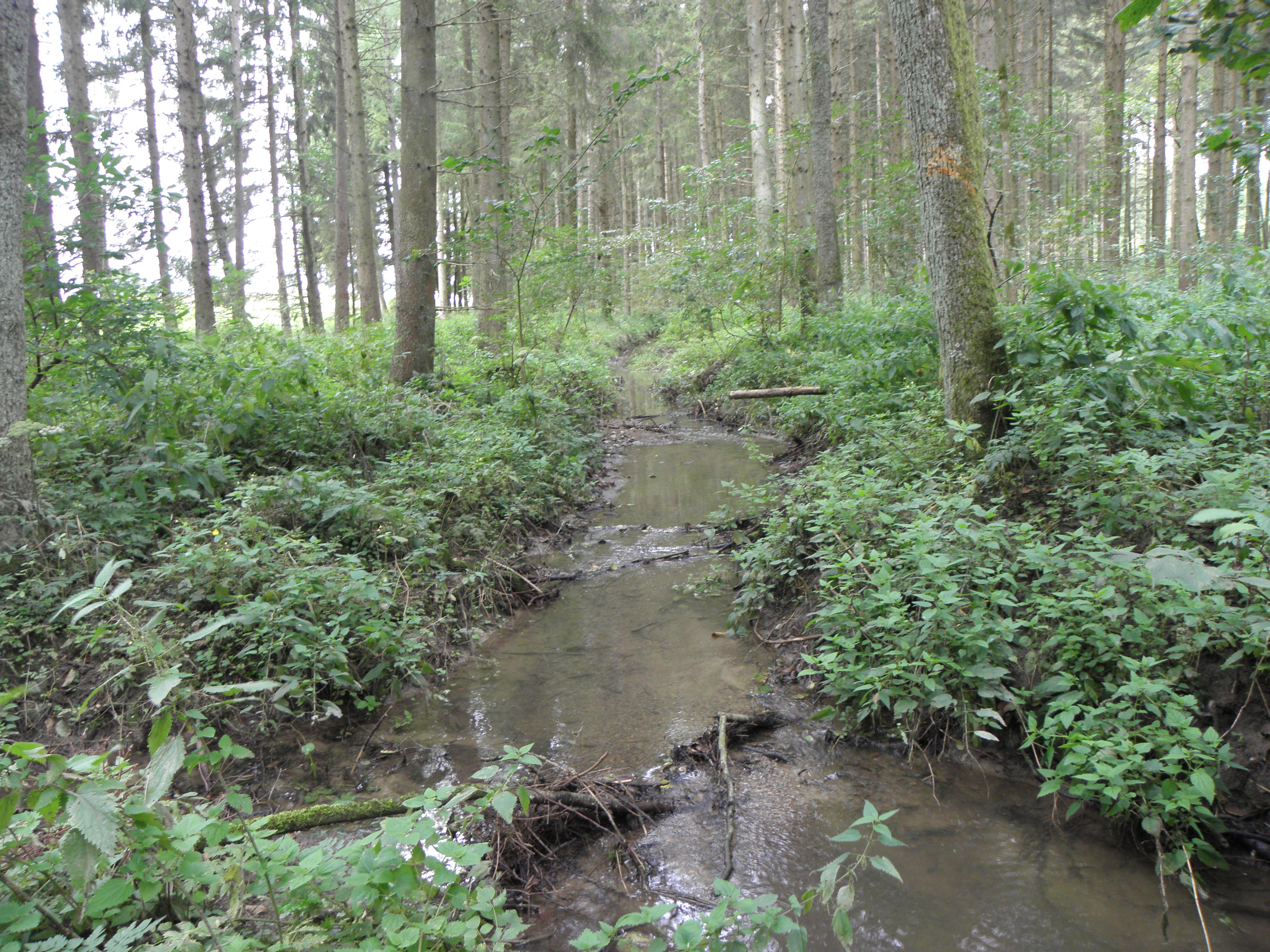
- The Talbach, 80 meters above the stream sink

Location
- Country: Germany
- State: Baden-Württemberg

Physical characteristics
- Mouth
  - location: Ablach
  - coordinates: 48.0082°N 9.1579°E
- Length: 6.5 km (4.0 mi)

Basin features
- Progression: Ablach→ Danube→ Black Sea

Talbach is a 6.5-kilometre-long (4.0 mi) stream in the Sigmaringen district in southern Baden-Württemberg, Germany. It is a left tributary of the Ablach in Menningen.

== Geography ==
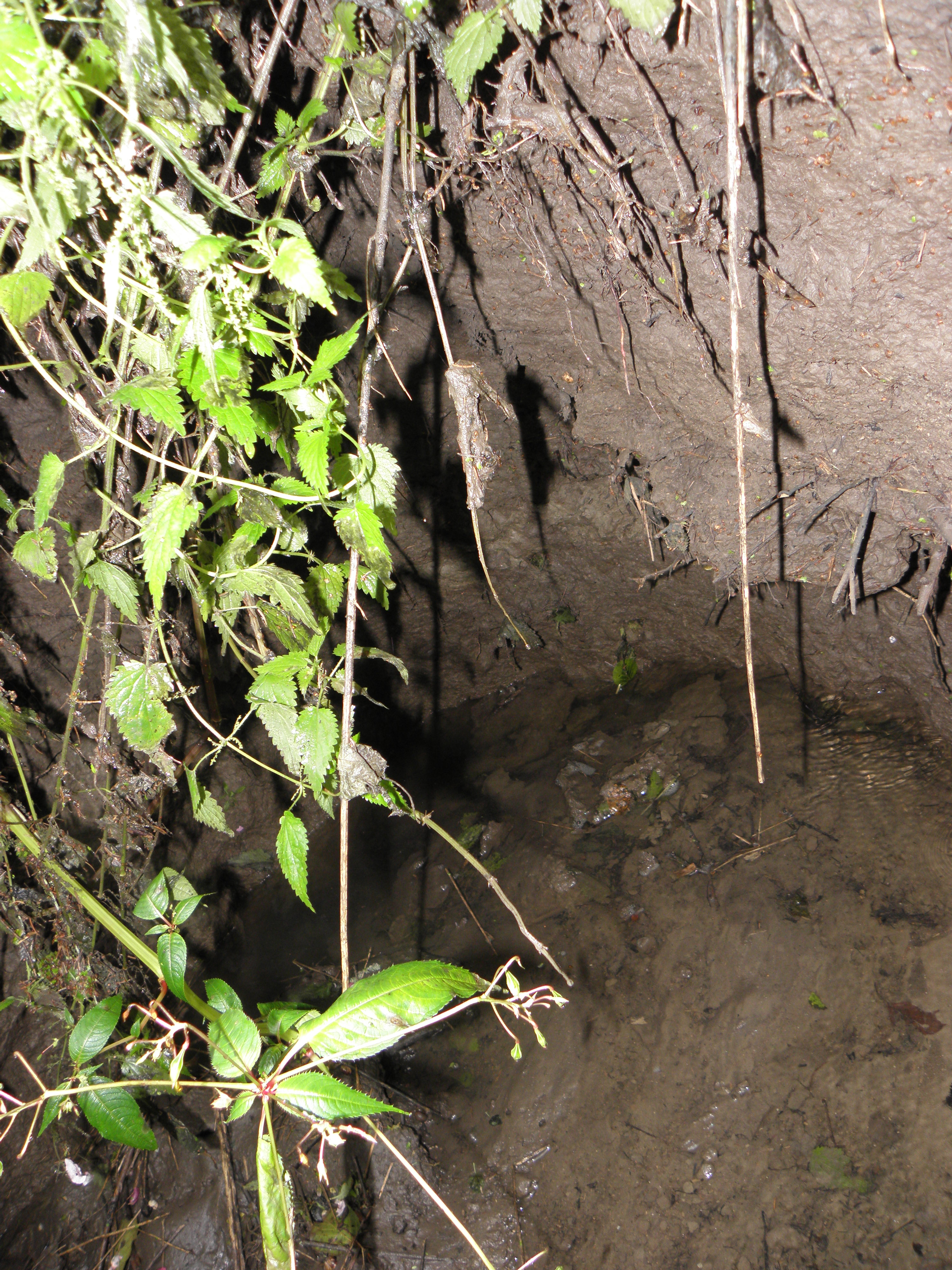
A ponor in the upper reaches

=== Course ===
The Talbach originates a quarter of a kilometre south of the village border of Engelswies, in the Inzigkofen municipality on the eastern slope of Talsberg at just 665 m above sea level in the middle of fields. First of all, flowing eastward, the stream creates a nearly one and a half kilometer long northern arc, and then it flows south. After continuing for almost the same distance again, mostly on the edge of the forests Kohlhau and Hartwald, it reaches the mouth of Kaibach, the first major inlet, which joins the stream from the right as the Talbach enters the forest. Immediately afterwards the stream becomes a swampy brook . The stream sporadically emerges and disappears again, flowing through the valley section of the forest, and through the natural monument stone gutter ("Felsentäle") in the Hartwald. The stream then continues in a westerly direction and picks up the almost equally long Annenbach from the right, at the edge of the forest. In the corridor, the shorter Krebsbach flows out of the Hartwald into the Talbach, which is already near the northern outskirts of Menningen. The Weiherbach inlet then joins the stream from the northeast, at which point, the Talbach pivots. After another approximately 700 meters, it flows through the village, joining the Ablach from the left about 592 m above sea level.

== See also ==
- List of rivers of Baden-Württemberg
