= Jan von Holleben =

German photographer (born 1977)

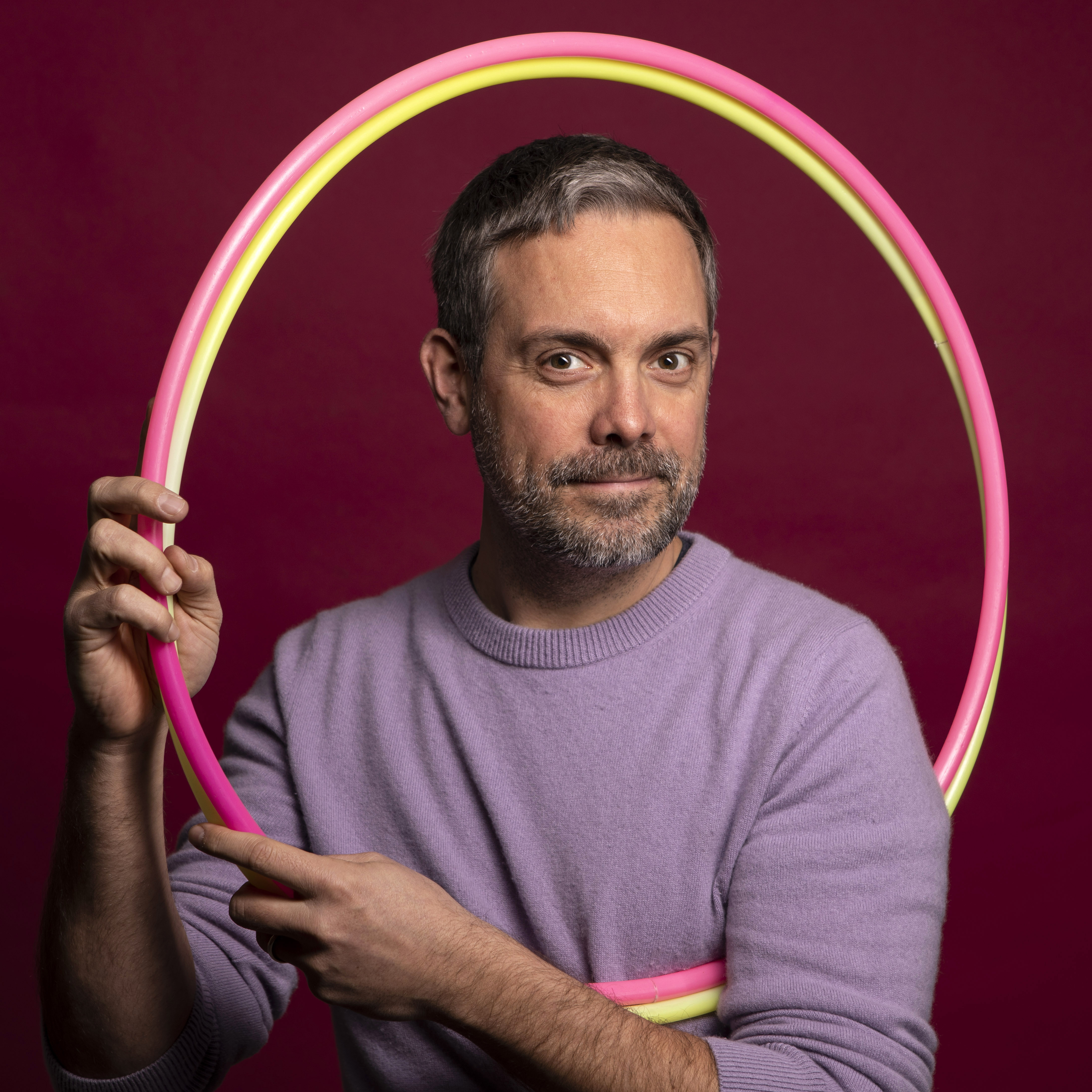
Jan von Holleben, 2020 (by Anna Schäflein)

Jan von Holleben (born 1977) is a German photographer.

== Life and work ==
Born in 1977 and brought up in the southern German countryside, he lived most of his youth in an alternative commune near Freiburg and identifies a strong connection between the development of his photographic work and the influence of his parents, a cinematographer and child therapist. At the age of 13, he followed his father's photographic career picking up a camera and experimenting with all sorts of "magical tricks", developing his photographic imagination and skills with friends and family and later honing his technique in commercial settings.

After pursuing studies in teaching children with disabilities at the Pädagogische Hochschule in Freiburg, he moved to London, earned a degree in the Theory and History of Photography at Surrey Institute of Art and Design, and became submerged within the London photographic scene, where he worked as picture editor, art director and photographic director. He quickly set up two photographic collectives, Young Photographers United and photodebut, followed more recently by The Photographer's Office. His body of photographic work focusing on the ‘homo ludens’ – the man who learns through play, is itself built from a playful integration of pedagogical theory with his own personal experiences of play and memories of childhood.

Jan von Holleben's work has been exhibited internationally and published widely throughout the world.

His work has been published amongst others in Die Zeit, Spiegel Wissen, Dein Spiegel, Chrismon, Neon, Creative Review, Dazed& Confused, Diva, Day 4, Dummy, Emotion, Geo, Geolino, Zeit Magazin, Zeit Campus, Adbusters, Art Review, Bant, Brigitte, Dumbo Feather, DPI, IDN, Irish Times, Label, Liberation, Max, Next Level, Ojodepez, Photo Review, Photography, Repubblica, Rojo, Style 100, The Face, The Sunday Review, Sleazenation, SZ-Magazin, Vice, Vogue Girl and many more.

== Education ==
- 1997 Baccalaureate Diploma (A-Levels) – Martin-Schongauer-Gymnasium_Breisach, Breisach
- 1997–2000 Photographic Apprentice – Prisma Productions, Freiburg
- 1999–2000 Studies in Teaching Children with Disabilities – Pädagogische Hochschule, Freiburg
- 2000–2002 BA (Hons) Photography (Theory and History) – SIAD University, Farnham

== Book publications ==
- 11-21, The Photographer's Office, London, 2007. ISBN 978-0-9554470-1-3
- Dreams of Flying, The Photographer's Office, London, 2007. ISBN 978-0-9554470-0-6
- Träume vom Fliegen, Hoffmann & Campe, Hamburg, 2008. ISBN 978-3455380446
- The Snowbed, The Photographer's Office, London, 2008. ISBN 978-0-9554470-2-0
- Dreams of Flying vol.2, The Photographer's Office, London, 2009. ISBN 978-0-9554470-3-7
- Mutatis Mutandis, The Photographer's Office, London, 2010. ISBN 978-0-9554470-4-4
- HO HO HO, The Photographer's Office, Berlin, 2011. ISBN 978-0-9554470-6-8
- Kriegen das eigentlich alle? Gabriel Verlag im Thienemann Verlag, Stuttgart, 2013. ISBN 978-3522304412
- Konrad Wimmel ist da! Gabriel Verlag im Thienemann-Esslinger Verlag, Stuttgart, 2014. ISBN 978-3522303989
- Kinderlieder aus Deutschland und Europa, Carus Verlag & Gabriel Verlag im Thienemann-Esslinger Verlag, Stuttgart, 2014. ISBN 978-3522303828
- Does that happen to everyone? Gestalten Verlag, Berlin, 2014. ISBN 978-3899555219
- DENKSTE?! Gabriel Verlag im Thienemann Verlag, Stuttgart, 2014. ISBN 978-3522303477
- mit Jane Baer-Krause: Wie heißt dein Gott eigentlich mit Nachnamen? Gabriel Verlag im Thienemann-Esslinger Verlag, Stuttgart, 2015. ISBN 978-3-522-30404-7
- That’s what you think! Gestalten Verlag, Berlin, 2015. ISBN 978-3899557251
- WWWas? Gabriel Verlag im Thienemann-Esslinger Verlag, Stuttgart, 2016. ISBN 978-3522304474
- ABC Photography, Tarzipan Verlag, Berlin, 2016. ISBN 978-0-9554470-7-5
- Und was wird jetzt mit mir? Gabriel Verlag im Thienemann-Esslinger Verlag, Stuttgart, 2016. ISBN 978-3522304726
- KOSMOS, Little Steidl Verlag, Göttingen, 2017. ISBN 978-3944630014
- Wenn ich KanzlerIn von Deutschland wär, Gabriel Verlag im Thienemann-Esslinger Verlag, Stuttgart, 2017. ISBN 978-3522304818
- Monsterhelden, Beltz Verlag, Weinheim, 2017. ISBN 978-3407823175
- Meine Wilde Wut, Beltz Verlag, Weinheim, 2018. ISBN 978-3407754219
- Mach mit! Carlsen Verlag, Hamburg, 2018. ISBN 978-3551252074
- ALLES IMMER - das Bilderbuch, Beltz Verlag, Weinheim, 2019. ISBN 978-3-407-75453-0
- ALWAYS EVERYTHING - the picture book, Tarzipan books, 2019. ISBN 978-0955447082
- Wie geht Politik? Gabriel Verlag im Thienemann-Esslinger Verlag, Stuttgart, 2021. ISBN 978-3522305921

== Awards ==
- 2014: Wissenschaftsbuch des Jahres / Wien
- 2010: Lens Culture Award – Honorable Mention / San Francisco
- 2009: Aesthetica Award – Runner up / London
- 2009: Unicum Award – Best Ad / Bochum
- 2009: Lead Award – Auszeichnung / Hamburg
- 2008: Backlight Artist’s Residency, Finland
- 2008: Bronze – Idn + graniph Universe Award / Tokyo
- 2008: Nomination – Joop Swart Master Class, Amsterdam
- 2007: Photography Masters Cup/ London-Beverly Hills
- 2007: PHE07 Best Photography Books of 2007 for ‘Dreams of Flying’/ Madrid
- 2007: Gold – PX3 Photography Award / Paris
- 2007: Gold – Best CP Award / Munich
- 2007: Finalist – Cedefop Award / Thessaloniki
- 2007: Gold – Art for Aid Award / Amsterdam
- 2006: International Photography Award / Los Angeles
- 2006: Young Portfolio Award / Kiyosato
- 2006: Free Range Photographic Ambassador / London
- 2006: Magenta Award / Toronto
- 2006: Honours – Hyeres Festivale de la Photographie / Hyeres
- 2006: Gold – Lead Award / Hamburg
- 2006: Festimage / Chaves
- 2006: Photoreview Award / Langhorne
- 2004: London Photographic Award / London
- 2004: The Observer Hodge Photographic Award / London
- 2004: International Photography Award / Los Angeles
- 1998: FotoSalon Preis / Kirchzarten

== Permanent installations ==
- V&A Museum of Childhood, London, UK, 2006
- John Radcliffe Children Hospital, Oxford, UK, 2014
- Charité Children Cancer Ward, Berlin, Germany, 2015
- Demelza, children hospice, Kent, UK, 2016
- AIDA Perla, International, 2018
- SOS Children's Village International Embassy, Berlin, Germany, 2018
- Charité Palliativ Care Unit, Berlin, Germany, 2019
- Boston Children's Hospital, Boston, USA, 2021

== Exhibitions (selection) ==
- 2020 Always Everything, V&A Museum of Childhood, London
- 2019 Alles Immer, Freiburg/ Reutlingen/ Langenau/ Bad Saulgau/ Bodelshausen/ Walddorfhäslach/ Rottenburg am Neckar, Germany
- 2016 Homo Ludens, in der Tulla, Mannheim
- 2015 Magic Bodø, Parkart Festival, Bodø
- 2014 The Amazing Analogue, The Brighton Photo Biennial, Hove Museum, Brighton
- 2012: Lily & Jonathan, John Radcliffe Children Hospital, Oxford
- 2010 Best of 000-010, Gesto, Porto
- 2010: Nur gespielt, Städtische Galerie Friedrichsbau, Bühl
- 2009: Mutatis Mutandis, Farmani Gallery, New York
- 2009: Liebesorte, C/O Berlin
- 2008: It'll happen here, Marcia Wood Gallery, Atlanta
- 2007: Wir werden immer größer, Peter Hay Helpert Fine Art, New York
- 2007: Dreams of Flying, V&A Museum of Childhood, London
- 2006: Dreams of Flying, Peter Hay Helpert Fine Art, New York (K)
- 2005: Dreams of Flying, Nogoodwindow, Paris
- 2001: The Apricot, Kunstverein Kirchzarten, Kirchzarten

== Images ==
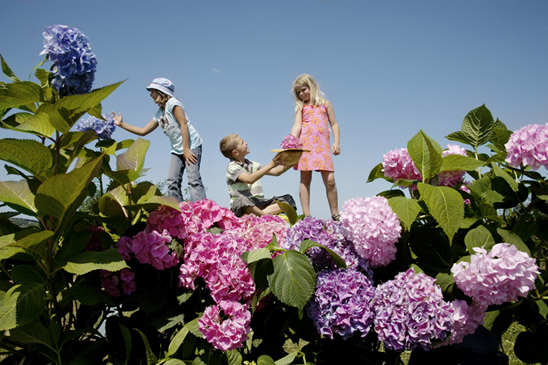
The Flowers from Journey to everywhere

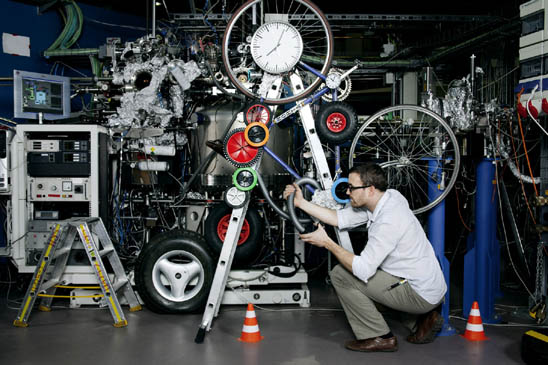
Particle Acclerator from Latteral Thinking

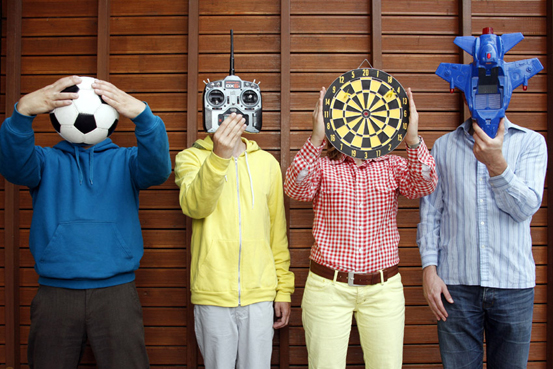
Gameboys and Girls

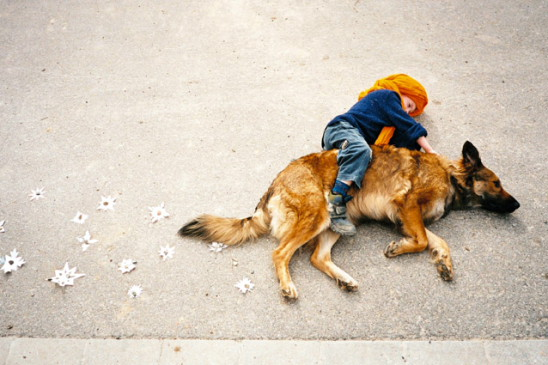
The dog rider from the series Dreams of Flying

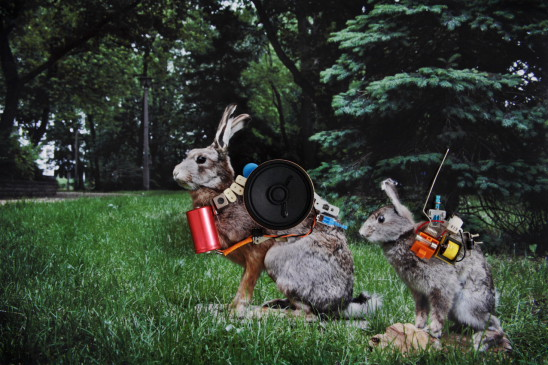
Rabby and Bunny from the series Cyborg Pets
