= Grabenbach (Ablach) =

River in Germany

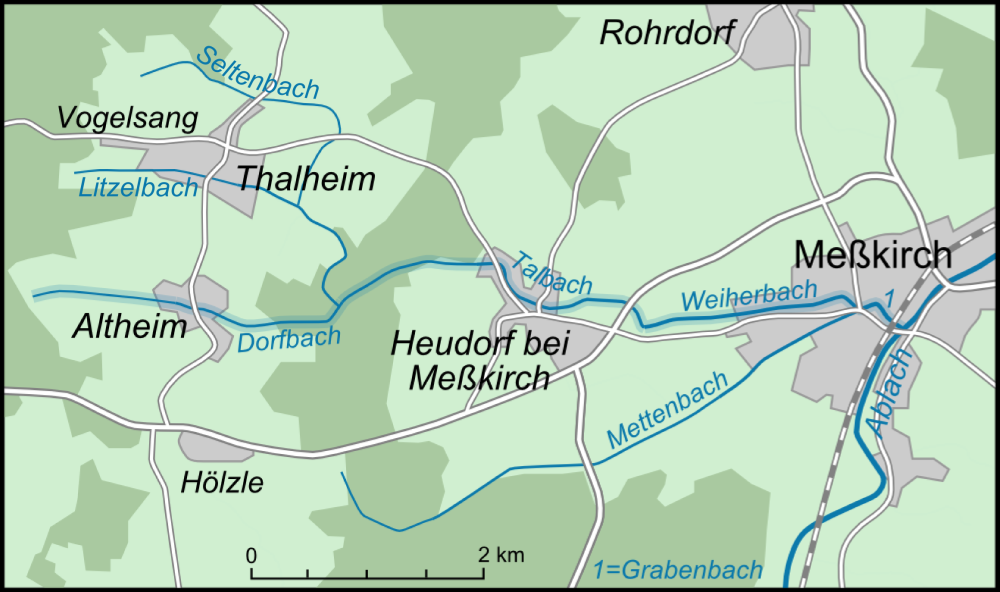

Location
- Country: Germany
- States: Baden-Württemberg

Physical characteristics
- Mouth
  - location: Ablach
  - coordinates: 47.9931°N 9.1158°E
- Length: 8.4 km (5.2 mi)

Basin features
- Progression: Ablach→ Danube→ Black Sea

Grabenbach is a river of Baden-Württemberg, Germany.

The Grabenbach is a left tributary of the Ablach in Meßkirch. During its course, it changed its name several times: Dorfbach, Talbach, Weiherbach, Mühlenbach, Stadtbach, Grabenbach; in former times partly also Heudorfer Bach; this is also how it is called on its entire length by Baden-Württemberg's authority for water protection.

== See also ==
- List of rivers of Baden-Württemberg
