= Andelsbach =

River in Germany

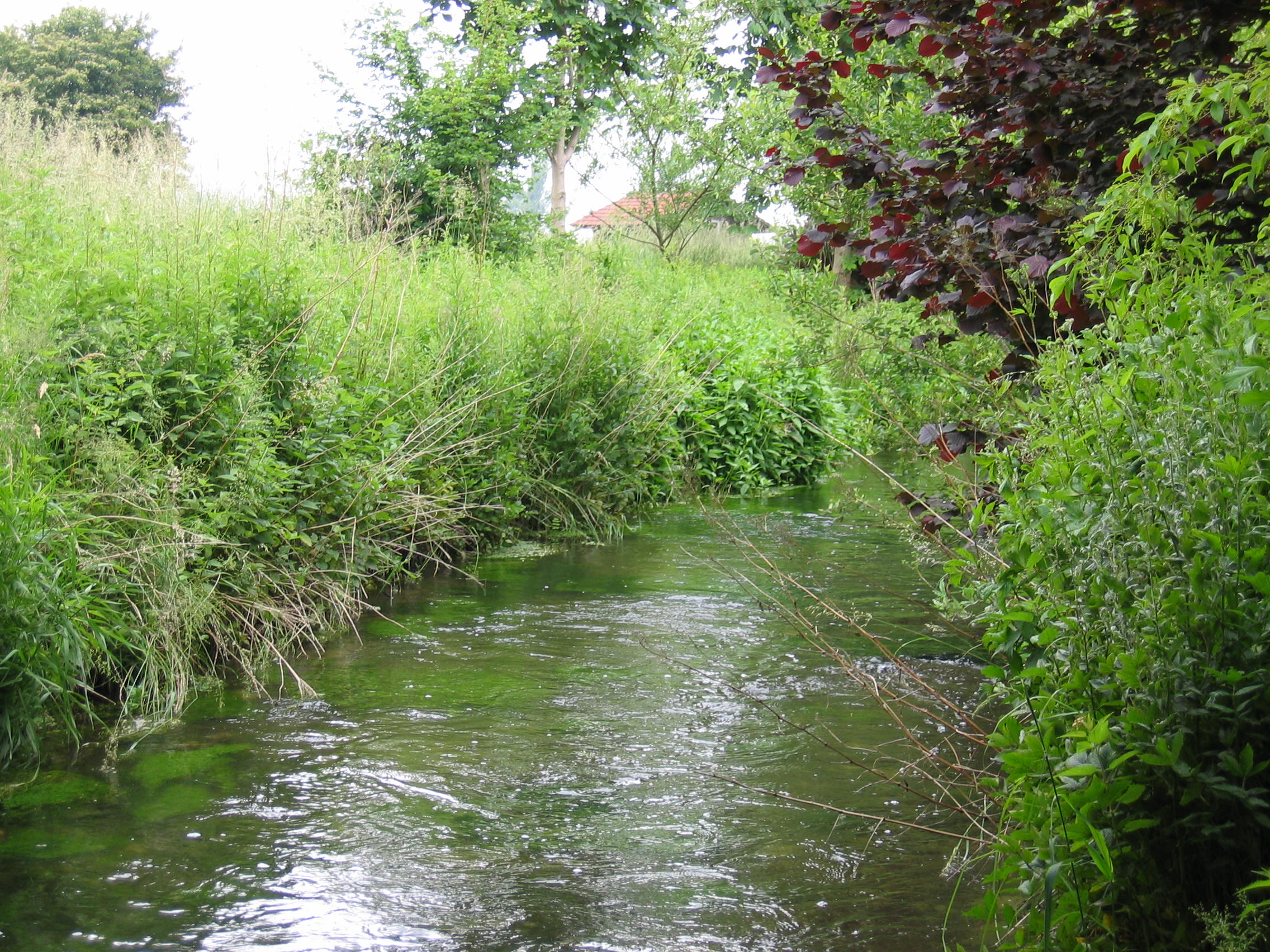
- The Andelsbach at Hausen am Andelsbach (a part of Krauchenwies)

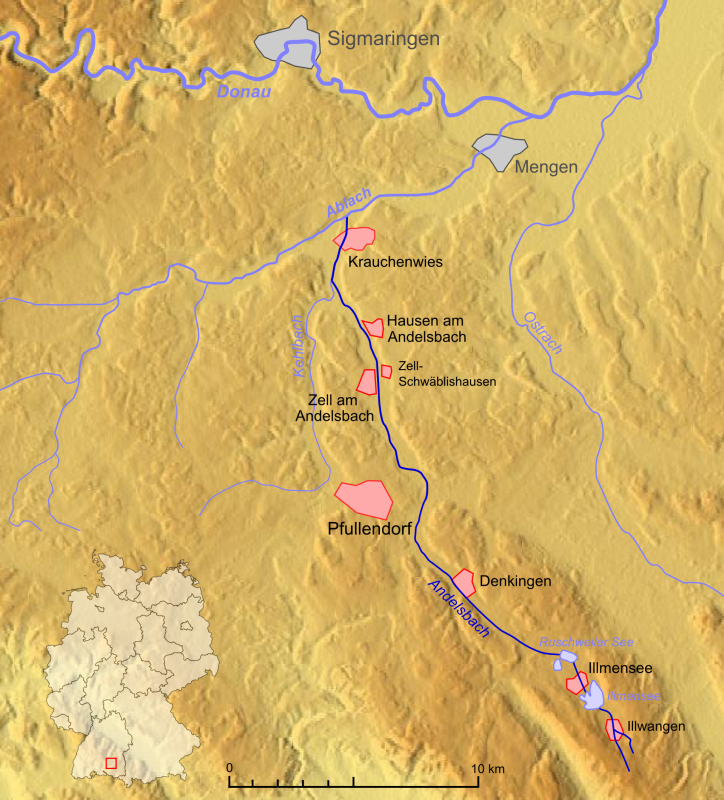

Location
- Country: Germany
- State: Baden-Württemberg

Physical characteristics
- Mouth
  - location: Ablach
  - coordinates: 48.0278°N 9.2439°E
- Length: 29.7 km (18.5 mi)

Basin features
- Progression: Ablach→ Danube→ Black Sea

The Andelsbach is a 30 km long river in Baden-Württemberg, Germany. It flows into the Ablach in Krauchenwies. The name Andelsbach was first mentioned in writing in 1236 as Andolfspach. It is therefore derived from a personal name.

== See also ==
- List of rivers of Baden-Württemberg
