= Erlenbach (Enz) =

River in Germany

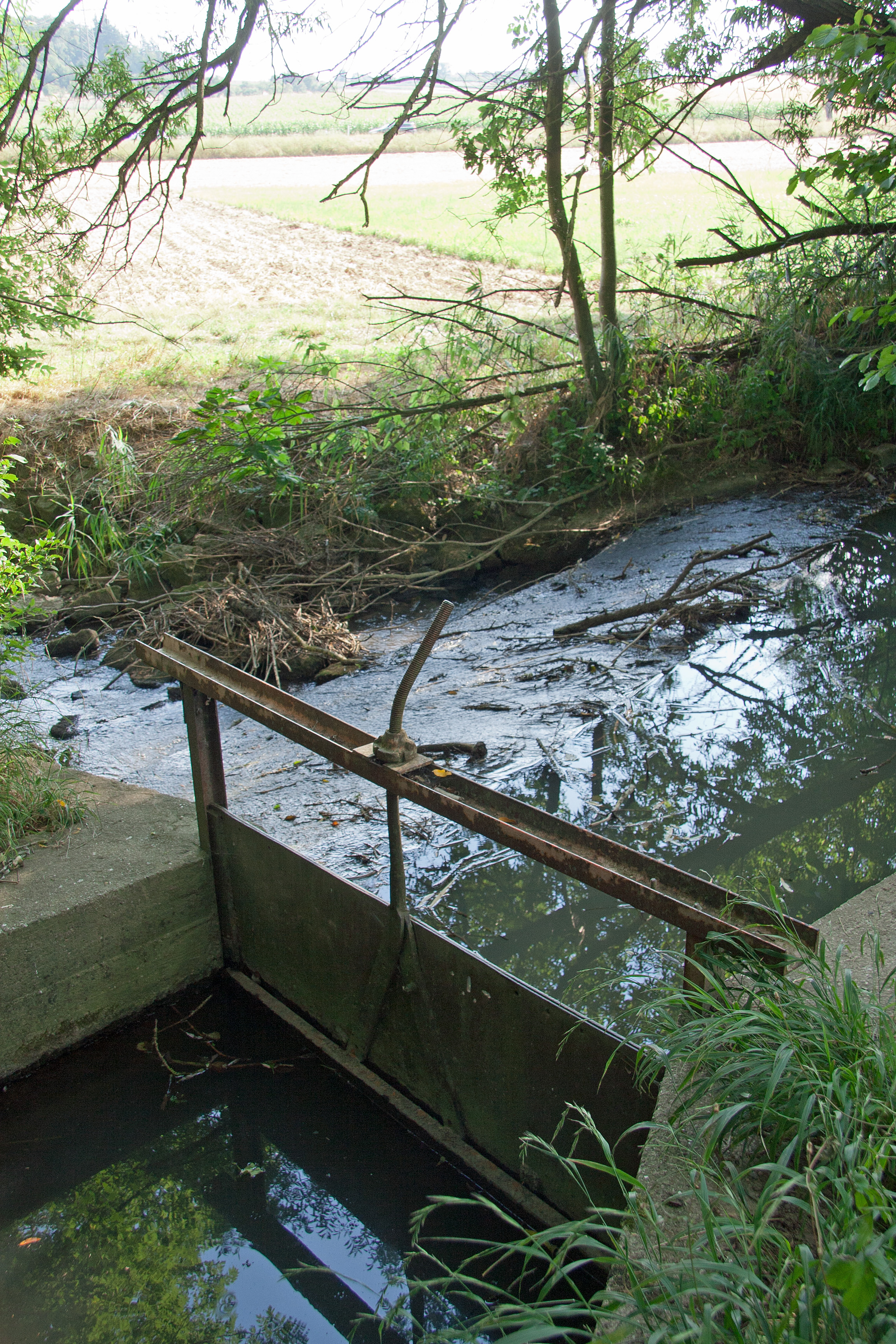

Location
- Country: Germany
- State: Baden-Württemberg

Physical characteristics
- Mouth
  - location: Enz
  - coordinates: 48.9447°N 8.8399°E
- Length: 11.2 km (7.0 mi)

Basin features
- Progression: Enz→ Neckar→ Rhine→ North Sea

The Erlenbach (German: [ˈɛʁlənbax]) is a river of Baden-Württemberg, Germany. It is a left tributary of the Enz at Mühlacker.

== See also ==
- List of rivers of Baden-Württemberg
