= Wald, Baden-Württemberg =

Wald
- Municipality
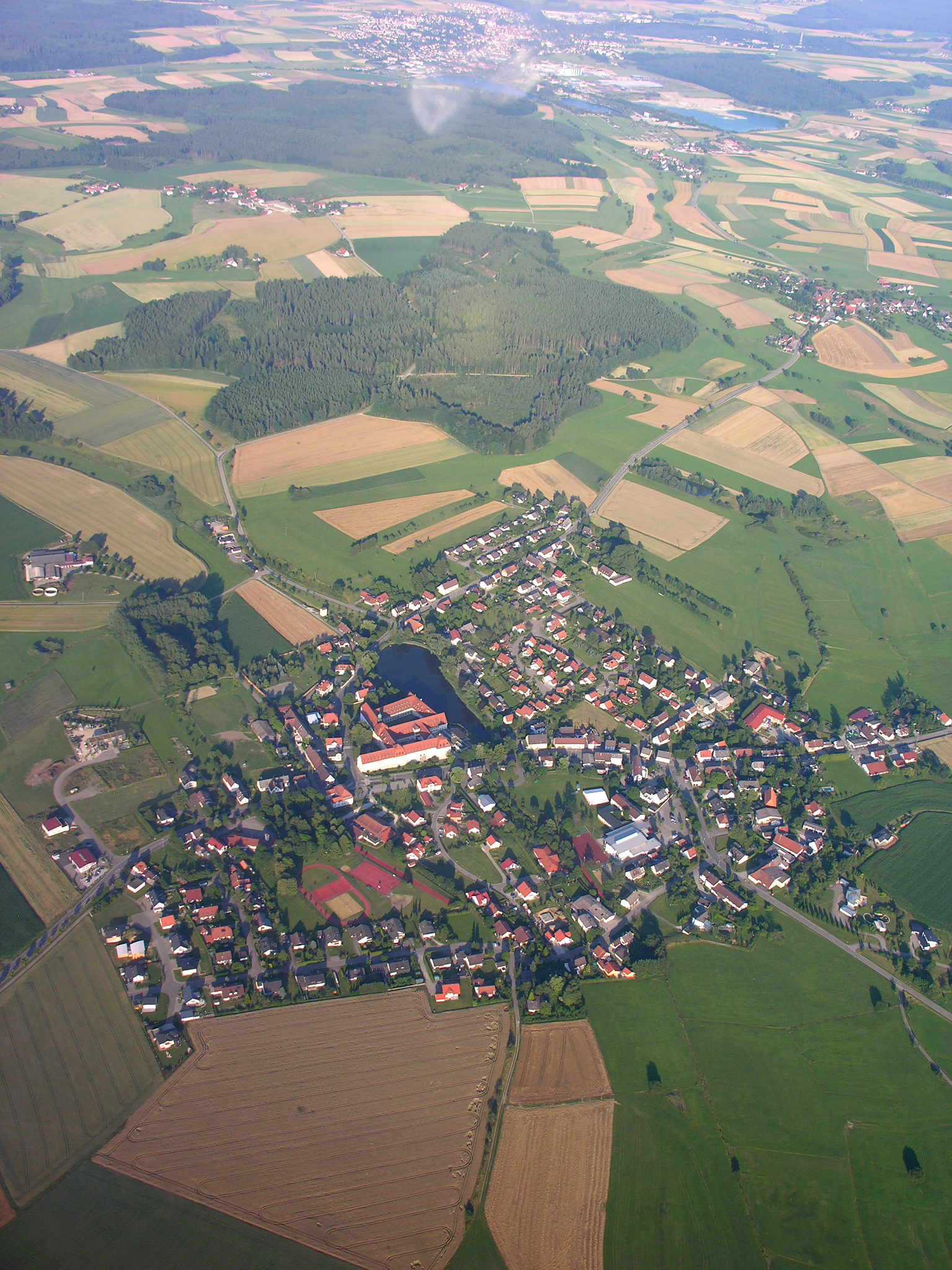
- Wald (2008)

- Coat of arms

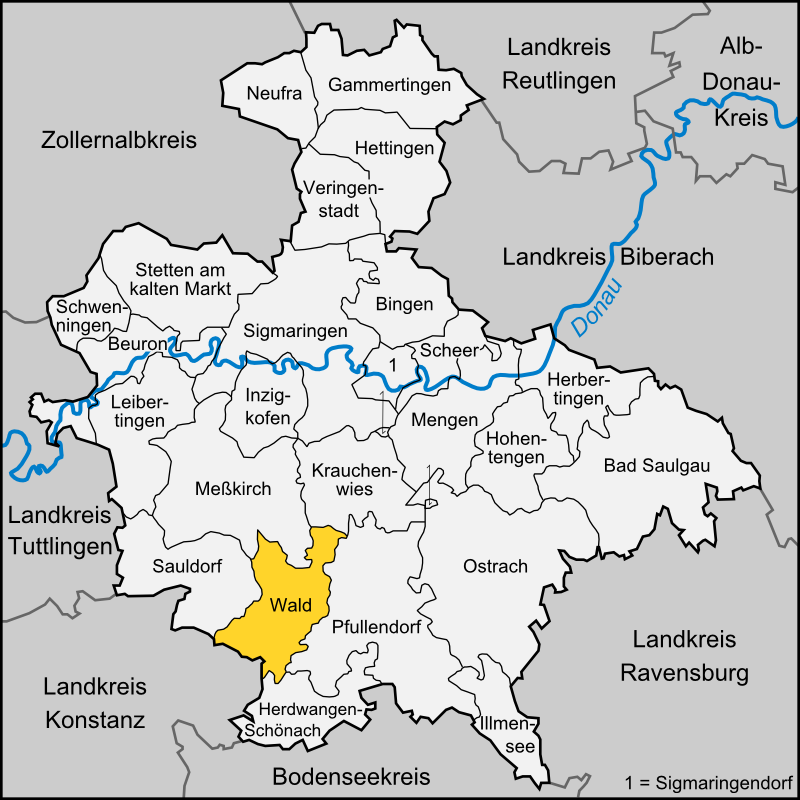
- Location of Wald within Sigmaringen district
- Interactive map of Wald
- Location within Germany Location within Baden-Württemberg
- Coordinates: 47°56′12″N 9°10′24″E
- Country: Germany
- State: Baden-Württemberg
- Admin. region: Tübingen
- District: Sigmaringen

Government
  - Mayor (2020–28): Joachim Grüner

Area
  - Total: 43.85 km^{2} (16.93 sq mi)
- Elevation: 657 m (2,156 ft)

Population (2025-12-31)
  - Total: 2,755
  - Density: 62.83/km^{2} (162.7/sq mi)
- Time zone: UTC+01:00 (CET)
  - Summer (DST): UTC+02:00 (CEST)
- Postal codes: 88639
- Dialling codes: 07578
- Vehicle registration: SIG
- Website: www.wald-hohenzollern.de

Wald (German pronunciation: [valt]) is a municipality in the district of Sigmaringen in Baden-Württemberg in Germany.

Coat of arms	District	Inhabitants (2010)	Size
Wald	Wald (main locality)	843	827,47 ha
Glashütte	Glashütte	97	178,66 ha
Hippetsweiler	Hippetsweiler	201	348,73 ha
Kappel	Kappel	105	334,66 ha
Reischach	Reischach	67	217,61 ha
Riedetsweiler	Riedetsweiler	83	203,61 ha
Rothenlachen	Rothenlachen	38	217,26 ha
Ruhestetten	Ruhestetten	174	643,29 ha
Sentenhart	Sentenhart	340	575,80 ha
Walbertsweiler	Walbertsweiler	639	839,57 ha

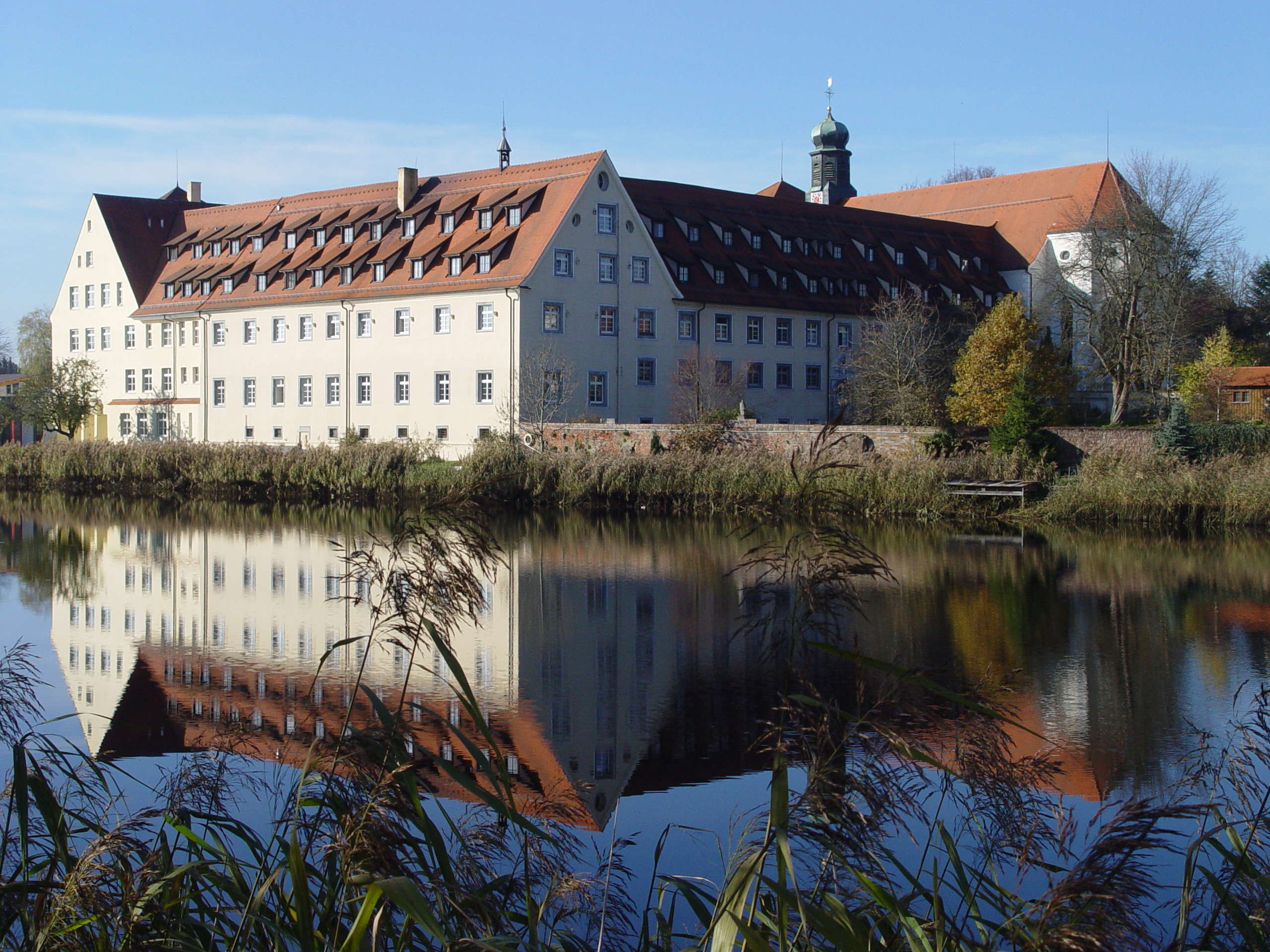
Wald monastery

== Girl School ==
=== Kloster Wald ===
The students get to know the different workshops in a trial week in class 8. They can decide for one of the artisanal trainings according to their interests and abilities. The training starts parallel to school in class 9 on one afternoon per week until the graduation. After that, the training continues in theory and practice full-time until ensuing spring.

=== Staate journeyman's examinations ===
body under public law, the proper Chamber of Crafts.
