= Ablach (Danube) =

River in Germany

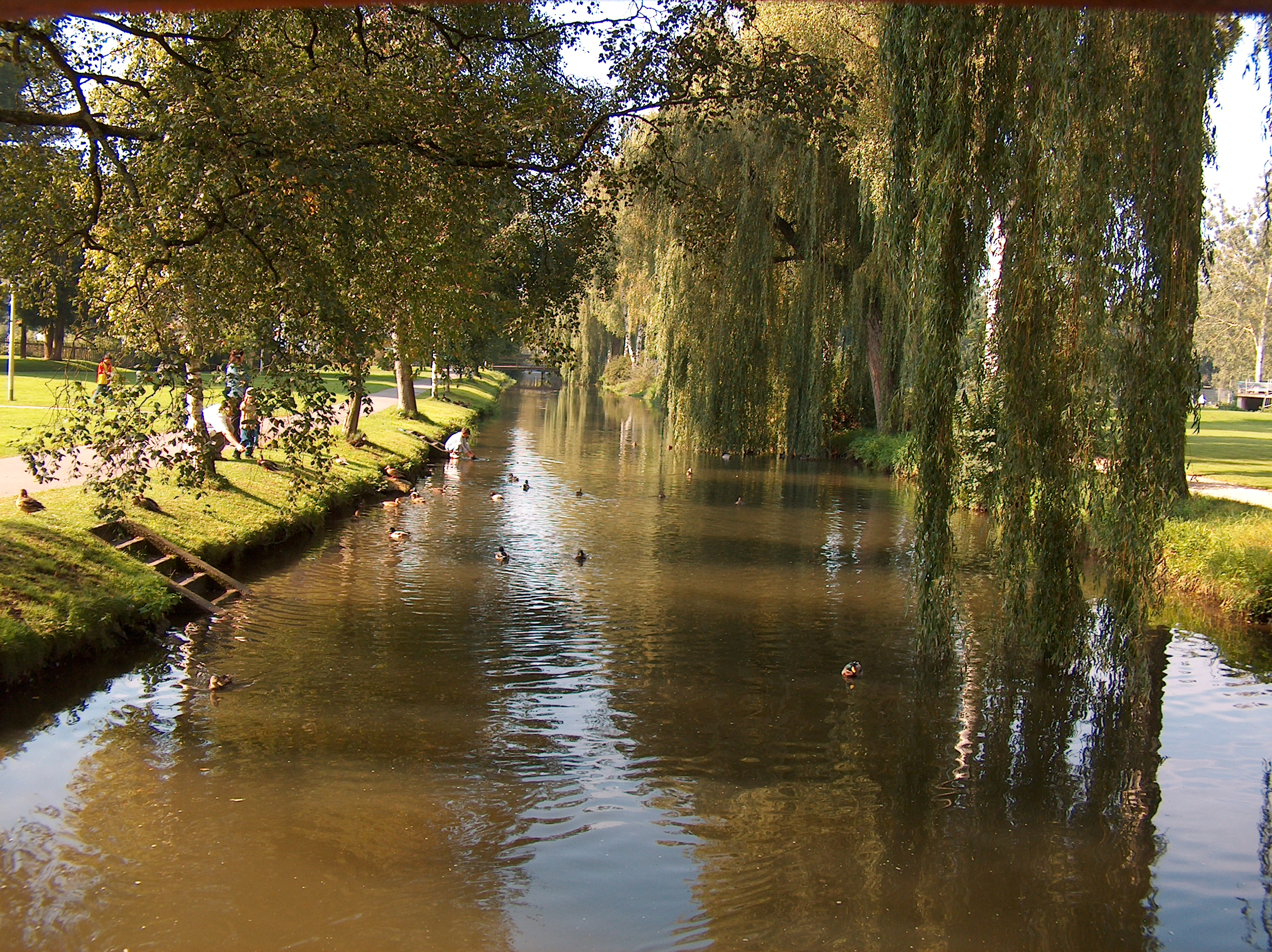
- The Ablach on its way through Mengen

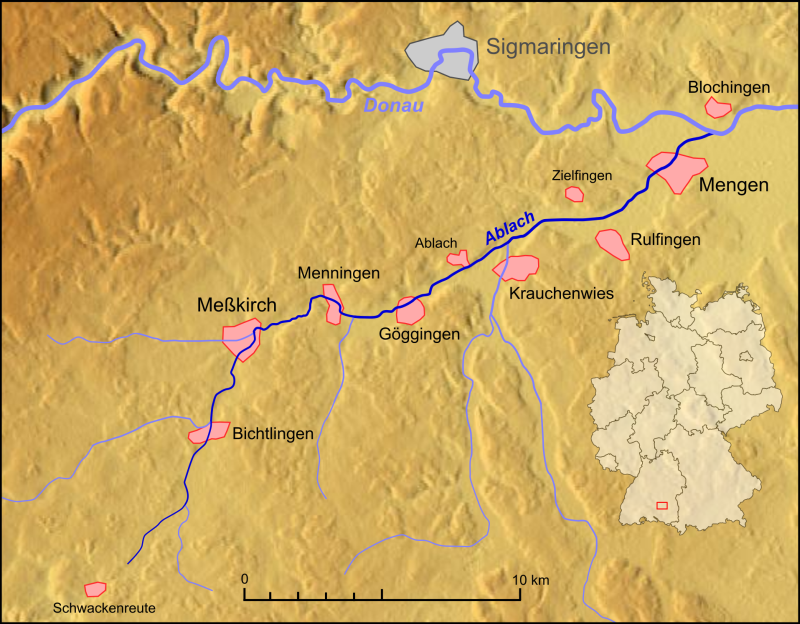
- Course of the Ablach

Location
- Country: Germany
- Location: Sigmaringen

Physical characteristics
- Source
  - location: West of Liggersdorf
  - coordinates: 47°52′56″N 9°6′3″E
- Mouth
  - location: Confluence with Danube at Mengen-Blochingen
  - coordinates: 48°3′48″N 9°20′44″E
- Length: 32.4 km (20.1 mi)
- Basin size: 435 km^{2} (168 sq mi)

Basin features
- Progression: Danube→ Black Sea
- Tributaries
  - left: Alte Ablach, Rubelisbach, Seewaldbach, Krummbach, Grabenbach, Teuerbach, Talbach
  - right: Gröbelgraben, Rinkenbach, Auenbach, Nollenbach, Aspenbach, Ringgenbach, Lautenbach, Talbach (Ablach, Göggingen), Andelsbach

The Ablach is a river of Baden-Württemberg, Germany, a right tributary of the Danube. It rises on the European Watershed, which is only a hint in this area, from the Mindersdorfer Aach in the municipality of Hohenfels in the Landkreis of Konstanz. It is about 32 kilometres (20 mi) long.

== Geology ==
During the Riss ice age, about 120,000 years ago, the Ablach flowed into the Danube at Engelswies, because its original valley was covered by the ice. The ice blocked the Danube, and the Danube formed a lake between Geisingen and Spaichingen. When the water level of this lake reached 667 metres (2,188 ft) above mean sea level, it overflowed into the Neckar valley at Spaichingen. About 100,000 years ago, the ice melted and the Ablach took its current course.

Before it was straightened, the Ablach meandered through its valley. The Ablach Valley in the broadest sense is the area between the Großer Heuberg in the north and the Linzgau in the south

== Course ==
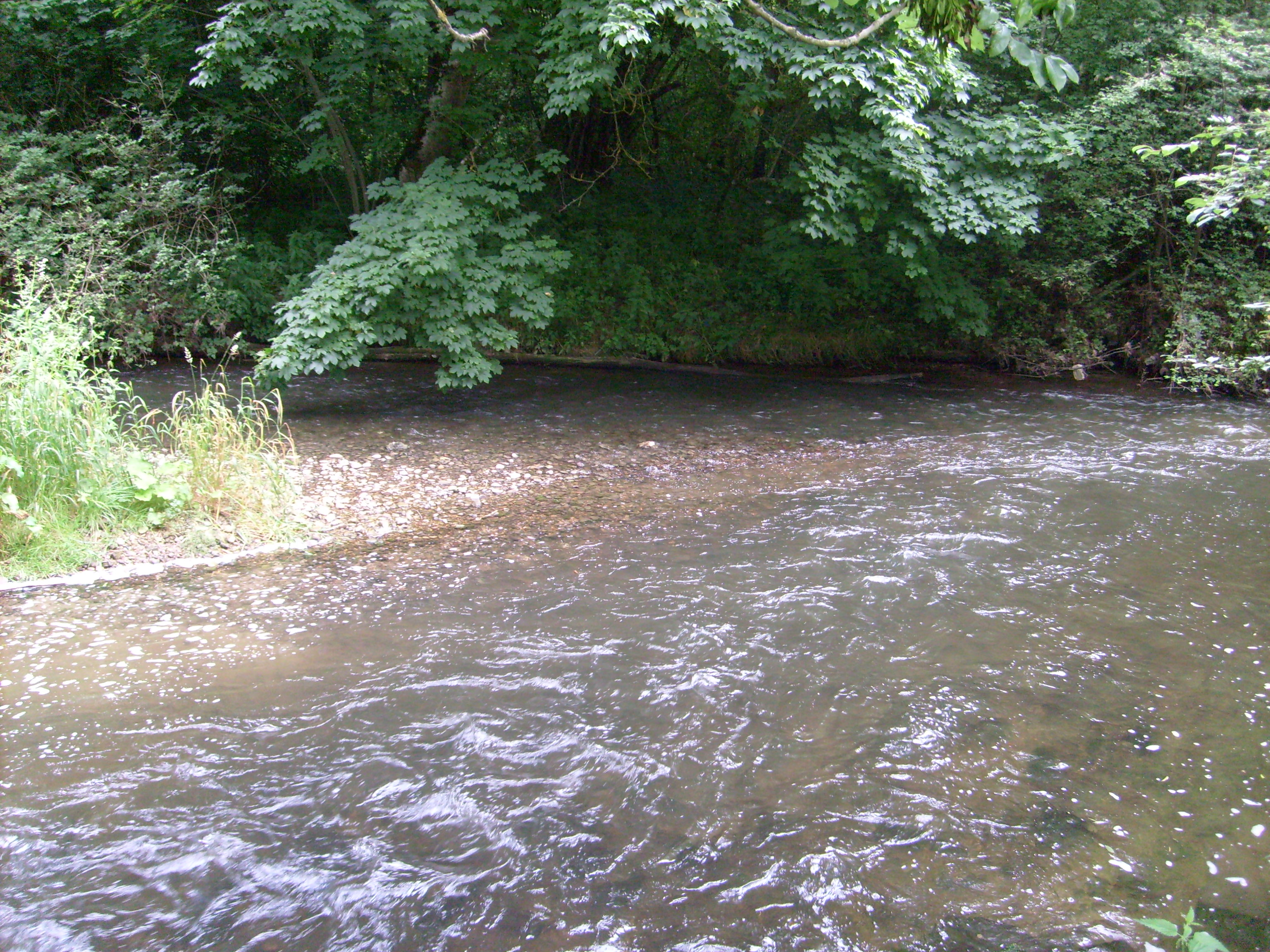
The confluence of the Andelsbach (front) and Ablach (rear)

The upper reaches of the Ablach flow through the Schwackenreute Plateau, past the towns of Bichtlingen and Schnerkingen. In Meßkirch, the Grabenbach joins from the left. the Ablach then flows past Igelsweis and Menningen, where, in the Middle Ages, the Ablach fed the moat around the water castle. Before Göggingen, the Ringgenbach joins from the right and some of the Ablach's water is diverted into a mill channel. Past Göggingen, this channel joins the Ablach again.

The Ablach then flows past a village named after it, Ablach, and then towards Krauchenwies and through the local royal park. After Krauchenwies, it flows in a graded bed past Zielfingen, amidst a collection of water-filled gravel pits. A weir near the Südsee III restaurant diverts some the Ablach's water into a channel where it drives a water mill and a saw mill. Past this sawmill, the water is led back to the Ablach, only to be diverted again for the next saw mill. The diverted water then flows through Mengen, while the original course flows through Ennetach. The two streams are reunited south of Blochingen, shortly before the Ablach flows into the Danube.

The last 800 metres (2,600 ft) of the Ablach flows along a former bed of the Danube. This arm of the Danube was cut off when the Danube was straightened.

== The Mindersdorfer Aach, watershed and bifurcation ==
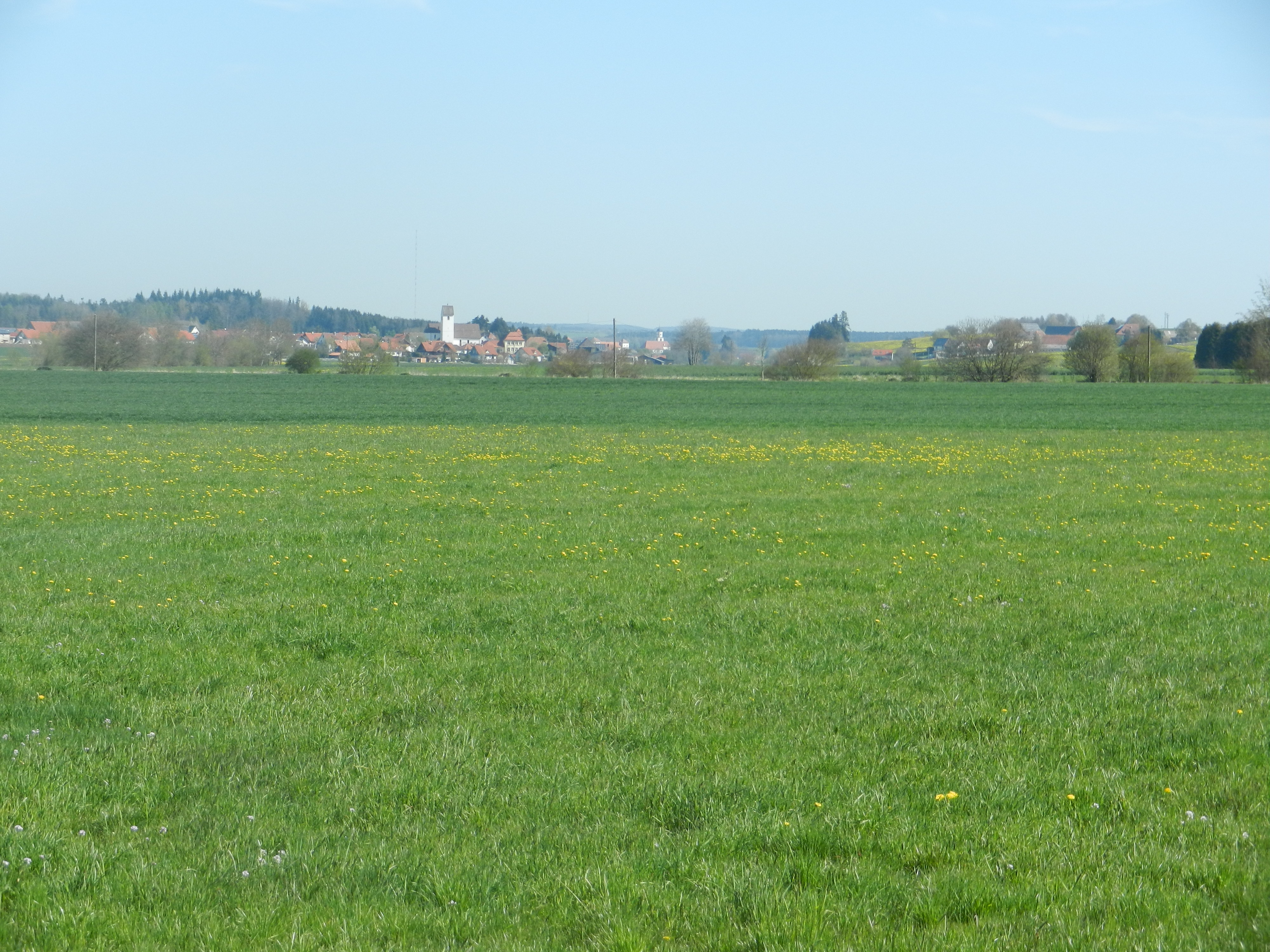
Upper Ablach valley

The headwaters that are currently the upper part of the Mindersdorfer Aach were originally the headwaters of the Ablach. The Stockacher Aach had a favourable gradient for use in a hydropower plant and to drive several sawmills and a forge. However the Stockacher Aach does not naturally carry enough water to drive all of these, which is why as early as 1699, a canal was dug across the European Watershed to divert the water of the upper Ablach into the Mindersdorfer Aach. A canal of only 100 metres (330 ft) across the Schwackenreute Plateau was all that it took to accomplish this. This effectively moved the European watershed, annexing the upper Ablach into the catchment area of the Rhine. Strictly speaking, the weir at the start of the canal creates an artificial bifurcation: most of the water is diverted via the Stockacher Aach to Lake Constance, but in times of heavy rainfall, the excess water follows the original course of the Ablach to the Danube.

== History ==
People settled early in the fertile lands bordering the Ablach, in which traces of Celtic, Roman and Alamanni villages have been found. The name Ablach is probably derived from the Celtic Abela, which means something like "brook".

In the fifth and sixth century, the Alamanni established villages in the more suitable places. These villages can be recognized by the fact that they have names ending in "-ingen": Göggingen, Menningen, Schnerkingen, Bichtlingen.

Later the Ablach Valley gained importance because of its supply of wood and because the soil quality made it suitable for growing cereal. The annual spring floods ensured adequate fertilization. In the past century, the Ablach Valley became an important center for gravel mining.

The course of the Ablach has been adjusted several times. A few kilometers of the headwaters have been diverted into the Stockacher Aach, reducing the catchment area of the Ablach by about 20 square kilometres (7.7 mi^{2}). Curiously, the upper part of the Ablach as it flows through Zizenhausen was still called Ablach as late as 1857.

The course of the river was again altered during construction of the Hegau-Ablach Valley Railway line, between 1866 and 1870 from Stockach to Meßkirch and between 1870 and 1873 from Meßkirch via Krauchenwies to Mengen. The line runs along the Ablach and crosses it several times. Room for the Ablach was further restricted by road construction, in particular the construction of Federal road 311. Road construction and the alteration of the habitat for agricultural purposes gave the landscape in the valley its current shape. The section of the Ablach between Menningen and Göggingen was improved after repeated flooding; in 1910 it was widened to 12 metres (39 ft), at a cost of 150000gold marks. The exploitation of gravel pits has also led to changes in the course of the Ablach.

== Water level ==
The water level of the Ablach is measured by the regierungsbezirk Tübingen measured in three locations: one measuring device is in Menningen and two in Mengen, where the Ennetach and Mengen distributaries are measured separately.

== Arts ==
On the Schwackereute Plateau, the European Watershed is visually marked by a sculpture called the Wasserscheide-Plastik by Peter Klink, erected in 2007.
