= Krauchenwies =

- Municipality
- Coat of arms

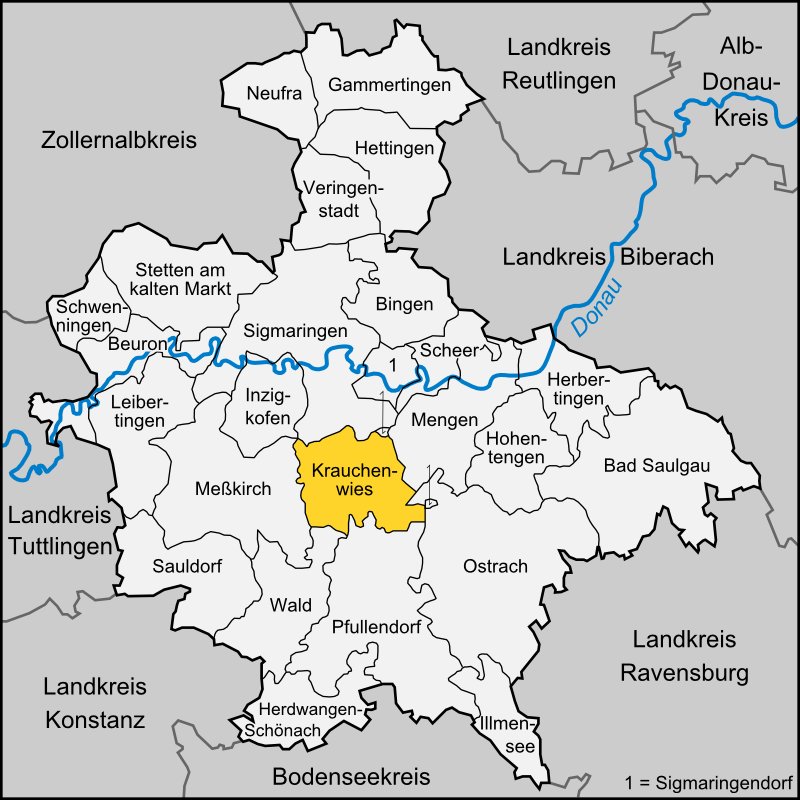
- Location of Krauchenwies within Sigmaringen district
- Interactive map of Krauchenwies
- Location within Germany Location within Baden-Württemberg
- Coordinates: 48°1′1″N 9°15′1″E
- Country: Germany
- State: Baden-Württemberg
- Admin. region: Tübingen
- District: Sigmaringen

Government
  - Mayor (2023–31): Manuel Kern

Area
  - Total: 44.66 km^{2} (17.24 sq mi)
- Elevation: 599 m (1,965 ft)

Population (2025-12-31)
  - Total: 5,060
  - Density: 113/km^{2} (293/sq mi)
- Time zone: UTC+01:00 (CET)
  - Summer (DST): UTC+02:00 (CEST)
- Postal codes: 72505
- Dialling codes: 07576
- Vehicle registration: SIG
- Website: www.krauchenwies.de

Krauchenwies is a municipality in the district of Sigmaringen in Baden-Württemberg in Germany.

== Geography ==
Krauchenwies lies about 10 kilometres (6 mi) south of Sigmaringen and 25 kilometres (16 mi) north of Lake Constance. It is on the Oberschwäbischen Barockstraße (west route) and on the southern edge of the conservation area of Obere Donau.

The Ablach, which originates on the continental divide, flows through town and on to the Danube. The landscape is hilly and wooded, sloping down to the Danube valley.

== History ==
Krauchenwies is first mentioned in a document from the Reichenau monastery in 1202. The name appeared as Cruchinwis (meaning "Cruchin meadow"). By 1216, it had its own parish.

Later, the Lords of Leiterberg took over the village and sold it at the end of the 13th century to the Habsburgs. In 1595, Charles II bought Krauchenwies, which has been closely tied to the county of Sigmaringen ever since. Because Hohenzollern-Sigmaringen lands became Prussian, the town belonged to Prussia starting in 1850.

Since 1975, the town has incorporated six surrounding villages.

== Demographics ==
Population development:

Year	Inhabitants
1990	4595
2001	5070
2011	5018
2021	5096

== Mayors ==
In 1999 Jochen Spieß was elected mayor of Krauchenwies. He was reelected in 2007 and 2015.

- 1963–1999: Heinz Schöllhammer (CDU)
- since 1999: Jochen Spieß (CDU)
