= Meßkirch =

- Town
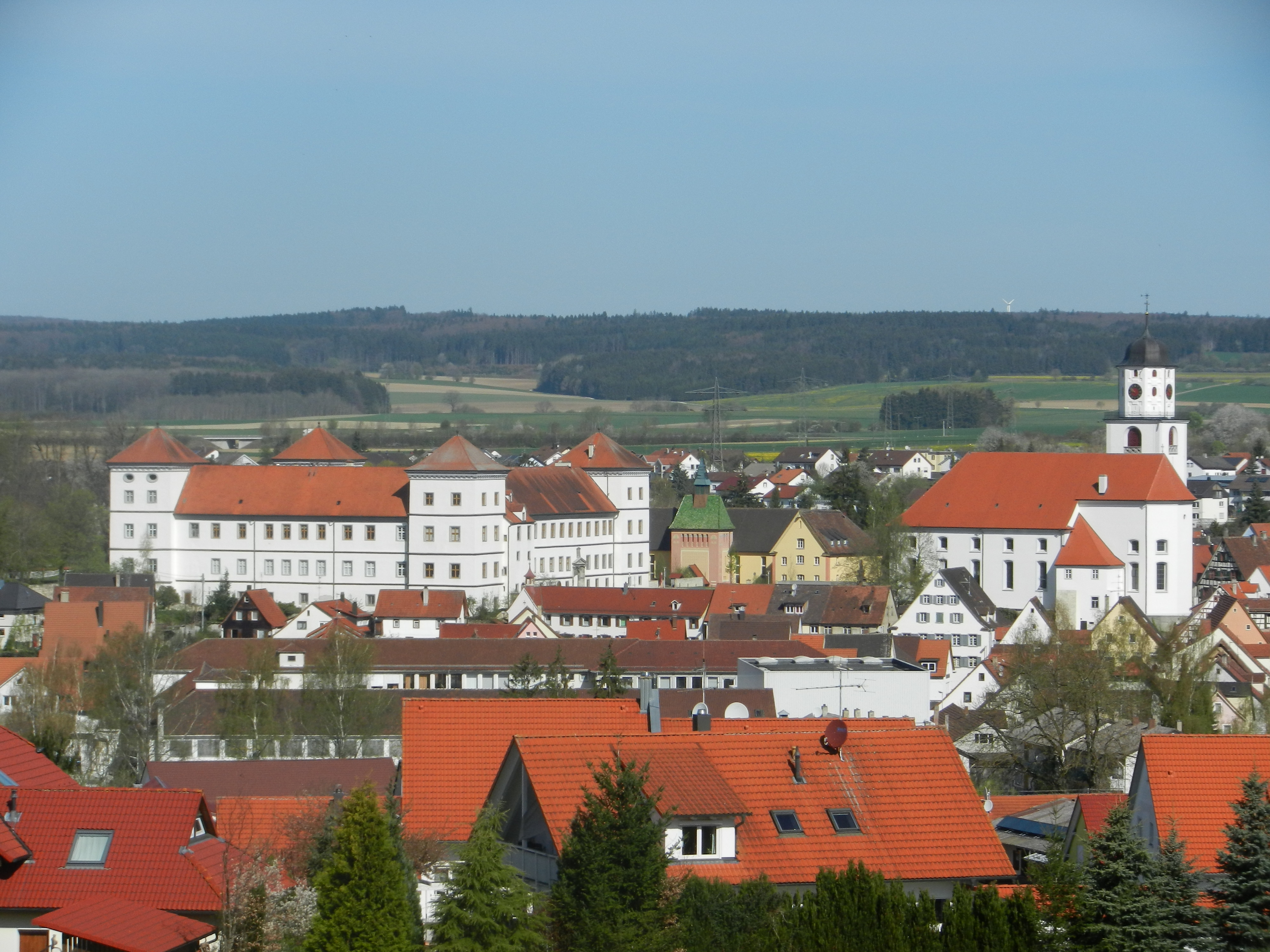

- Coat of arms

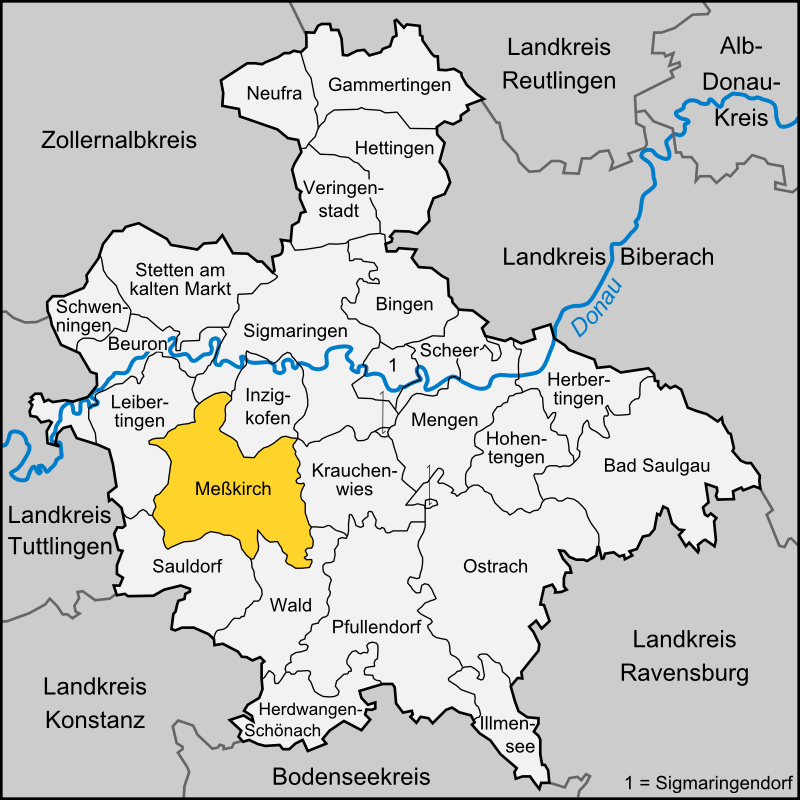
- Location of Meßkirch within Sigmaringen district
- Interactive map of Meßkirch
- Location within Germany Location within Baden-Württemberg
- Coordinates: 47°59′34″N 9°6′45″E
- Country: Germany
- State: Baden-Württemberg
- Admin. region: Tübingen
- District: Sigmaringen
- Subdivisions: 11

Government
  - Mayor (2018–26): Arne Zwick

Area
  - Total: 76.22 km^{2} (29.43 sq mi)
- Elevation: 616 m (2,021 ft)

Population (2025-12-31)
  - Total: 8,776
  - Density: 115.1/km^{2} (298.2/sq mi)
- Time zone: UTC+01:00 (CET)
  - Summer (DST): UTC+02:00 (CEST)
- Postal codes: 88601–88605
- Dialling codes: 07570, 07575, 07578
- Vehicle registration: SIG
- Website: www.messkirch.de

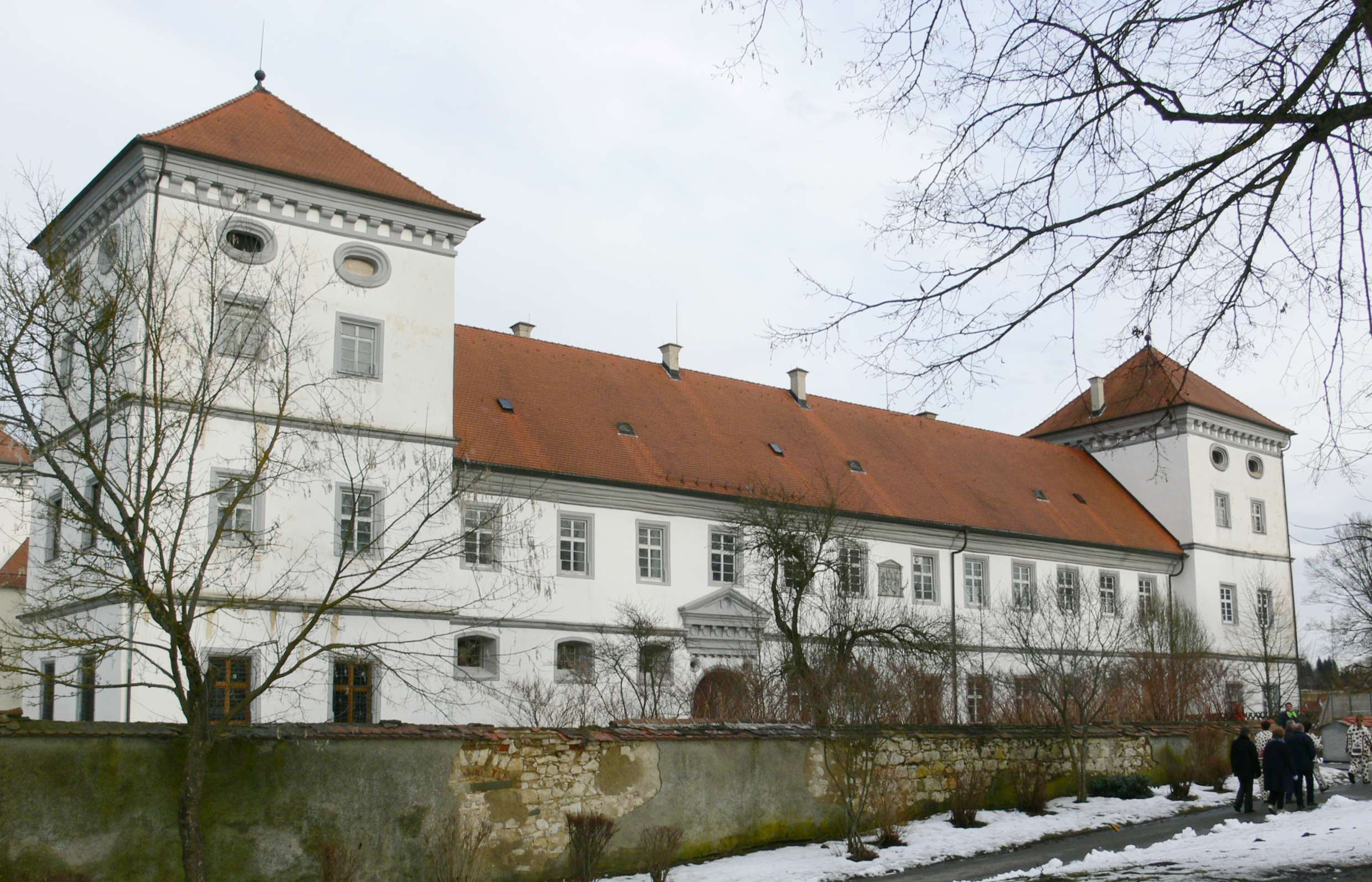
The Renaissance castle at Meßkirch

Meßkirch (German: [ˈmɛsˌkɪʁç]; Swabian: Mässkirch) is a town in the district of Sigmaringen in Baden-Württemberg in Germany.

The town was the residence of the counts of Zimmern, widely known through Count Froben Christoph's Zimmern Chronicle (1559–1566).

== Geography ==
The municipality is composed of following villages and hamlets:

Coat of arms	District	Inhabitants (2010)	Area
Messkirch	Meßkirch (main locality) with Igelswies and Schnerkingen	5660	2465 ha
Dietershofen	Dietershofen♯ with Buffenhofen	147	405 ha
Wappen Heudorf	Heudorf†	338	787 ha
Wappen Langenhart	Langenhart	235	435 ha
Wappen Menningen	Menningen‡ with Leitishofen♯	458	916 ha
Rengetsweiler	Rengetsweiler	406	505 ha
Ringgenbach	Ringgenbach♯	203	499 ha
Wappen Rohrdorf	Rohrdorf	800	1611 ha

♯The Ringgenbach river flows through Dietershofen, then Ringgenbach, before its confluence into the Ablach east of Leitishofen

†Heudorf is a location on the Upper Swabian Baroque Route

‡Menningen-Leitishofen was formerly a stop on the extant Radolfzell–Mengen railway

== Notable residents ==
Meßkirch is the birthplace of composer Conradin Kreutzer, archbishop Conrad Gröber, writer and Georg Büchner Prize winner Arnold Stadler and, most famously, the philosopher Martin Heidegger. Also included are the well-known brewers Johann Nepomuk Schalk and his sons Herrmann and Oscar who began the Schalk Brewery in Newark, New Jersey, the first to bring lager beer to New Jersey. The town's name is also connected with a Renaissance painter whose provisional name is Master of Meßkirch. His Adoration of the Magi can be seen in the church of St. Martin. Katharina von Zimmern (1478-1547), the last abbess of the Fraumünster Abbey in Zürich, was born in Meßkirch.

== Culture ==
The Bodenseesender radio transmitter in the nearby village of Rohrdorf was turned off in February 2012.

== History ==
In 1800, the city was the site of a battle of the French Revolutionary Wars.

== Campus Galli ==
Campus Galli is a project to construct an authentic medieval town with a Carolingian monastery, that is located in woodlands near Meßkirch.
