= Hohenzollerische Landesbahn =

German railway company

Hohenzollerische Landesbahn AG
- Logo of the Hohenzollerischen Landesbahn
- Formerly: Actiengesellschaft Hohenzollern’sche Kleinbahngesellschaft
- Company type: company
- Industry: railways
- Founded: 1899 in Sigmaringen, Province of Hohenzollern, Prussia
- Headquarters: Bahnhofstraße 21, Hechingen, Germany
- Area served: Baden-Württemberg
- Services: Rail passenger and freight operations
- Revenue: €42.2 million (2012)
- Owner: State of Baden-Württemberg (72 %); Landkreis Sigmaringen (14 %); Zollernalbkreis (14 %)
- Number of employees: 276 (2012)
- Website: http://www.hzl-online.de/

The Hohenzollerische Landesbahn (HzL) was the largest non-federally owned railway company in the German state of Baden-Württemberg after the Albtal-Verkehrs-Gesellschaft and Südwestdeutsche Verkehrs-Aktiengesellschaft. It operated passenger and freight traffic since 1900. Its field of activity latterly extended to large parts of southern Baden-Württemberg.

The focus of its business in 2011, with revenue of €32.4 million (80%), is railway passenger operations, 11% (€4.3 million) of revenues come from road transport bus operations and revenue of €3.6 million (9%) is produced by rail freight operations.

The HzL was a member of the Tarifverband der Bundeseigenen und Nichtbundeseigenen Eisenbahnen in Deutschland ("fare association of federally-owned and non-federally owned railways in Germany", TBNE) and the Verband Deutscher Verkehrsunternehmen ("association of German transport companies").

On 1 January 2018, the HzL merged with the Südwestdeutsche Verkehrs-Aktiengesellschaft (SWEG); the new entity is called Südwestdeutsche Landesverkehrs-AG (SWEG).

== History ==
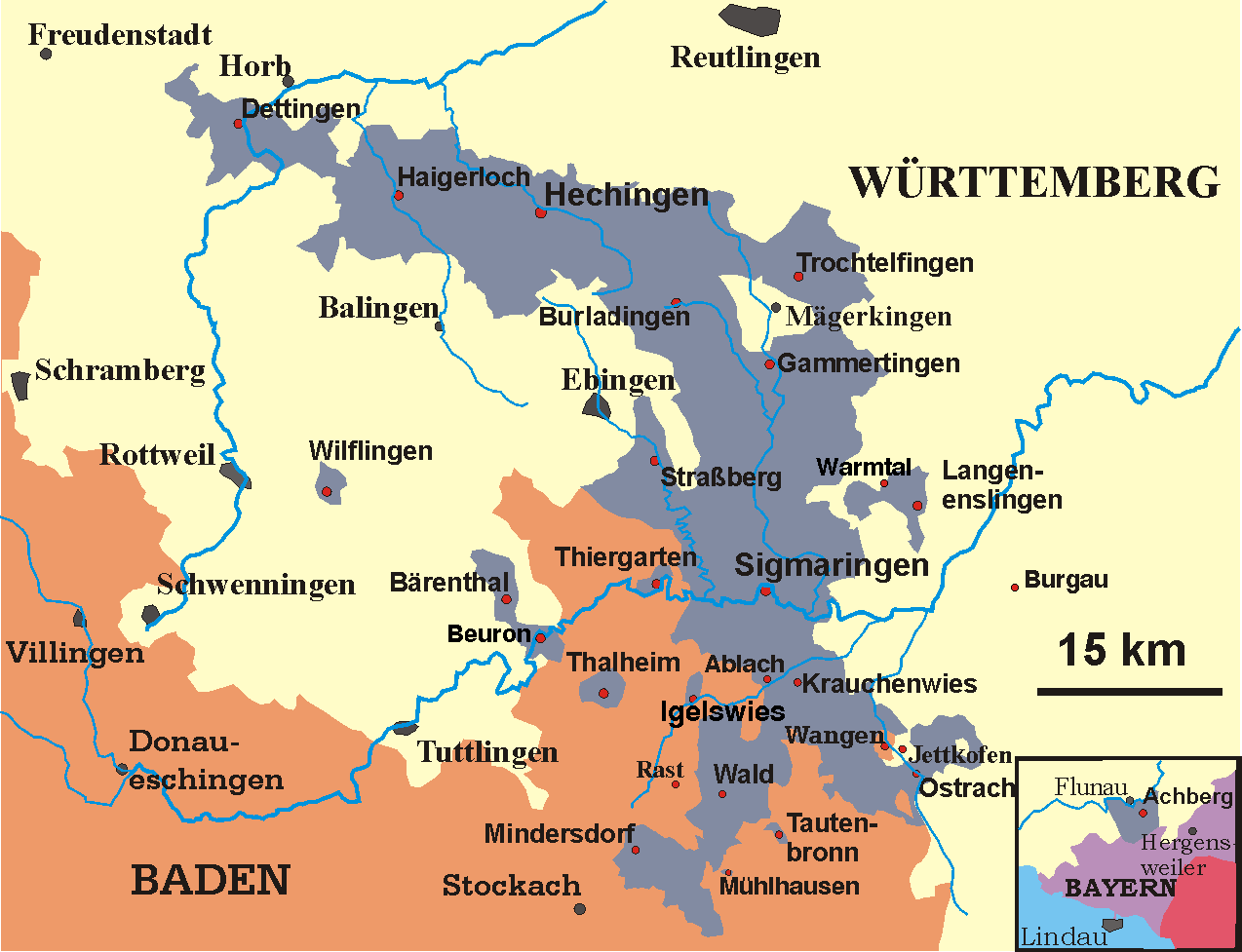
The Hohenzollern Lands

The HzL was founded in 1899 as the Actiengesellschaft Hohenzollern’sche Kleinbahngesellschaft (Hohenzollern light railway company) in order to build Kleinbahn (light railways as authorised by a Prussian law of 1892) in the Prussian region of Sigmaringen (part of the Province of Hohenzollern).

Since the Province of Hohenzollern was an elongated territory partly surrounded by the Kingdom of Württemberg, the Royal Württemberg State Railways's railway at this time only used the shortest route through this "foreign" area and only served the two district towns of Hechingen (from 1869) and Sigmaringen (from 1878).

As the founder of Hohenzollerischen Landesbahn, the government of Prussia took over 50 percent of the capital, and the Landeskommunalverband der Hohenzollerischen Lande (a collective local government body of the Province of Hohenzollern) and the Westdeutsche Eisenbahn-Gesellschaft (West German Railway Company) took about 25 percent each. Since 1972, the majority shareholder has been the state of Baden-Württemberg with 71.934%, while Zollernalbkreis and Sigmaringen district each have 14.033%. The HZL in turn holds 7.5% of the share capital of the Verkehrsverbund Neckar-Alb-Donau (Neckar-Alb-Donau transport association, naldo).

The HzL began to build branches from the lines of the Württemberg State Railways to develop the Prussian territory. The first was opened on 28 March 1900 in the Danube Valley, running upstream of Sigmaringendorf through the Lauchert valley to the Laucherthal goods yard at the Fürstlichen steelworks and continuing to Bingen. The following year the HzL brought three more branch lines into operation:

- on 18 March 1901 from Hechingen to Burladingen,
- on 7 June 1901 from Eyach via Haigerloch to Stetten and the Stetten salt mine and
- on 7 November 1901 branching off the Reutlingen–Schelklingen railway at Kleinengstingen and running to Gammertingen.

After a break of several years, during which the company was renamed Hohenzollerische Landesbahn AG on 18 June 1907, four lines were selected for extension as a connected network.

On 6 December 1908, the railway was extended from Burladingen to Gammertingen, which is still the location of the HzL's operating center with its main workshop, and it continued to the southeast via Hanfertal to Bingen, where it connected with the existing line to Sigmaringendorf on the Ulm–Sigmaringen railway.

On 5 October 1910, a shortcut was completed from Hanfertal to Sigmaringen state railway station. At Christmas 1912 (24 December) the last gap was closed between Stetten and Hechingen, providing a continuous line from Eyach via Hechingen–Gammertingen–Hanfertal to Sigmaringendorf with a length of 86 km. With the branches to Kleinengstingen (20 km) and to Sigmaringen (2 km), the HzL network comprised a total length of almost 107.4 km, including 15 km of lines in Württemberg.

It was managed by the operations branch, based in Stuttgart, of the Westdeutsche Eisenbahn-Gesellschaft (WeEG) of Cologne until 1928 and following the WeEG’s merger with Aktiengesellschaft für Verkehrswesen, it was managed by the Vereinigte Kleinbahnen. From 1 July 1933, the HzL has managed its operation itself. Its seat of administration is Hechingen.

On 24 July 2017, a merger between the HzL and Südwestdeutsche Verkehrs-Aktiengesellschaft (SWEG) was approved by the Sigmaringen and Zollernalbkreis district authorities which each hold 14% stakes in HzL. The merger has already been approved by the state of Baden-Württemberg, which owns 100% of SWEG and 72% of HzL. The merger tppk effect on 1 January 2018.

=== Development of HzL network ===
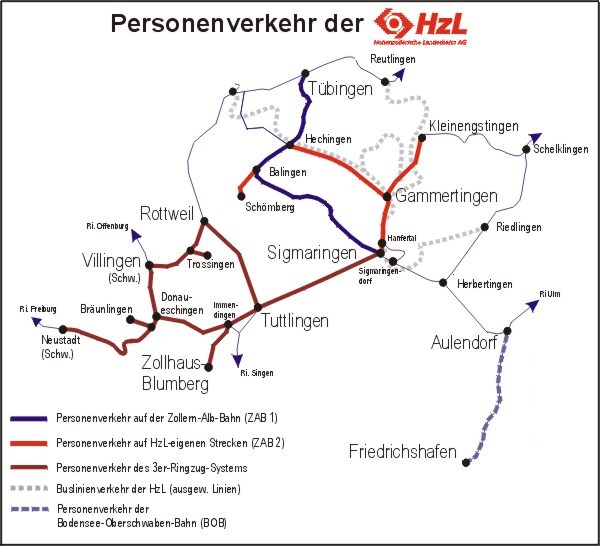
Route network of HzL passenger services plus the freight-only line to Eyach (HzL mainline network and links with non-HzL lines) plus selected bus services

The main line network of the HzL, which was completed almost a hundred years ago, is still in operation today. Passenger services are operated between Hechingen and Sigmaringen, continuing to Eyach on Saturdays, Sundays and public holidays. The rest of the network was converted to bus operations between 1968 and 1973 section by section:

- 29 September 1968: Sigmaringendorf–Bingen–Hanfertal (school trains continued until 30 May 1991)
- 1 June 1969: Kleinengstingen–Trochtelfingen
- 28 May 1972: Trochtelfingen–Gammertingen
- 1 October 1972: Eyach–Haigerloch
- 3 June 1973: Haigerloch–Hechingen

The HzL bus services launched in 1947 today cover an 800-km route network with hubs in Reutlingen, Horb, Sigmaringen and Riedlingen.

In 2000, the Gammertingen–Kleinengstingen railway was reactivated for excursion trips of the Rad-Wander-Shuttle, running from May to October, supporting cycling tourism.

The 107.5 km long main line of the HzL was extended in January 2001 by the leasing of the 12.9 km-long non-dismantled section of the DB-owned Balingen–Rottweil railway between Balingen and Schomberg. This line is used by HzL freight traffic and is also served by the Rad-Wander-Shuttle during the summer. In addition, the HzL operates on behalf of the Ringzug the 2.8 km-long Bräunlingen–Hüfingen section of the Breg Valley Railway, which was originally owned by the Südwestdeutsche Verkehrs-Aktiengesellschaft.

== The main lines of the HzL ==
The Hohenzollerische Landesbahn owns the following lines:

Line no. (DB)	Name	Length	Current operations
9460	Eyach–Hechingen railway	27.9 km	Leisure traffic, freight traffic
9461	Engstingen–Sigmaringen railway	42.9 km	Passenger traffic, freight traffic
9462	Sigmaringendorf–Hanfertal railway	9.7 km	Freight traffic
9466	Hechingen–Gammertingen railway	27.0 km	Passenger traffic, freight traffic

=== Expansion on the lines of other railways ===
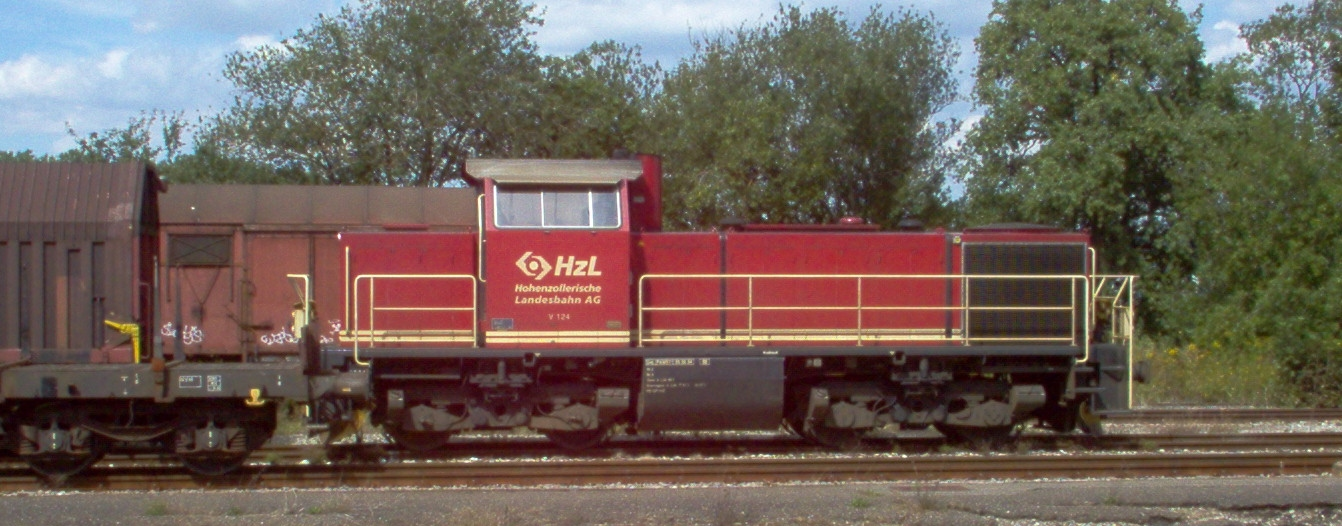
Goods locomotive V 124 of the HzL

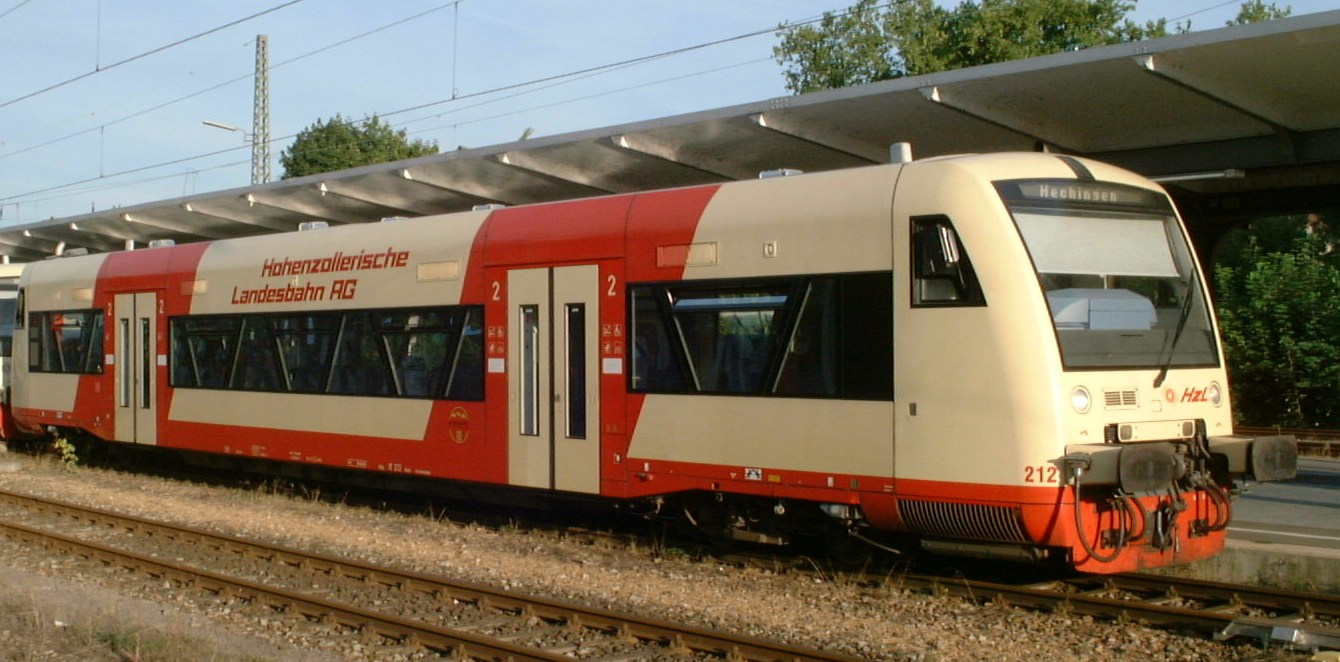
Regio-Shuttle of the HzL in Tübingen in 1997

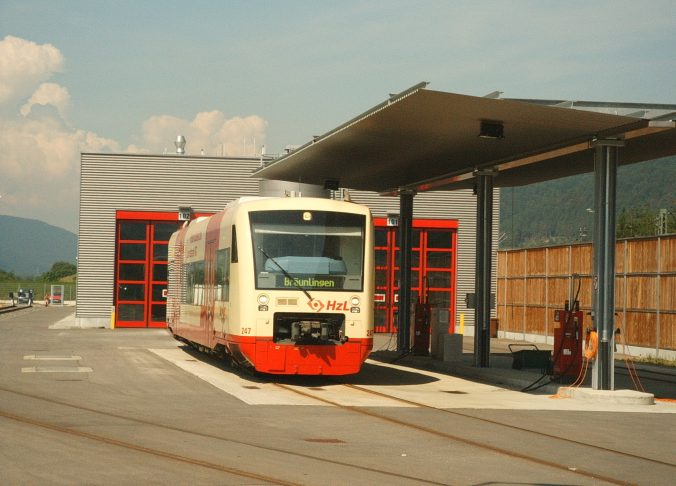
HzL railway workshop built for the Ringzug in Immendingen in 2003 with Regio-Shuttle, built in 2003

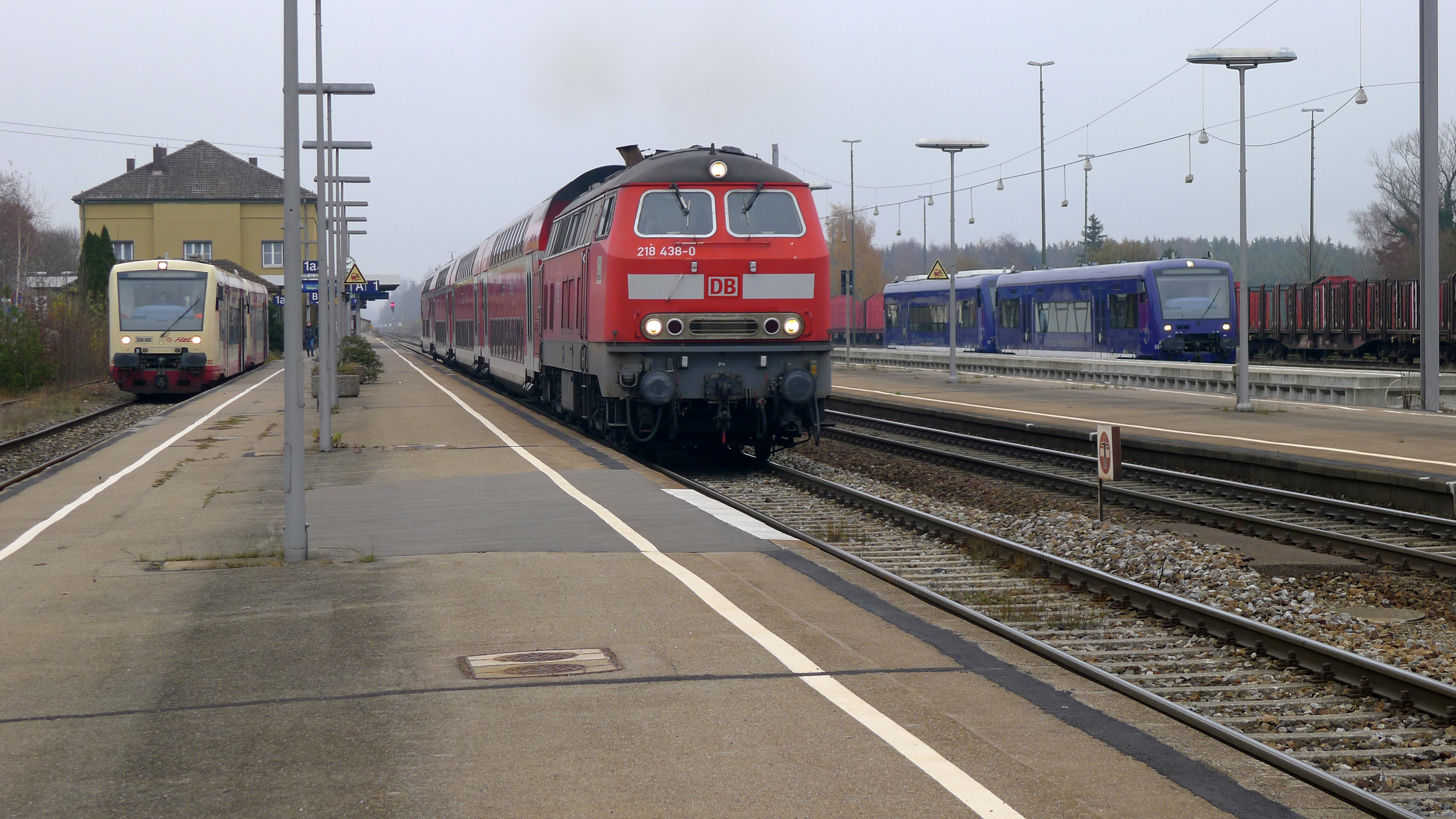
Aulendorf station in 2011 with trains of three different companies

Over the past 20 years, the field of activity of the Hohenzollerischen Landesbahn has significantly expanded.

In freight operations, since 1990, the HzL has taken over the hauling of salt block trains from Stetten (b Haigerloch) on DB lines to Ulm. The HzL also hauls freight on flat wagon between Tübingen, Sigmaringen, Bad Saulgau and Schelklingen in cooperation with Deutsche Bahn (DB Cargo).

Its passenger operations now operate over a route network of more than 400 kilometres. From 1993, the HzL took over the operation of the Bodensee-Oberschwaben-Bahn, which now runs between Aulendorf and Friedrichshafen Hafen. With the electrification of the Ulm–Friedrichshafen railway, this service has been operated by DB Regio since December 2021. In 1997, the HzL received a contract from the State of Baden-Württemberg for the operation of Regionalbahn services on the Tübingen–Sigmaringen railway, Ulm–Sigmaringen railway and Herbertingen–Aulendorf railway, forming the Zollernalb Railway between Tübingen and Aulendorf.

Since September 2003, it has operated the Ringzug in the Schwarzwald-Baar-Heuberg region; this is an S-Bahn-like transport system connecting Blumberg, Tuttlingen, Rottweil, Villingen-Schwenningen and Donaueschingen, for which the Verkehrsbetrieb Ringzug branch was built with its own management and depot. The most recent expansion took place on Lake Constance: in December 2006, it over operations under a new contract of the 17 kilometre-long route of the Seehäsle service over the Stockach–Radolfzell line from SBB GmbH, the German subsidiary of the Swiss Federal Railways.

Its passenger services contracts are as follows (as of 2022):

Network	Line	Route	Rolling stock	Contract term
Seehäsle	RB 32	Radolfzell – Stockach	Regio-Shuttle 1	Dec. 2006 – Dec. 2023
15 Biberbahn (leisure traffic)	RB 32a	Stockach – Sauldorf – Meßkirch – Menningen-Leitishofen – Mengen	Regio-Shuttle 1	
15 Schwarzwälder Ring	RB 42	Bräunlingen – Donaueschingen – Villingen (Schwarzw) – Schwenningen (Neckar) – Trossingen Bf (– Trossingen Stadt) – Rottweil	Regio-Shuttle 1	Expected until Dec. 2027
15 Schwarzwälder Ring	RB 43	Rottweil – Tuttlingen – Immendingen – Blumberg-Zollhaus	Regio-Shuttle 1	Expected until Dec. 2027
12 Ulmer Stern	RB 56	Munderkingen – Ehingen (Donau) – Schelklingen – Ulm Hbf	Coradia LINT 54	Jun. 2019 – Dec. 2032
12 Ulmer Stern	RB 57	Ulm Hbf – Langenau (Württ.) – Giengen (Brenz) – Heidenheim – Aalen Hbf	Coradia LINT 54	Jun. 2019 – Dec. 2032
14a Zollernbahn ZAB 1	RB 66	Tübingen Hbf – Hechingen – Balingen (Württ) – Albstadt-Ebingen – Sigmaringen	Coradia LINT 54	Dec. 2013 – Dec. 2025
14a Zollernbahn (leisure traffic)	RB 67	Eyach – Haigerloch – Hechingen LB	Coradia LINT 54	
14b Zollernbahn ZAB 2	RB 68	Hechingen – Gammertingen – Sigmaringen	Coradia LINT 54	Dec. 2016 – Dec. 2025
14a Zollernbahn (leisure traffic)	RB 69	Balingen (Württ.) – Schömberg (b. Balingen)	Coradia LINT 54	

The HzL also hauls passenger trains for Deutsche Bahn (DB Regio) on the Rottweil–Horb and Tübingen–Herrenberg routes. The railcars and locomotives the HzL are regularly hired out for special trains and work trains throughout Baden-Württemberg and Switzerland.
