= Sigmaringendorf–Hanfertal railway =

Railway line in Germany

Overview
- Line number: 9462
- Locale: Baden-Württemberg, Germany

Technical
- Line length: 9.7 km (6.0 mi)
- Track gauge: 1,435 mm (4 ft 8 1/2 in) standard gauge

The Sigmaringendorf–Hanfertal railway is a branch line in Baden-Württemberg, Germany. It is owned by the owned by the Hohenzollerische Landesbahn (HzL). It runs from Sigmaringendorf via Bingen to Hanfertal (a village in Sigmaringen) and is single track and non-electrified throughout. It is currently used only for freight. The line is also known as the Laucherttalbahn ("Lauchert Valley Railway").

== History ==
Since the Prussian Province of Hohenzollern (Hohenzollern Lands) was an elongated territory partly surrounded by the Kingdom of Württemberg, the line of the Royal Württemberg State Railways (Königlich Württembergischen Staats-Eisenbahnen) at this time only used the shortest route through this "foreign" area and only served the two district towns of Hechingen (from 1869) and Sigmaringen (from 1878). The HzL as the Actiengesellschaft Hohenzollern’sche Kleinbahngesellschaft (Hohenzollern light railway company), now the Hohenzollerische Landesbahn, was founded in 1899 to build Kleinbahnen (light railways as authorised by a Prussian law of 1892) in the Hohenzollern Lands.

On 28 March 1900, the six-kilometre-long section between Sigmaringendorf and Bingen was opened as the first line of the HzL. The line ran from the Danube valley near Sigmaringendorf in the Lauchert valley northwards to the Fürstlichen Steelworks with the Laucherthal freight yard and on to Bingen. On 6 December 1908, the branch line was extended to Hanfertal and connected to the Kleinengstingen–Hanfertal line. For the first time trains ran between Hechingen, Kleinengstingen and Sigmaringendorf and connected with other lines in these places.

Less than two years later, the line lost importance when the shortcut from Hanfertal to Sigmaringen Landesbahn station was completed on 5 October 1910.

== Operations ==
In the course of the nationwide closure of branch lines, the HzL also switched passenger transport to bus service on some routes between 1968 and 1973. From 29 September 1968, the Sigmaringendorf–Hanfertal line was only served by school transport until this, too, was discontinued on 30 May 1991.

The line is now only used for freight traffic.
