= Eyach–Hechingen railway =

Railway line in Germany

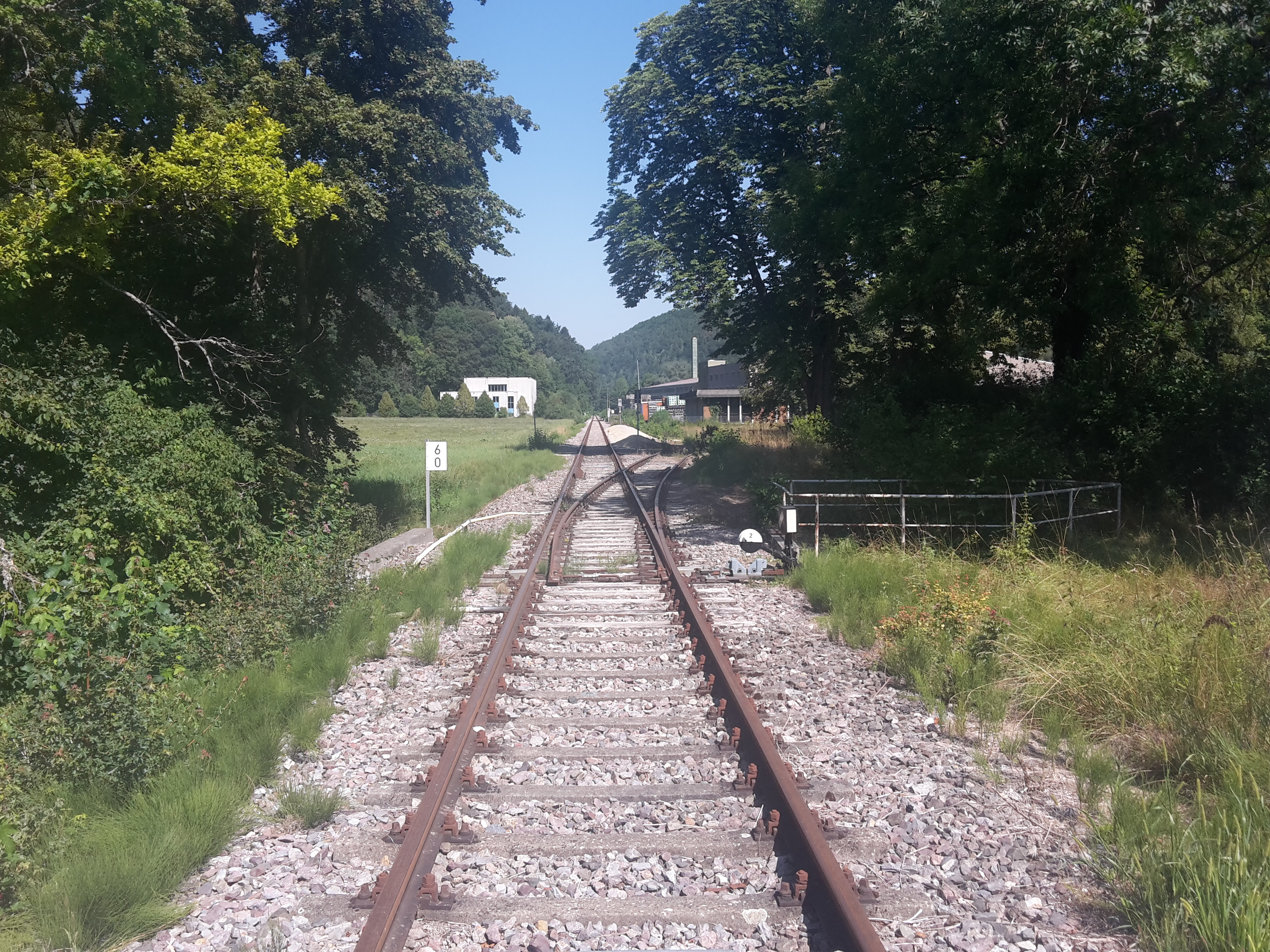
- Bad Imnau station

Overview
- Line number: 9460
- Locale: Baden-Württemberg, Germany

Service
- Route number: 767

Technical
- Line length: 27.9 km (17.3 mi)
- Track gauge: 1,435 mm (4 ft 8 1/2 in) standard gauge
- Operating speed: 60 km/h (37 mph)

The Eyach–Hechingen railway is a branch line in Baden-Württemberg, Germany. It is owned by the Hohenzollerische Landesbahn (HzL). It runs from Eyach (near Eutingen) via Haigerloch to Hechingen. It is single track throughout and is not electrified.

The route is also known as the Eyachtalbahn (Eyach Valley Railway) or Zollern-Alb-Bahn 4 (ZAB 4; Zollernalb Railway 4).

== History ==
Since the Prussian Province of Hohenzollern (Hohenzollern Lands) was an elongated territory partly surrounded by the Kingdom of Württemberg, the line of the Royal Württemberg State Railways (Königlich Württembergischen Staats-Eisenbahnen) at this time only used the shortest route through this "foreign" area and only served the two district towns of Hechingen (from 1869) and Sigmaringen (from 1878). The HzL as the Actiengesellschaft Hohenzollern’sche Kleinbahngesellschaft (Hohenzollern light railway company), now the Hohenzollerische Landesbahn, was founded in 1899 to build Kleinbahnen (light railways as authorised by a Prussian law of 1892) in the Hohenzollern Lands.

The branch line from Eyach via Haigerloch to Stetten (bei Haigerloch), the location of the Stetten salt mine, was put into operation as the third line of the Hohenzollerische Landesbahn on 7 June 1901. It was not until 1912 that the gap between Stetten and Hechingen was closed as the last main line built by the HzL. This created a continuous rail connection 86 kilometres-long across the Hohenzollernsche Land from Eyach via Hechingen, Gammertingen and Hanfertal to Sigmaringendorf.

Since the Royal Württemberg State Railways owned the Plochingen–Immendingen railway and the Tübingen–Sigmaringen railway, the Hohenzollerische Landesbahn was initially denied access to the existing lines. In Eyach and Hechingen, for example, separate stations were built next to the existing stations, as well as on the other main lines of the HzL in Sigmaringen or Kleinengstingen.

=== Operation and end of passenger services ===
Initially, steam locomotives from the Hohenzollern Locomotive Works were used on the line. As early as 1934, the HzL procured the VT 1 and VT2 diesel multiple units and was able to significantly reduce the travel time between Eyach and Sigmaringen. In 1936, the VT 3 set was followed by another railcar, which had to be scrapped in 1968 after a head-on collision near Hart (near Haigerloch), in which the driver died.

In the course of the nationwide closure of branch lines, the Hohenzollerische Landesbahn also switched passenger transport to bus service on some routes between 1968 and 1973. In 1972, passenger services were discontinued on the Eyach–Haigerloch section and eight months later on the Haigerloch–Hechingen section.

== Current freight and leisure traffic ==
To this day, freight trains run on the line several times a week, mainly traffic from the Stetten salt mine and timber traffic.

In the autumn of 2008, after 30 years, local passenger services with excursion trains was revived with the classic HzL trains. In 2009, leisure traffic was added as the 3-Löwen-Takt Radexpress Eyachtäler and renamed Zug der Zeit in 2016. Since 2012, it has been running on all Sundays and public holidays from 1 May to mid-October. A railcar runs every two hours between Eyach and Hechingen. A historic MAN railbus was mainly used until 2011. After the vehicles had become worn out and were subsequently sold, they were replaced by Regio-Shuttle. LINT 54 sets have been operated since the 2020 timetable change.

There are additional trips every year for the Haigerloch Christmas market.
