= Engstingen–Sigmaringen railway =

Railway line in Germany

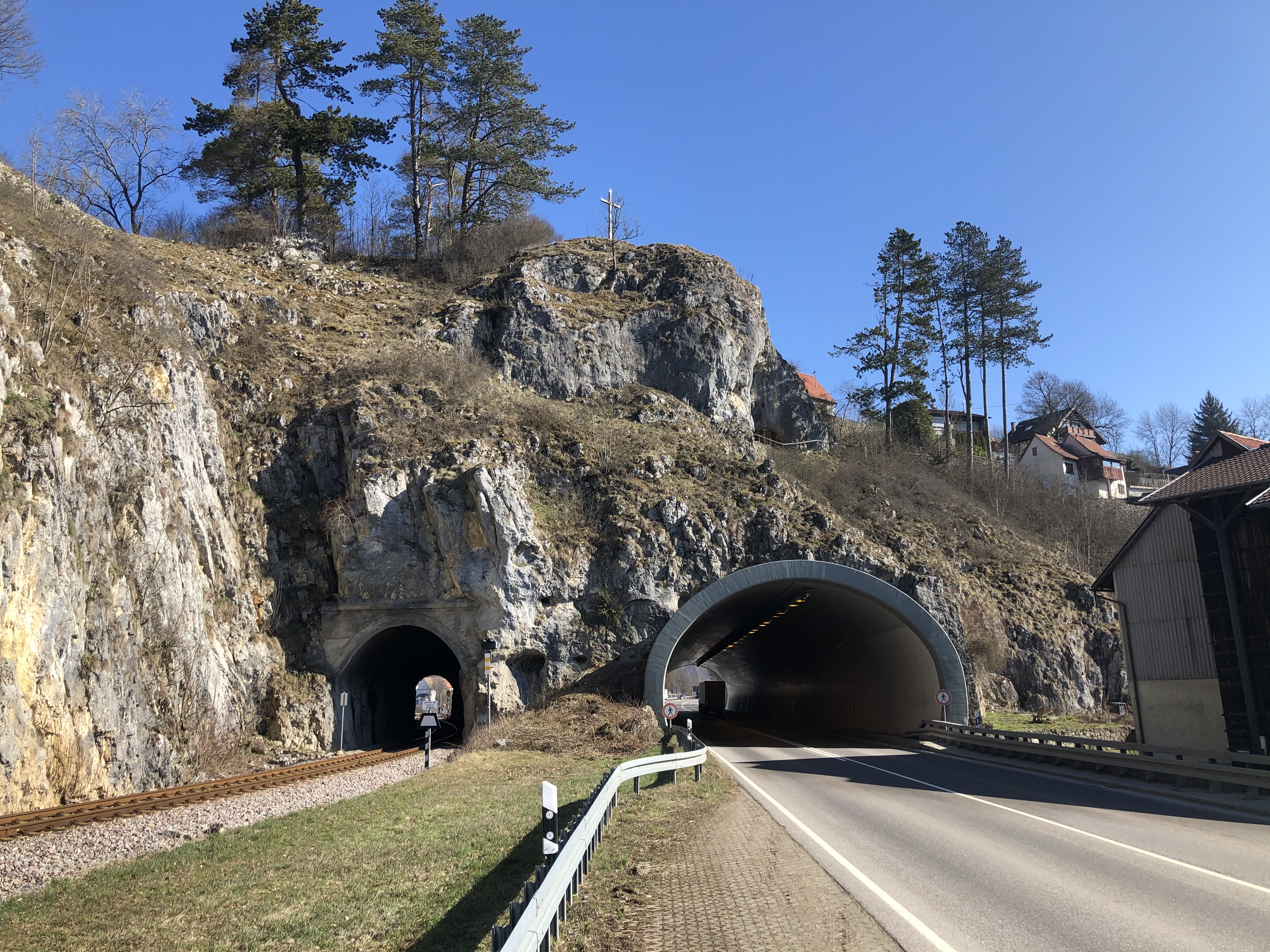
- Tunnel near Veringenstadt running parallel to the tunnel of the Bundesstraße 32

Overview
- Line number: 9461
- Locale: Baden-Württemberg, Germany

Service
- Route number: 759 (Engstingen–Gammertingen); 768 (Gammertingen–Sigmaringen)

Technical
- Line length: 42.9 km (26.7 mi)
- Track gauge: 1,435 mm (4 ft 8 1/2 in) standard gauge
- Operating speed: 80 km/h (50 mph)

The Engstingen–Sigmaringen railway is a branch line in Baden-Württemberg, Germany. It is owned by the owned by the Hohenzollerische Landesbahn (HzL). It runs from Engstingen (formerly Kleinengstingen) via Gammertingen to Sigmaringen and is single track and non-electrified throughout.

== History ==
Since the Prussian Province of Hohenzollern (Hohenzollern Lands) was an elongated territory partly surrounded by the Kingdom of Württemberg, the line of the Royal Württemberg State Railways (Königlich Württembergischen Staats-Eisenbahnen) at this time only used the shortest route through this "foreign" area and only served the two district towns of Hechingen (from 1869) and Sigmaringen (from 1878). The HzL as the Actiengesellschaft Hohenzollern’sche Kleinbahngesellschaft (Hohenzollern light railway company), now the Hohenzollerische Landesbahn, was founded in 1899 to build Kleinbahnen (light railways as authorised by a Prussian law of 1892) in the Hohenzollern Lands.

Kleinengstingen had been connected to the Württemberg railway network by the Reutlingen–Schelklingen railway since 1893. On 7 November 1901, the HzL station was opened next to the station of the Württemberg State Railways and the line to Gammertingen were put into operation as the fourth HzL line. Seven years later, on 6 December 1908, the second half of the line between Gammertingen and Hanfertal was completed and a connection to the Ulm–Sigmaringen railway was achieved via the Sigmaringendorf–Hanfertal railway. A short cut was built when the line was extended to Sigmaringen in 1910, providing a connection to the Tübingen–Sigmaringen railway.

=== Passenger services on the Engstingen–Gammertingen section ===
In the course of the nationwide closure of branch lines, the HzL also switched passenger transport to bus service on some routes between 1968 and 1973. In 1969, passenger services were discontinued on the Kleinengstingen–Trochtelfingen section and in 1972 on the Trochtelfingen–Gammertingen section. From then on, the line was only used for freight traffic and tourist trips.

From 2000, regular excursions were again offered with the Rad-Wander-Shuttle ("bike-hiking shuttle") on Sundays and public holidays between May and October. A new station was built in 2006 for excursions to the ALB-GOLD pasta factory.

After extensive renovation and upgrading work, passenger traffic between Engstingen and Gammertingen was resumed when the timetable changed in December 2019. The Schwäbische Alb-Bahn extended its Ulm–Schelklingen–Engstingen passenger service to Gammertingen in June 2019. In addition to upgrading the platforms, signalling systems and level crossings, the new Engstingen Schulzentrum station was built.

Only four months after the resumption of passenger traffic, operations had to be stopped again in April 2020 because increased signs of wear were found on the wheel sets of the multiple unit. Neither the total renewal of individual sections nor the installation of longer tracks on very narrow track curves reduced wear. For months, only individual journeys and rail replacement bus services operated. Finally, the Engstingen–Haidkapelle section was identified as the cause and repaired accordingly. Services returned to the normal timetable in November 2020.

== Operations ==
Line	Route	Lines	Operator
RB 59	Gammertingen – Engstingen – Münsingen – Schelklingen – Ulm	Engstingen–Sigmaringen railway, Reutlingen–Schelklingen railway, Ulm–Sigmaringen railway	SAB Schwäbische Alb-Bahn GmbH
RB 68	Hechingen – Gammertingen – Sigmaringen	Hechingen–Gammertingen railway, Engstingen–Sigmaringen railway	SWEG Südwestdeutsche Landesverkehrs-AG

Local rail passenger transport is contracted by the state of Baden-Württemberg. In the 2016 contract awards, the HzL was once again able to win the contract for network 14b (Zollern-Alb-Bahn 2). The current transport contract with SWEG, which has been the legal successor to the HzL since the 2018 merger, runs until 2025.

Diesel multiple units of class NE81 of the Schwäbischen Alb-Bahn have been operating on the Engstingen–Gammertingen section since the resumption of passenger services. Although the NE81s acquired from 2013 to 2016 were repainted in the red-cream-silver-black colour scheme of the Schwäbische Alb-Bahn, additional vehicles acquired by SWEG in 2021 are running in their original red-beige HzL livery. The railcars can also pull freight wagons.

Until the timetable change in 2020, Regio-Shuttle 1 diesel multiple units in the red-beige livery of the HzL operated on the Gammertingen–Sigmaringen section. Now Lint 54 in the Baden-Württemberg state livery are used for passenger services.

In addition to regular passenger services, freight and excursion services are operated on the line.
