= Waldbühne (disambiguation) =

The Waldbühne is an open-air theatre in Berlin, but the term, which means "forest stage" or "woodland theatre" in German, may also refer to:

- Waldbühne Bischofswerda, the location of the Karl-May-Spiele Bischofswerda
- Brüder Grimm Waldbühne, see Bremke
- Waldbühne Hamm-Heessen, see Hamm#Culture
- Waldbühne Schwarzenberg, see Rockelmann#Nazi arena
- Waldbühne Sigmaringendorf
