= Old Prussia (disambiguation) =

Old Prussia may refer to different entities, which were also territorially defined.

In political and territorial respect it refers to:

- Old Prussia
- The Provinces of Prussia officially formed in 1815 or partially later, whose territories belonged to the Kingdom of Prussia before 1815 or before 1866, especially:
  - in a narrow sense the expression means the entirety of the:
    - Province of Brandenburg
    - Province of East Prussia
    - Province of Pomerania
    - Province of Prussia, combining East and West Prussia between 1829 and 1878
    - Province of Silesia
    - Province of West Prussia
  - in the broad sense of the expression the following provinces are also included:
    - Province of Hohenzollern
    - Rhine Province
    - Province of Westphalia

In religious and territorial respect it refers to:

- Evangelical State Church of Prussia's older Provinces, renamed into Evangelical Church of the old-Prussian Union (1922–1953).

Source: Der Große Brockhaus: Handbuch des Wissens in zwanzig Bänden: 21 vols., 15th totally revised ed., Leipzig: F. A. Brockhaus, 1928–1935, vol. 1: A–Ast, article: 'Altpreußen', p. 356. No ISBN.
