= Hechingen–Gammertingen railway =

Railway line in Germany

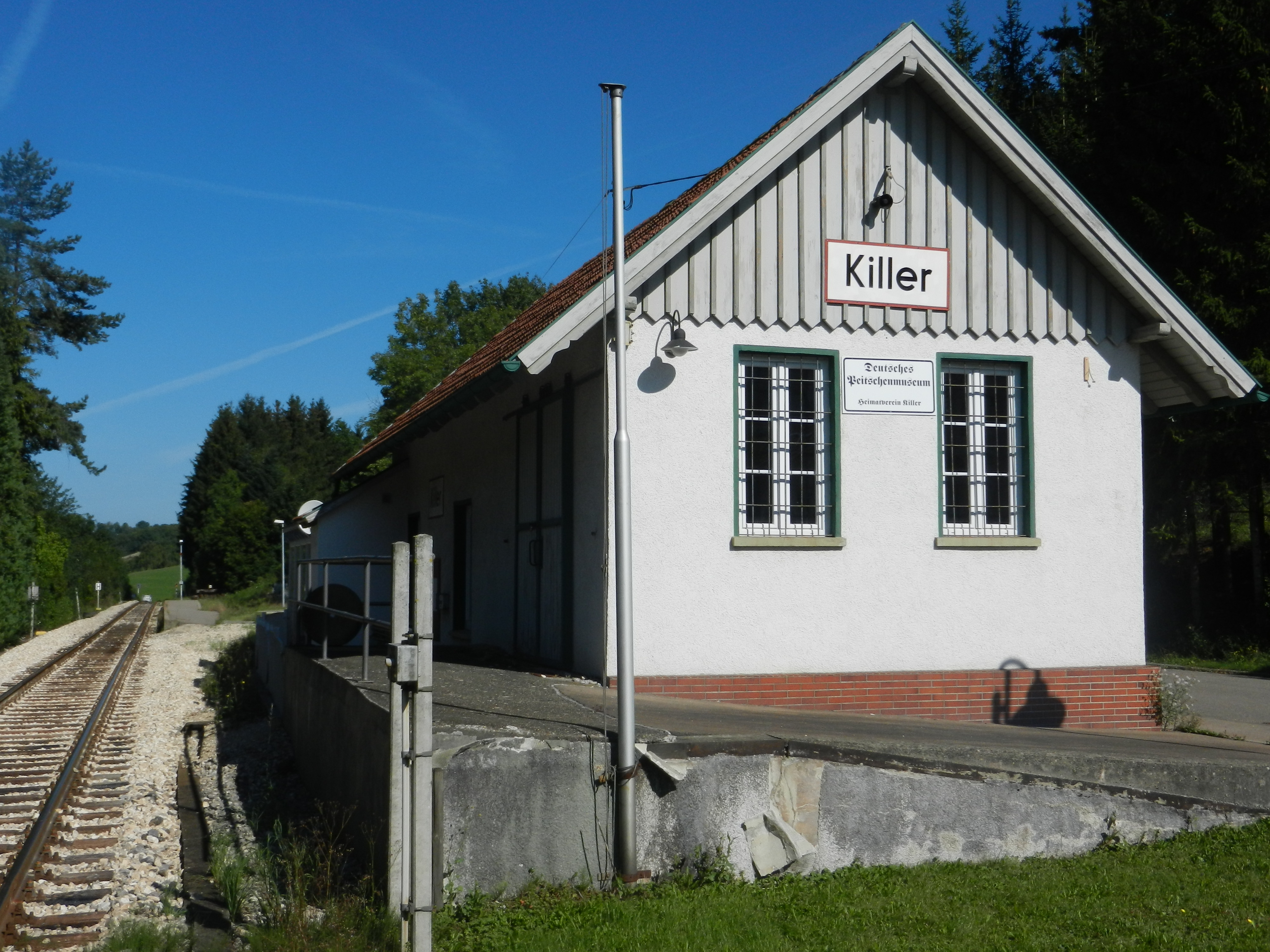
- The station building in Killer now houses the German Whip Museum

Overview
- Line number: 9466
- Locale: Baden-Württemberg, Germany

Service
- Route number: 768

Technical
- Line length: 27.0 km (16.8 mi)
- Track gauge: 1,435 mm (4 ft 8 1/2 in) standard gauge
- Operating speed: 80 km/h (50 mph)

The Hechingen–Gammertingen railway is a branch line in Baden-Württemberg, Germany. It is owned by the owned by the Hohenzollerische Landesbahn (HzL). It runs from Hechingen via Burladingen to Gammertingen and is single track and non-electrified throughout.

The route is also known as the Hohenzollernbahn (Hohenzollern Railway) or Zollern-Alb-Bahn 2 (ZAB 2), and the Hechingen–Burladingen section is also known as the Killertalbahn (Killer Valley Railway).

== History ==
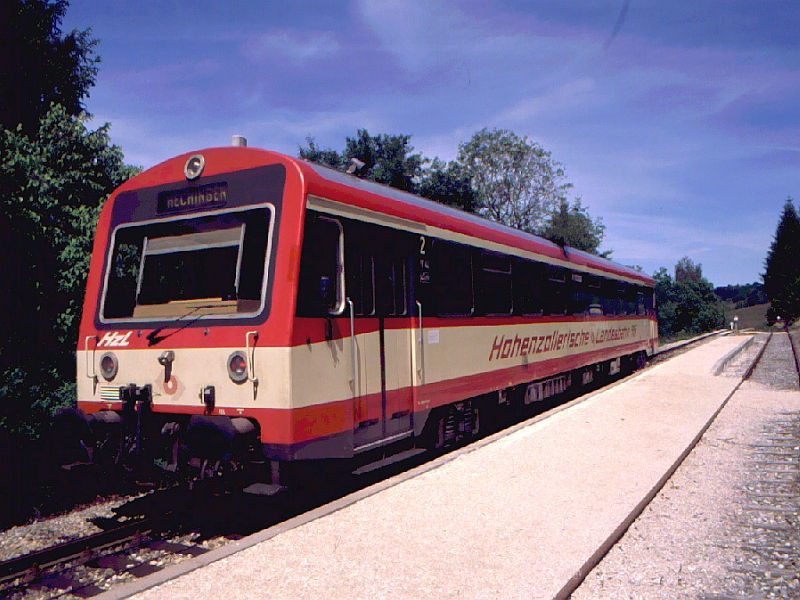
NE 81 railcar of the HzL in Killer station (2000)

Since the Prussian Province of Hohenzollern (Hohenzollern Lands) was an elongated territory partly surrounded by the Kingdom of Württemberg, the line of the Royal Württemberg State Railways (Königlich Württembergischen Staats-Eisenbahnen) at this time only used the shortest route through this "foreign" area and only served the two district towns of Hechingen (from 1869) and Sigmaringen (from 1878). The HzL as the Actiengesellschaft Hohenzollern’sche Kleinbahngesellschaft (Hohenzollern light railway company), now the Hohenzollerische Landesbahn, was founded in 1899 to build Kleinbahnen (light railways as authorised by a Prussian law of 1892) in the Hohenzollern Lands. On 18 March 1901 the Hechingen–Burladingen section was opened as the second HzL line. The 13.6–kilometre line was not connected to any other railway line and was a so-called "island operation". It was only in 1908 that the Burladingen–Gammertingen section was connected to the Engstingen–Gammertingen railway, which also belonged to the HzL. As a result, the gap between Gammertingen and the existing Sigmaringendorf–Hanfertal railway was closed, providing a connection to the Ulm–Sigmaringen railway.

== Operations ==
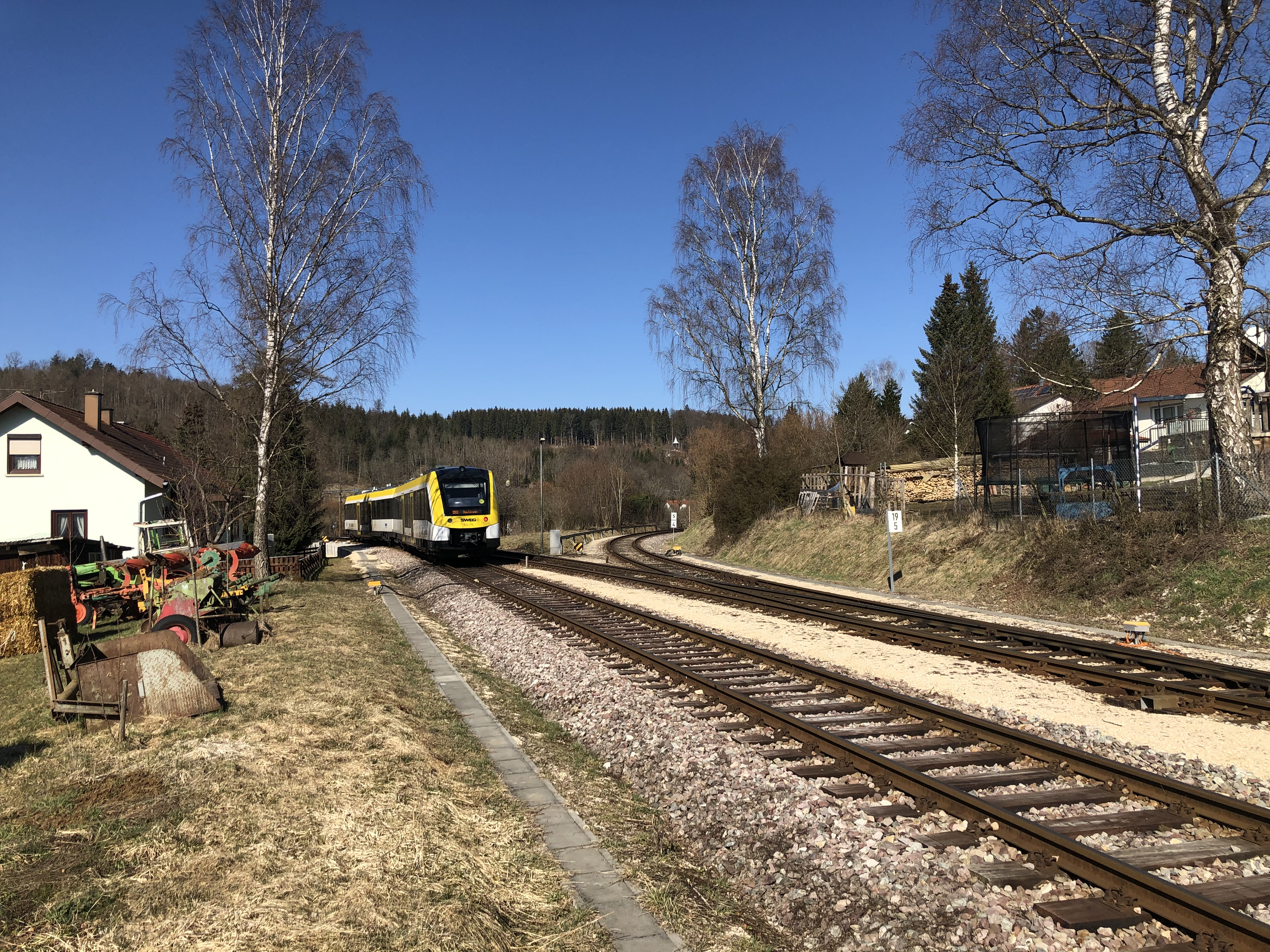
A SWEG regional train switches immediately north of Gammertinger station from the Sigmaringen–Engstingen line to the left onto the line towards Hechingen

The RB 68 service runs hourly from Hechingen via Gammertingen to Sigmaringen, although not all services serve the entire line and continue from Gammertingen to Sigmaringen. The Schlatt, Killer, Burladingen West and Gammertingen Europastraße stations have been established as request stops.

Local rail passenger transport is contracted by the state of Baden-Württemberg. In the 2016 contract awards, the HzL was once again able to win the contract for network 14b (Zollern-Alb-Bahn 2). The current transport contract with SWEG, which has been the legal successor to the Hohenzollerische Landesbahn since the 2018 merger, runs until 2025.

Until the timetable change in 2020, Regio-Shuttle 1 diesel multiple units in the red-beige livery of the Hohenzollerische Landesbahn operated on the line. Now Lint 54 sets in the Baden-Württemberg state livery are used for passenger services.
