= Lauchert =

River in Germany

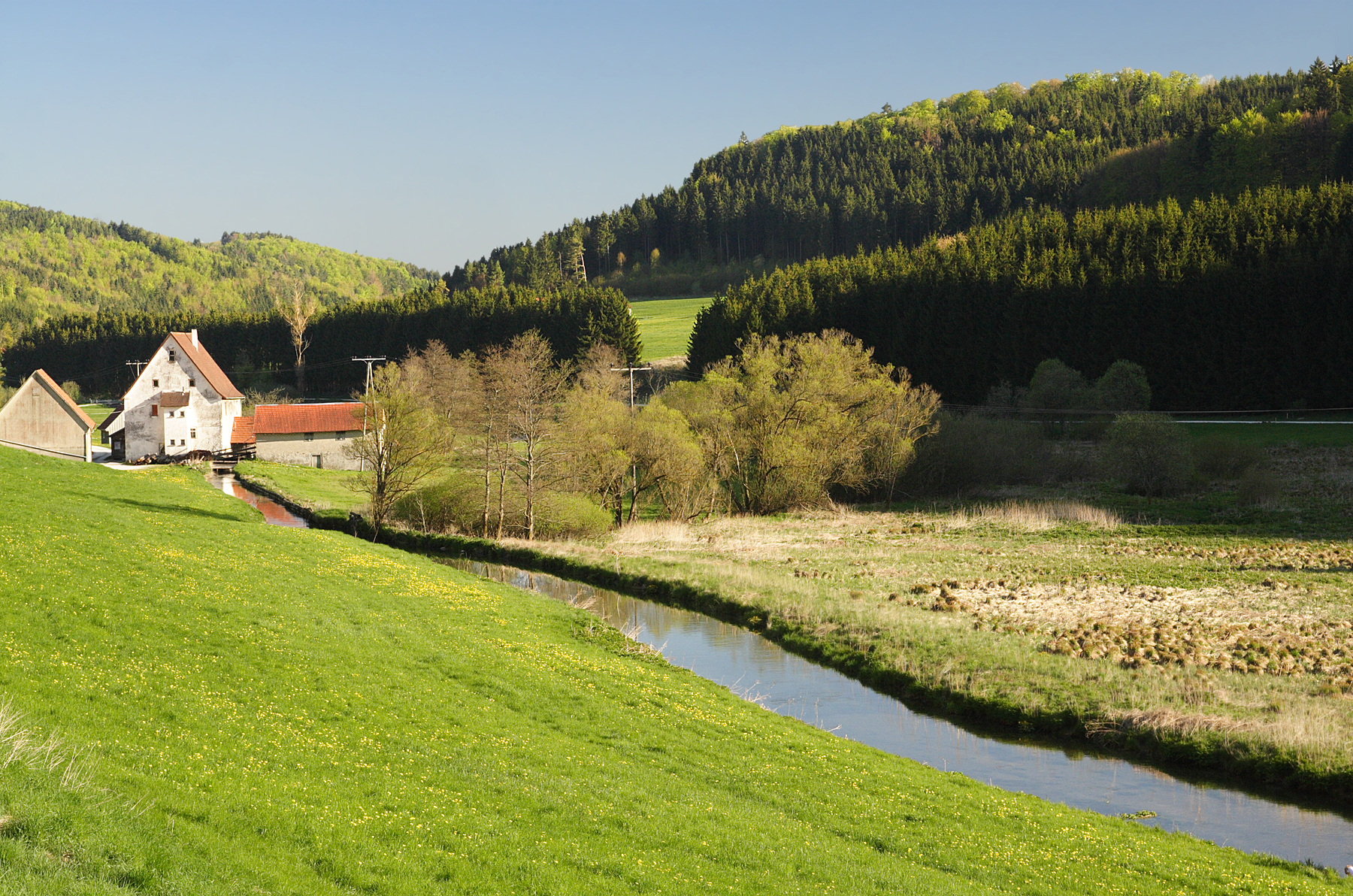

Location
- Country: Germany

Physical characteristics
- Source
  - location: Swabian Alb
- Mouth
  - location: Danube
  - coordinates: 48°3′46″N 9°15′49″E
- Length: 60.4 km (37.5 mi)
- Basin size: 456 km^{2} (176 sq mi)

Basin features
- Progression: Danube→ Black Sea

The Lauchert (German pronunciation: [ˈlaʊxɐt]) is a river in Baden-Württemberg, Germany, left tributary of the Danube. Its source is near Sonnenbühl, in the Swabian Alb. It is approx. 60 km long. It flows generally south through the small towns Gammertingen, Veringenstadt and Bingen. It flows into the Danube in Sigmaringendorf.
