= Waldbühne Sigmaringendorf =

Open-air theatre in Bade-Württemberg, Germany

Coordinates: 48°03′42″N 9°15′44″E

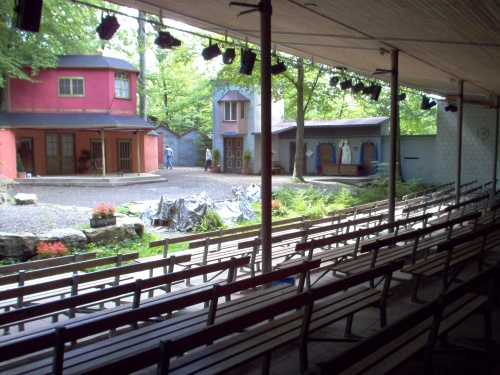
Waldbühne Sigmaringendorf in 2006

Waldbühne Sigmaringendorf is an Open-Air-theatre in Sigmaringendorf, Baden-Württemberg, Germany. The theatre was founded in 1928. The actors are amateurs and play two plays each season, one for children, one for adults. The first play in 1928 was Gerhart Hauptmann's ‘Der arme Heinrich’, in 2011 Waldbühne Sigmaringendorf showed Victor Hugo's Les Misérables and Astrid Lindgren's Pippi Longstocking.
