= Karl-May-Spiele Bischofswerda =

Karl-May-Spiele Bischofswerda is a theatre festival in Germany.
