= Engstingen =

- Municipality
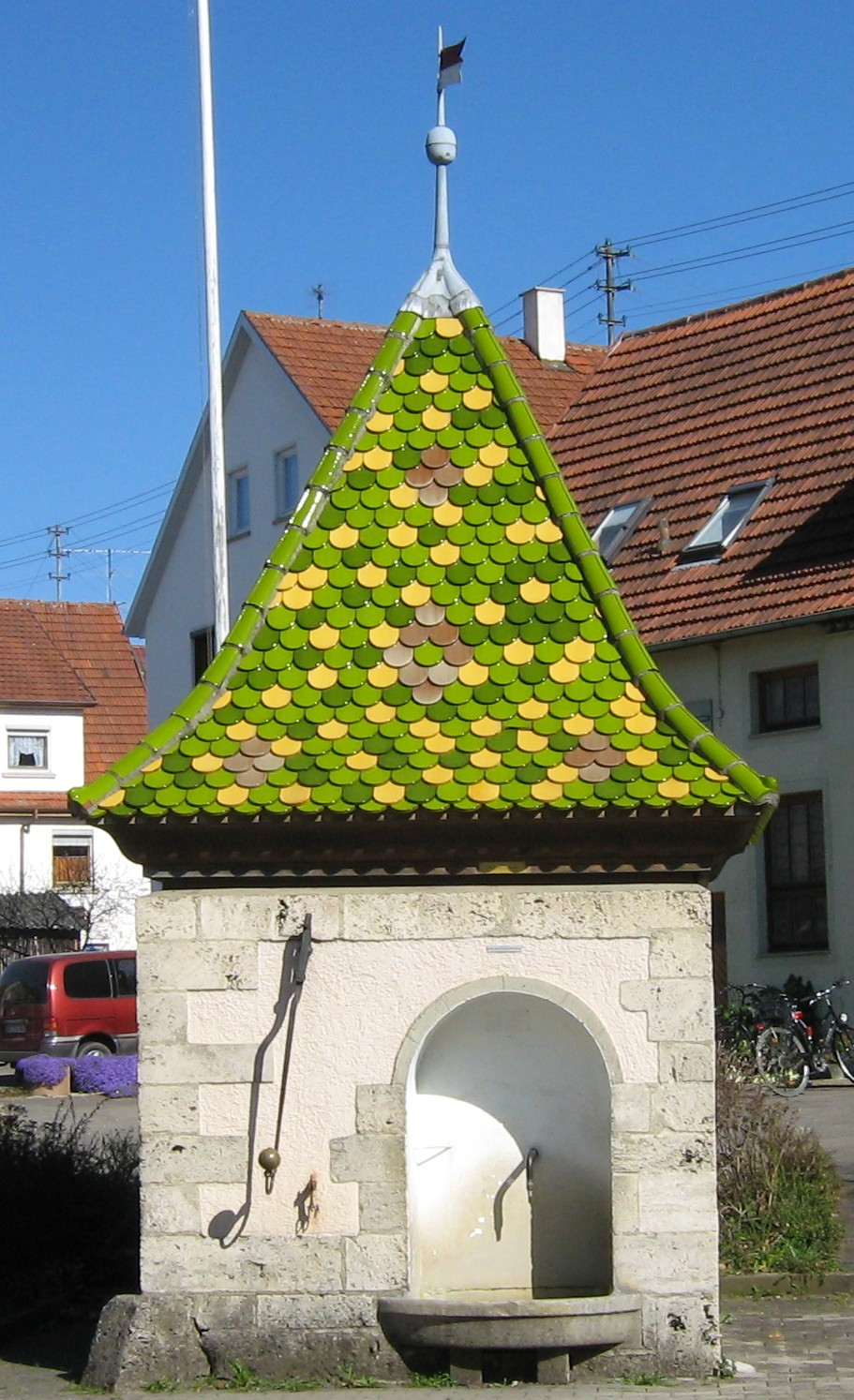
- Acidic well (Sauerbrunnen) in Kleinengstingen

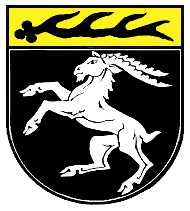
- Coat of arms

- Location of Engstingen within Reutlingen district
- Interactive map of Engstingen
- Location within Germany Location within Baden-Württemberg
- Coordinates: 48°23′13″N 09°17′08″E
- Country: Germany
- State: Baden-Württemberg
- Admin. region: Tübingen
- District: Reutlingen
- Subdivisions: 4 Ortsteile

Government
  - Mayor (2021–29): Mario Storz (CDU)

Area
  - Total: 31.51 km^{2} (12.17 sq mi)
- Elevation: 700 m (2,300 ft)

Population (2025-12-31)
  - Total: 4,976
  - Density: 157.9/km^{2} (409.0/sq mi)
- Time zone: UTC+01:00 (CET)
  - Summer (DST): UTC+02:00 (CEST)
- Postal codes: 72829
- Dialling codes: 07129, 07385
- Vehicle registration: RT
- Website: www.engstingen.de

Engstingen is a municipality in the Tübingen administrative region (Regierungsbezirk) in Baden-Württemberg, Germany. It lies in the Swabian Jura (plateau), about 15 kilometres (9.3 mi) south of Reutlingen.

It was formed on January 1, 1975 from the former independent municipalities of Großengstingen, Kleinengstingen and Kohlstetten.

Engstingen is located on the northern edge of the Swabian Jura, at 680–750 metres (2,230–2,460 ft) altitude on the Alb plateau near the Alb edge in the valley of Ur-Lauter, about 15 km south of the town Reutlingen.

== Municipality ==
According to the municipal reform on January 1, 1975, the three previously independent municipalities Großengstingen, Kleinengstingen and Kohlstetten and the industrial park Gewerbepark Haid were combined into Engstingen. The village of Großengstingen and the houses at Großengstingen railway station and Haid belonged previously to the former municipality Großengstingen. The former municipalities Kleinengstingen and Kohlstetten each included only these villages respectively.

Großengstingen and Kleinengstingen are lying together, surrounded by a ring of wooded hilltops. The municipality Kohlstetten is about 3.5 km (2.2 mi) northeast and Haid about four km (2.5 mi) south. The deepest point of denunciation, with 673 m (2,208 ft), is located on the railway line at the border to the municipality of Offenhausen; the highest point of 820 m (2,690 ft) on the Judenstein is on the border to the municipality of Meidelstetten.

The following towns and municipalities, which all belong to the district of Reutlingen, share borders with the municipality Engstingen: Lichtenstein, St. Johann, Sonnenbühl, Gomadingen, Trochtelfingen and Hohenstein. The municipality Engstingen teamed-up with the municipality Hohenstein to a Joint Management Community (Verwaltungsgemeinschaft).

== Geology ==
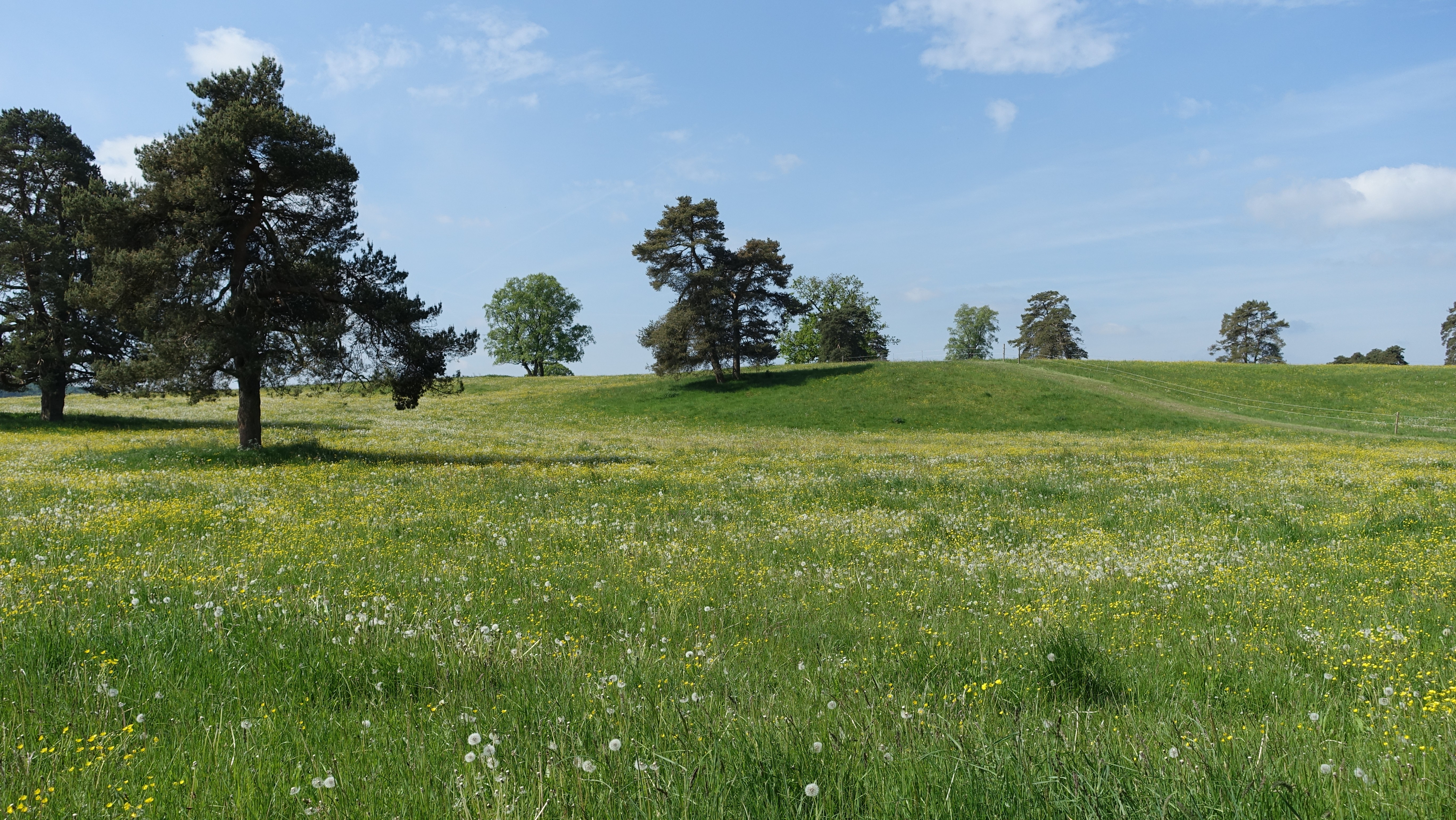
Alb plateau near Haid

The Alb plateau was created when the disk of the White Jurassic was raised before about 50 million years ago. There were many cracks and fissures in the limestone rock, so that rainwater seeps very quickly, and so the Alb is quite low in water. Thus, it is surprising that a mineral spring exists in the municipality of Kleinengstingen.

== History ==
=== Common ===
The earliest permanent settlement traces are from the Hallstatt culture (Tumulus in the area of Haid). The area belonged from the first to the third century to the Roman Empire (Agri Decumates).

During the Thirty Years' War, all three subsites suffered from great population losses, and subsequently Swiss and other foreign families migrated into this area.

=== Großengstingen ===
The earliest document of the name of the place names "Anegistingin" was dated 24 January 783 in a deed of Lorsch Abbey. The Roman Catholic Diocese of Chur acquired some properties at the beginning of the 10th century. In 1439 the name "Großengstingen" appeared for the first time. A rarely used name was "Churengstingen".

The right for free hunting was abolished in 1709 and partially re-introduced from 1713 to 1806 out of courtesy of the duke.

On October 31, 1717 Chur sold Engstingen to the Zwiefalten Abbey. From there it was transferred to the Protestant Württemberg on 30 April 1750. Großengstingen became part of Oberamt Reutlingen in 1806 and became a district (Landkreis) from 1938.

From 1963 to 1993, the Rocket artillery battalion 250 of the Bundeswehr was stationed in the Eberhard Finck barracks in Großengstingen.

=== Kleinengstingen ===
Northwest of Kleinengstingen is an Alemannic row grave field. The oldest known mention of "Clain Engstingen" dates from 1482. The place was sometimes called "Freiengstingen" in the 13th century during the reign of the barons of Engstingen (liber de Anegestingen). However, it was probably already then under the reign of Württemberg. The local reign was finally transferred in 1454 to Württemberg, annexing it to the Amt Pfullingen. From then, it was sometimes mentioned as "Unterengstingen". In 1806 Kleinengstingen came to Oberamt Reutlingen, and in 1938 it became a district.

=== Kohlstetten ===
The oldest known mention of the name "Cholsteten" (from the German words for cabbage or more likely for charcoal) can be found in a document of the Weißenau Abbey of 1161. The place came in 1230 from the Earl of Achalm to the House of Urach and from there in 1265 to Württemberg. The place was very badly damaged in the Thirty Years' War; only the church survived the era relatively unscathed. Kohlstetten was part of the Oberamt Urach (Unteramt or parish Gächingen) within Württemberg. In 1808, it came to the Oberamt Münsingen and became in 1938 a district. In 1973, it became part of the district of Reutlingen.

=== Haid ===
The German Empire under the dictatorship of the Nazis established the ammunition factory Muna Haid in a wooded area about four kilometers south of Großengstingen. During World War II, a small forced-labor and POW camp was connected to the ammunition factory, into which 200 to 300 men and women were mainly deported from France, Russia and Poland. They were either used directly in the ammunition factory or used for agricultural work in the surrounding villages.

Between February and April 1945, Muna Haid was repeatedly bombed by Allied air forces and severely damaged. The Wehrmacht itself blasted the intact remains of the ammunition bunkers shortly before the end of the war and the Nazi dictatorship, so that it would not fall into the hands of the advancing Allied troops. After the war, the site was rehabilitated, after the Federal Republic of Germany was founded in 1949. Initially a sanatorium, then in 1953 a camp for refugees was established, mainly German expellees from the former eastern territories of the German Reich.

The Bundeswehr built some barracks 1957 in the area, which were initially called Haid Barracks and in 1965 renamed to Eberhard Finckh Barracks. Until their closure at the end of 1993, there was also an American unit (84th Field Artillery Detachment) stationed next to the Rocket Artillery 250. They had the oversight and control over the nuclear warheads that were stored in the special ammunition depot Golf in the Eberhard Finck barracks at the road to Meidelstetten. The area around the barracks and the nuclear weapons base was in the 1980s the location of various protest demonstrations of the peace movement, which demonstrated with regional Easter marches with up to 5,000 participants and some multi-week sit-ins against the military presence on the ground.

Since the mid 1990s, the now civilian land is jointly used as a business park by the surrounding communities Engstingen, Hohenstein and Trochtelfingen.

== Population Development ==
| Year | Population |
|---|---|
| 1823 | 1.281 |
| 1864 | 1.760 |
| 1871¹ | 1.842 |
| 1880¹ | 1.908 |
| 1890¹ | 1.868 |
| 1900¹ | 1.957 |
| 1910¹ | 1.913 |
| 1925¹ | 2.025 |

| Year | Population |
|---|---|
| 1933¹ | 2.114 |
| 1939¹ | 2.169 |
| 1950¹ | 2.415 |
| 1956¹ | 2.956 |
| 1961¹ | 3.707 |
| 1965 | 4.118 |
| 1970¹ | 4.280 |
| 1975 | 4.679 |

| Year | Population |
|---|---|
| 1980 | 4.458 |
| 1985 | 4.403 |
| 1987¹ | 4.038 |
| 1990 | 4.291 |
| 1995 | 4.871 |
| 2000 | 5.285 |
| 2005 | 5.519 |
| 2010 | 5.306 |

^{1} Census result, other numbers for each year

== Mayors ==
The mayor is elected for a term of eight years. The previous tenure of Klaus-Peter Kleiner ended by resignation 2013; Small died in the night of 5 to 6 October 2013. Current mayor is Mario Storz since 2013.

=== Previous mayors of districts ===
Großengstingen

- around 1557: Mich(a)el Gerstenecker
- 1885-1919: Claudius Wälder
- 1919-1945: Oskar Gauch
- 1946-1949: Theodor Leippert
- 1949-1963: Martin Staneker
- 1963-1975: Kurt Stemmer

Kleinengstingen

- 1864-1894: Johann Georg Stooß
- 1895-1904: Christian Stooß
- 1904-1920: Christian Baisch
- 1920-1937: Ernst Stooß
- 1937-1946: Ernst Glück
- 1946-1954: Wilhelm Mohl
- 1955-1975: Adam Baisch

Kohlstetten

- 1892-1894: Andreas Failenschmid
- 1894-1915: August Glück
- 1915-1917: Johann Martin Vöhringer
- 1917-1927: Jakob Reitter
- 1927-1945: John Glück
- 1946-1960: Gottlob Nau
- 1960-1975: Christian Spohn

Engstingen (after the municipal reform)

- 1975-1983: Kurt Stemmer
- 1983-2013: Klaus-Peter Kleiner
- from 2013: Mario Storz

== Coat of arms ==
=== Current coat of arms ===
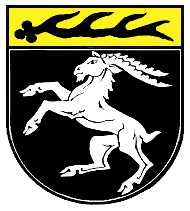
Engstingen

Since 19 January 1978, the coat of arms show a white, ascending Capricorn on a black background, the symbol of the Prince Bishop of Chur in (Switzerland), who possessed the dominion Großengstingen until 1717. At the top is a deer antler on a gold background, which documented the ownership by the house of Württemberg in earlier times.

=== Previous coats of arms ===
| Großengstingen | Kleinengstingen | Kohlstetten |

== Twinning ==
Engstingen is twinned with the Swiss town of Chur in the canton of Grisons, not least because of the common historical past.

== Religions ==
Großengstingen (Diocese of Chur) remained Catholic, while Kleinengstingen and Kohlstetten (both Württemberg) have been reformed to become Protestant (Evangelical Pietist) due to their different relations during the Reformation.

Kleinengstingen belonged initially to the parish of St. Martin in Großengstingen, which was first mentioned in 1275. The Martin Church was built in the Rococo style by Zwiefalten Abbey 1717-1719. The parish includes today also the Catholics of Kleinengstingen and Kohlstetten.

The parish church in Kohlstetten was incorporated in 1496 by the convent Offenhausen and has changed since the Reformation to a Protestant parish. Due to the Reformation came Kleinengstingen of the still Catholic parish to parish Großengstingen Kohlstetten. The present church was built in 1760 and in 1787 expanded.

A Protestant church was built in Kleinengstingen in 1770.

Now the municipality of Engstingen belongs both to the Catholic Church Administration deanery Reutlingen-Zwiefalten of the diocese of Rottenburg-Stuttgart and to church district Bad Urach-Münsingen of the Evangelical Lutheran Church in Württemberg.

== Music ==
Engstingen forms a musical focus point on the Alb with the Sängerbund founded in 1854 Kohlstetten, the Liederkranz Großengstingen of 1858, the Swabian Alb musicians first mentioned on 6 October 1867, the Köhlermusikanten established on 6 March 1953 and the brass band, the mixed choir Kleinengstingen and the church choir St. Martin Großengstingen.

== Museums ==
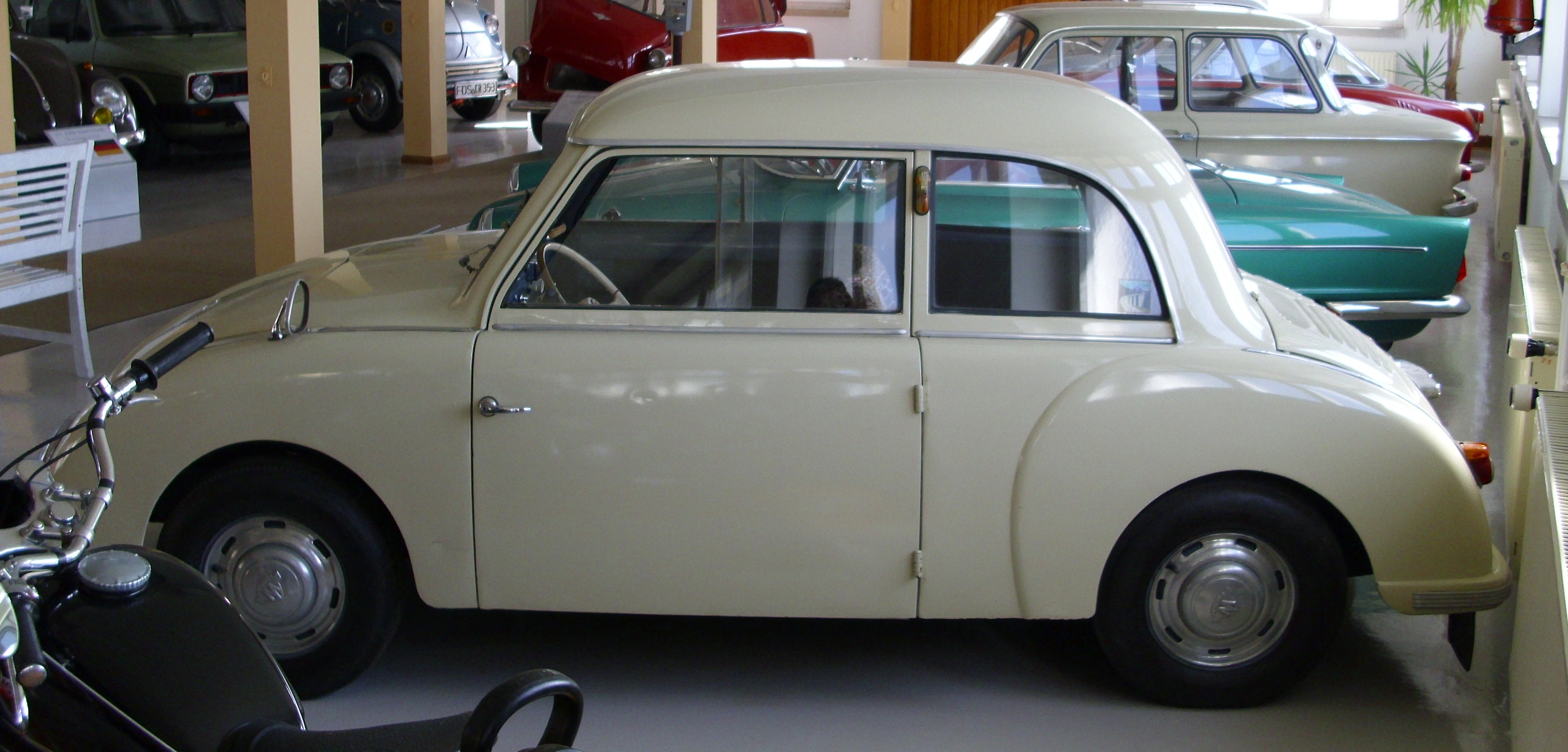
Maico MC 500-4 of 1957 in the Automobile Museum Engstingen

The Automobile Museum Engstingen displays historic cars and motorcycles from the postwar period. The scooter and small car meeting Here takes place here every year on 3 October 3.

== Buildings ==
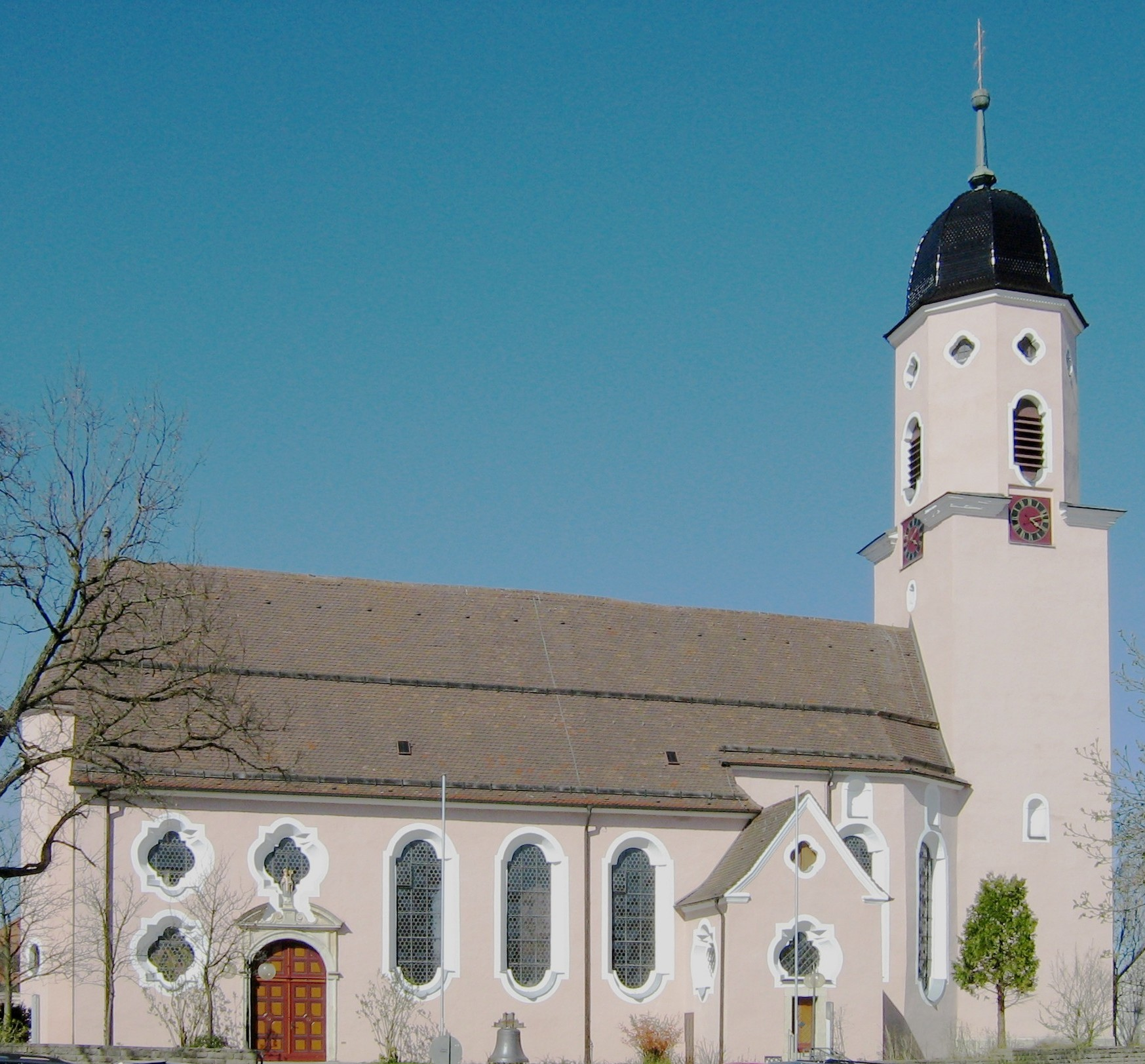
St Martin's Church in Großengstingen

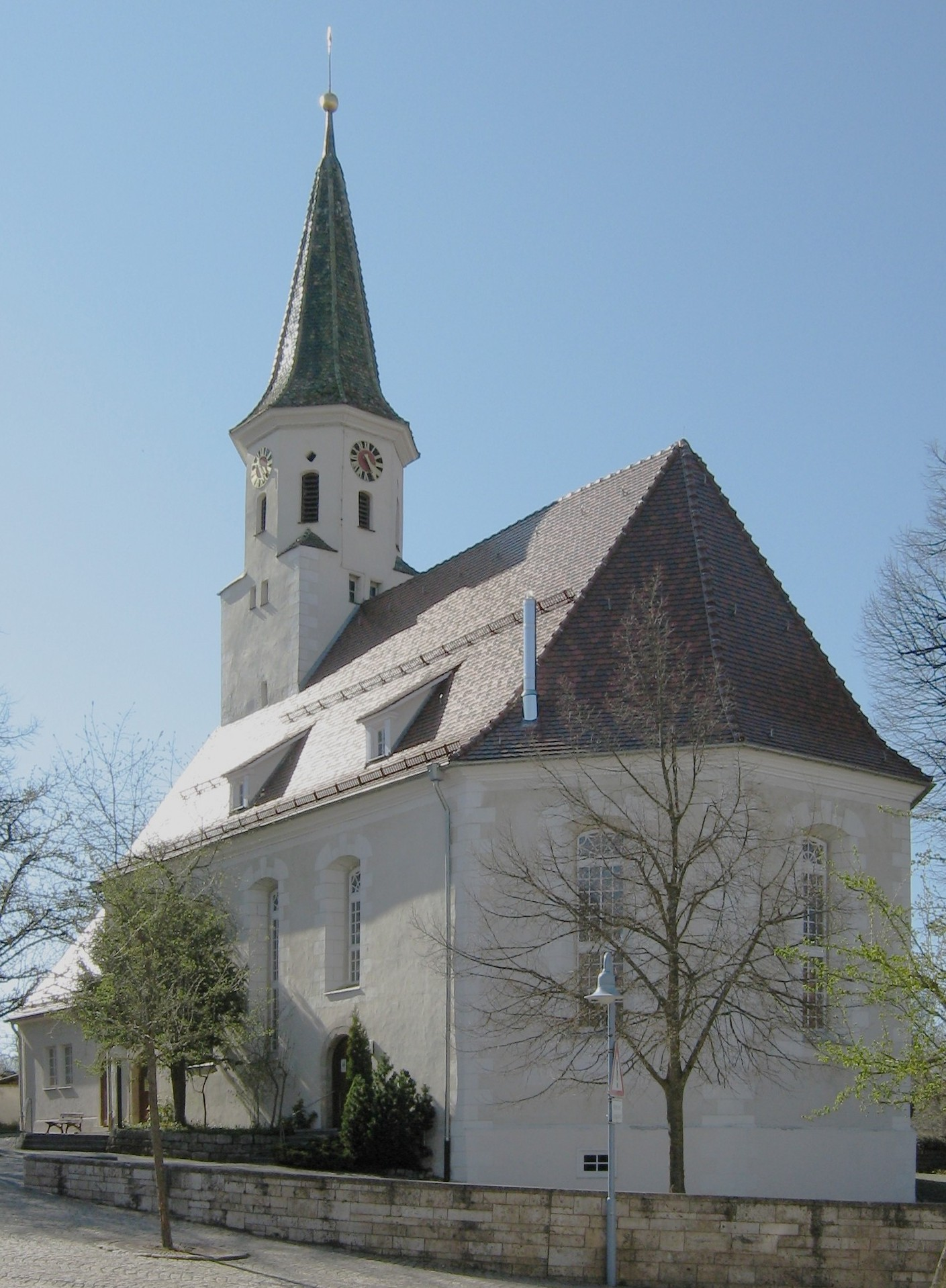
Blasius Church in Kleinengstingen

Around 1580 the only mineral spring on the Alb plateau was discovered in the center of Kleinengstingen and feeds the Sauerbrunnen (acidic well).

1275 a Catholic parish church of St. Martin was first mentioned. The year 1606 is carved into the baptismal font of the baroque church which was finished in 1719 by the builder Franz Beer of Bleichten. The Wendelin chapel in Großengstingen was built in 1750. The church was built in 1770/71 partially above a smaller previous church. Its name comes from Blasius, who was bishop in Sebaste (Armenia) in 316 and died a martyr. For a village church, the Rococo style plant ornaments on dais, pulpit and the ceiling are unusually elaborate and valuable. The organ in the Romantic style from 1862 is listed as cultural heritage.

The Protestant Marienkirche in Kohlstetten in its present form of 1787 has frescoes dating back to 1500. They show an incompletely preserved Marie cycle and various depictions of saints and Old Württemberg coats of arms. The frescoes were rediscovered in 1956/57 and restored during a church renovation.

The Lichtenstein Castle is in the neighboring community Lichtenstein.

== Regular events ==
- January: New Year shooting of the Reservistenkameradschaft Engstingen e.V.
- Carnival Saturday: carnival parade
- Easter Monday: Egg shooting in Großengstingen
- April / May: Charcoal Burner Festival in Kohlstetten
- July: Schlosshof-Hockete, a sit-down party in the castle yard of Großengstingen
- 1st Saturday in August: Kohltalfest of the construction trailer association in Kleinengstingen
- August: Sauerbrunnen-Hockete, a sit-down party at the acidic well of Kleinengstingen
- September Engstingen autumn
- 3 October: Scooter and small car meeting in the district Großengstingen

== Associations ==
- Fischer Club Kohlstetten e.V.
- Kleintierzuchtverein Engstingen-Augstberg e.V.
- Köhler musicians Kohlstetten
- Liederkranz Großengstingen
- Musikverein Großengstingen
- Narrenzunft Großengstingen e.V.
- Horticultural Association Großengstingen
- Horticultural Association Kleinengstingen
- Archers 1905 Engstingen e.V.
- Tennis Club Engstingen
- TSV Kleinengstingen
- Reservistenkameradschaft Engstingen e.V.

== Economy and infrastructure ==
On the grounds of the former Eberhard Finck barracks municipalities Engstingen, Hohenstein and Trochtelfingen who founded in 1994 the industrial park Haid.

== Transport ==
=== Roads ===
The federal Highways, which runs in the north/south direction B 312 and B 313 forks in Engstingen. The B 312 starts at the Bundesautobahn 8 at Stuttgart Airport and runs via Kleinengstingen, Riedlingen and Biberach to Memmingen. The B 313 branches at Plochingen off the B 10 and runs via Großengstingen and Sigmaringen to Stockach.

In east/west direction the national road L 230 branches off from the B 27 in Gomaringen and runs via Kohlstetten to Münsingen near the Autobahn A 8 at Merklingen.

=== Railways ===
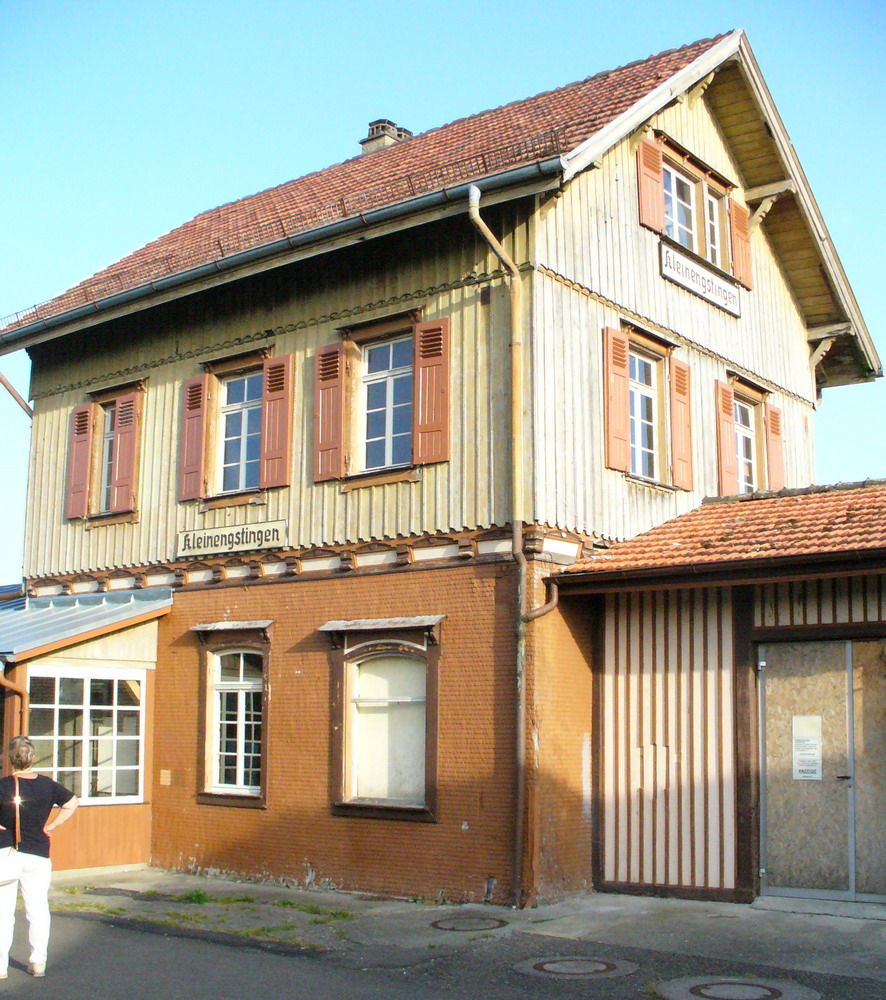
Kleinengstingen railway station

The Royal Württemberg State Railways built the Reutlingen–Schelklingen railway by extending the route form Reutlingen to Honau in 1893 by the cog railway Honau-Lichtenstein and then with a conventional railway track from Kleinengstingen via Kohlstetten to Münsingen and in 1901 further to Schelklingen. Two Standardized railway stations of Type IIa were built at Kleinengstingen and Kohlstetten. With the opening of the route Gammertingen–Kleinengstingen line by the Hohenzollerische Landesbahn, Kleinengstingen became a node in 1901 until the Echaz Valley line was decommissioned in 1969.

The commune is in the comb 224 of the Verkehrsverbund Neckar-Alb-Donau (NALDO).

== Education ==
Großengstingen has as a community center, the primary, secondary and high school Freibühlschule, Kleinengstingen has a primary school with the Steinbühlschule and Großengstingen hosts a Waldorf School.

== Honorary citizens ==
- Claudius Wälder (1885-1968), dean
- 1967: Albert Schwarz, pastor in Großengstingen

== Attractions ==
- Automobile Museum Engstingen
- St. Martin Church in Großengstingen from 1719 with a baptismal font from 1606
- St. Blasius Church in Kleinengstingen from 1771
- Marias Church in Kohlstetten with frescos from 15th/16th century
- Nearby Lichtenstein Castle, belongs to Honau

== Literature ==
- Engstinger Heimatbuch: anlässlich des 1225-jährigen Jubiläums 2008. Herausgeber: Gemeinde Engstingen, 2008
- Friedrichs, Jan Rolf: Die Muna Haid in Engstingen - die Entwicklung einer ehemaligen Militäreinrichtung zu einem Gewerbepark. Oertel & Spörer, Reutlingen 2004 ISBN 3-88627-278-8.
- Lenk, Joachim: Soldaten, Sprengköpfe und scharfe Munition. Wiedemann, Münsingen 2006, ISBN 3-9810687-2-6.
- "Entry". Zedlers Universallexikon. Vol. 8. p. Engstingen.
