= Reutlingen–Schelklingen railway =

Railway line in Germany

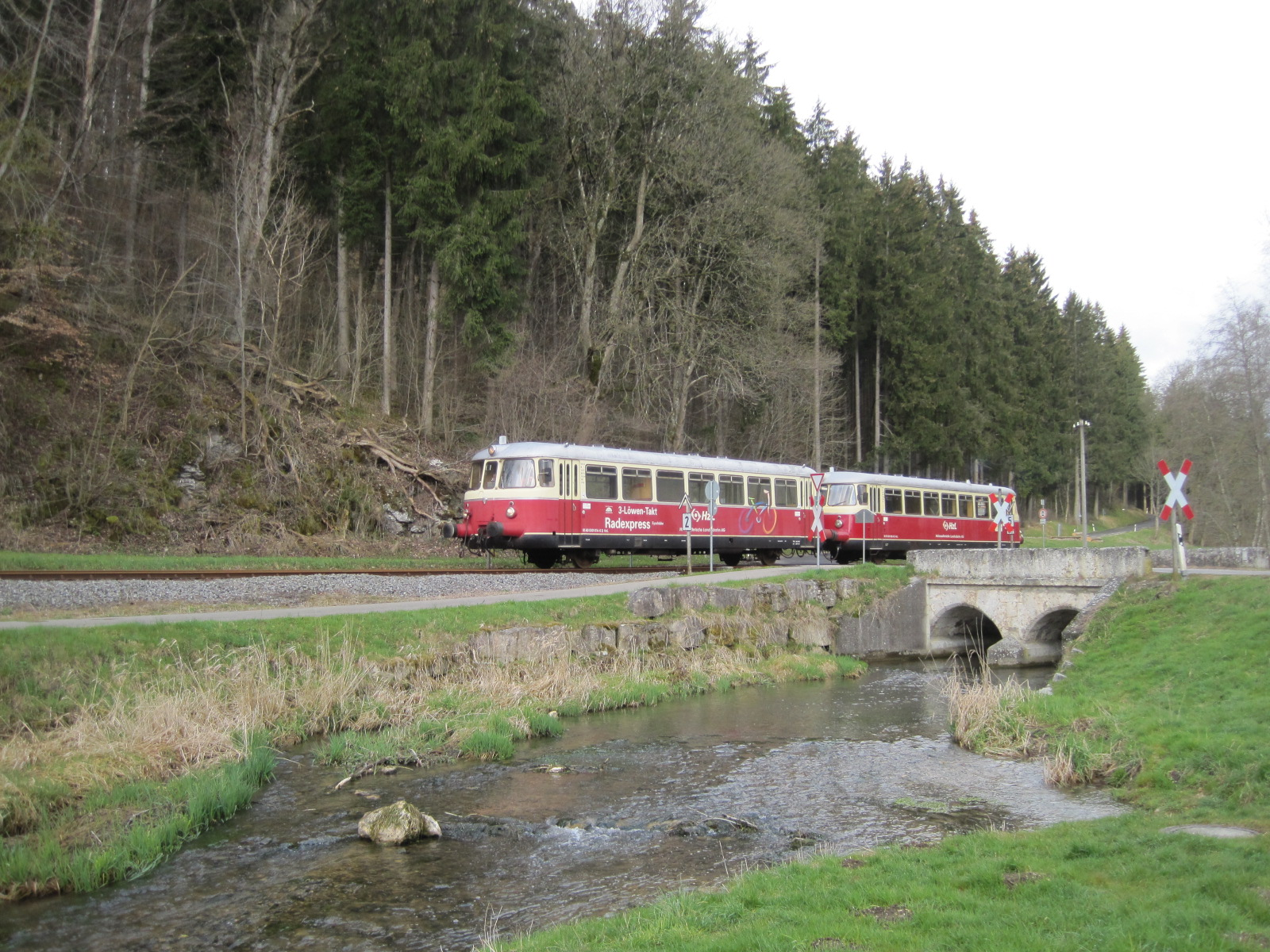
- MAN-Schienenbus on the Swabian Jura Railway

Overview
- Native name: Schwäbische Albbahn
- Line number: 4620
- Locale: Baden-Württemberg, Germany

Service
- Route number: 759 Kleinengstingen–Schelklingen; 764 Reutlingen–Reutlingen Süd

Technical
- Line length: 58.25 km (36.19 mi)
- Track gauge: 1,435 mm (4 ft 8 1/2 in) standard gauge
- Minimum radius: 180 m (591 ft)
- Operating speed: 50 km/h (31.1 mph) (maximum)
- Maximum incline: 10.0%

The Reutlingen–Schelklingen railway or Swabian Jura Railway (German: Schwäbische Albbahn) is a 58.25 kilometre long branch line from Reutlingen to Schelklingen, which crosses the Swabian Jura in southern Germany. Its route no. is 4620. The section from Reutlingen to Honau is also known as the Echaz Railway (Echazbahn) or Echaz Valley Railway (Echaztalbahn). The 15.28 kilometre long northern section from Reutlingen to Kleinengstingen is closed nowadays, this section has been largely converted into a rail trail.

== Photos ==
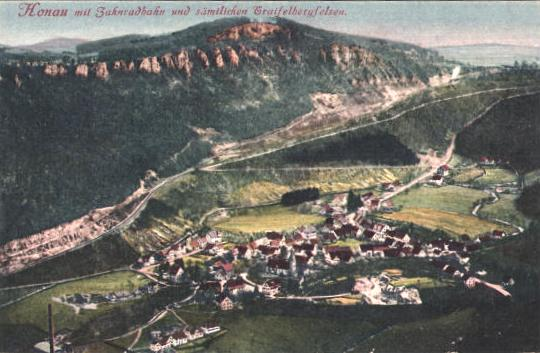
Honau-Lichtenstein rack railway (postcard from 1905)

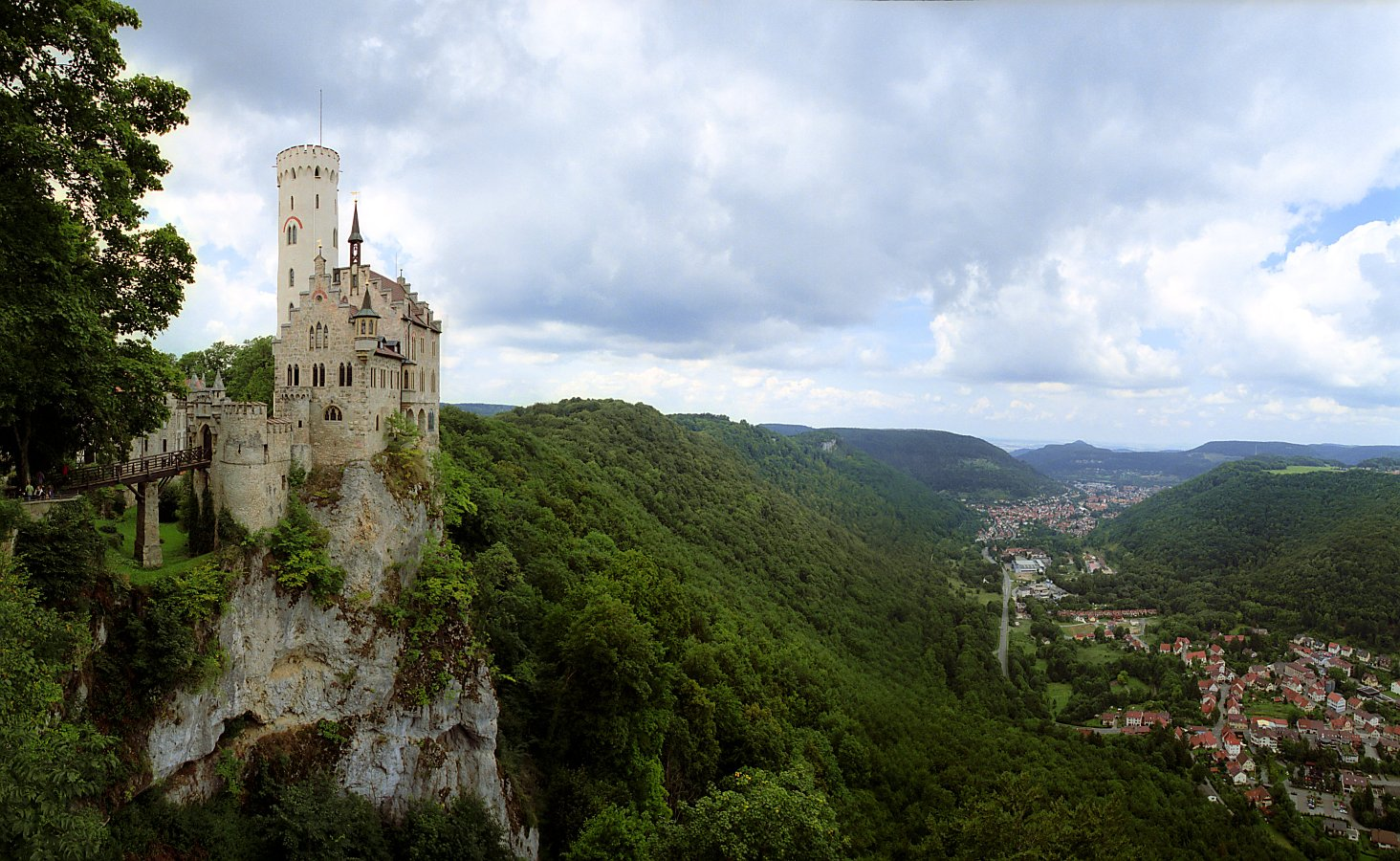
Lichtenstein castle

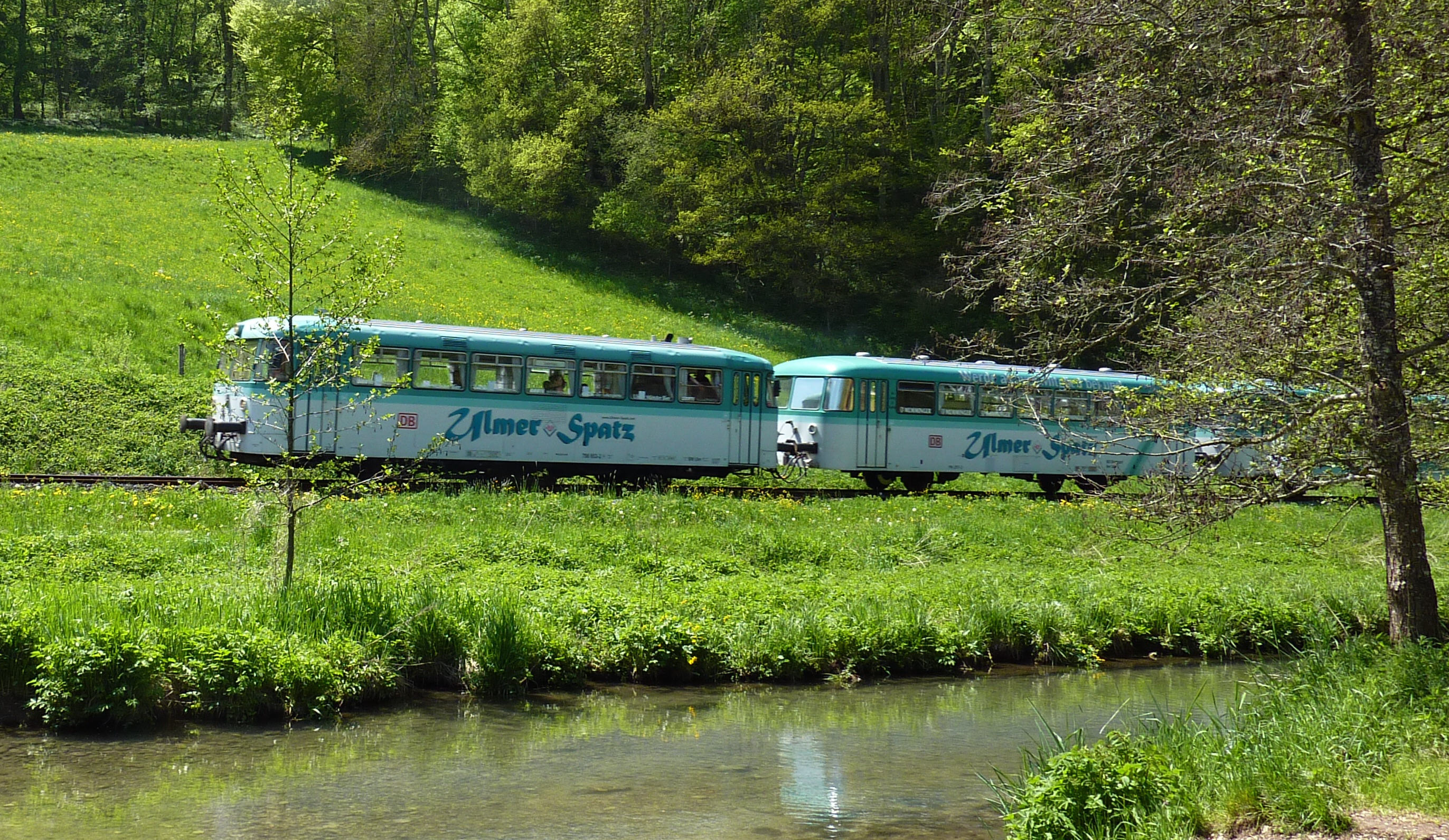
The "Ulmer Spatz"

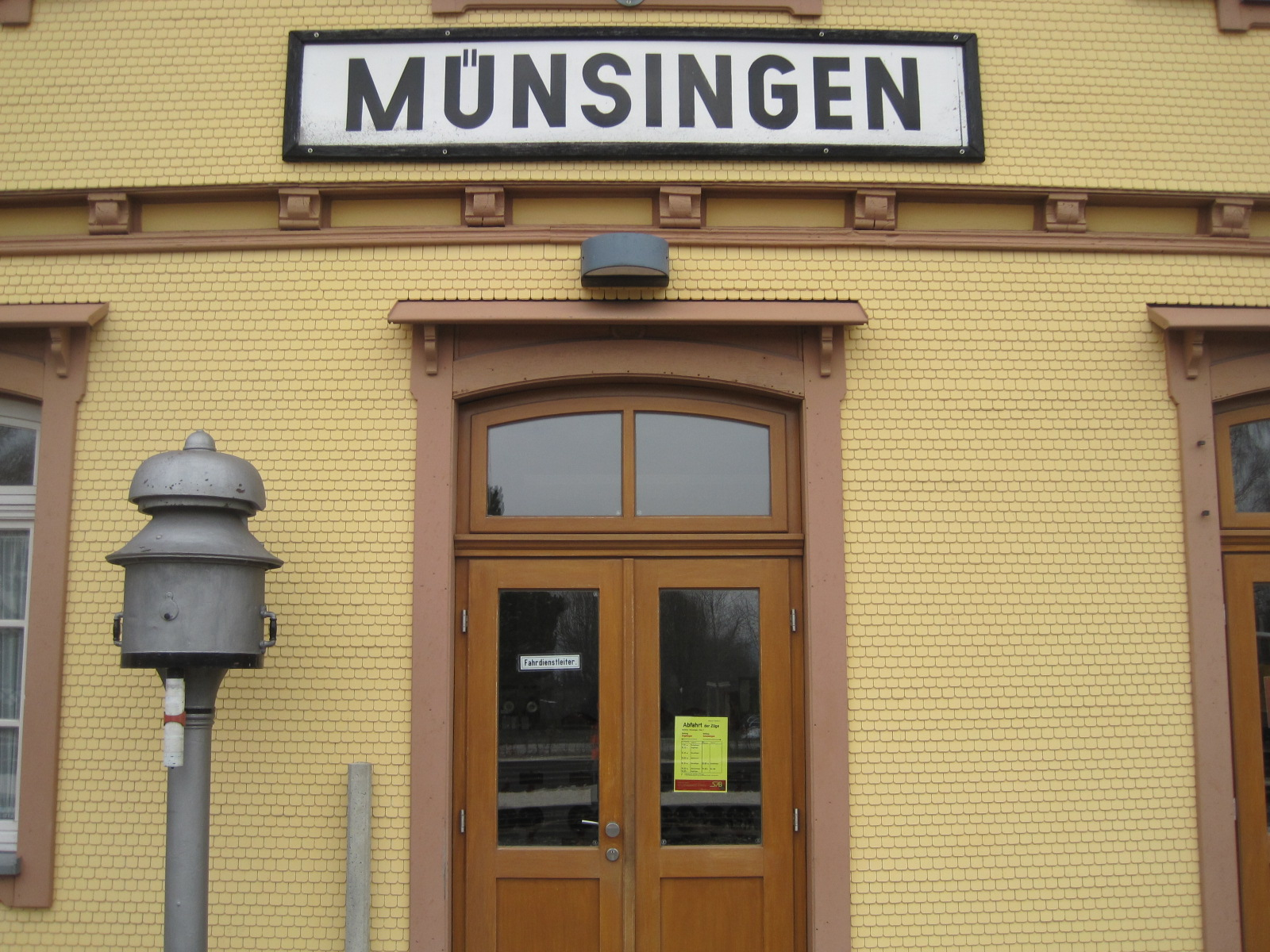
Münsingen station

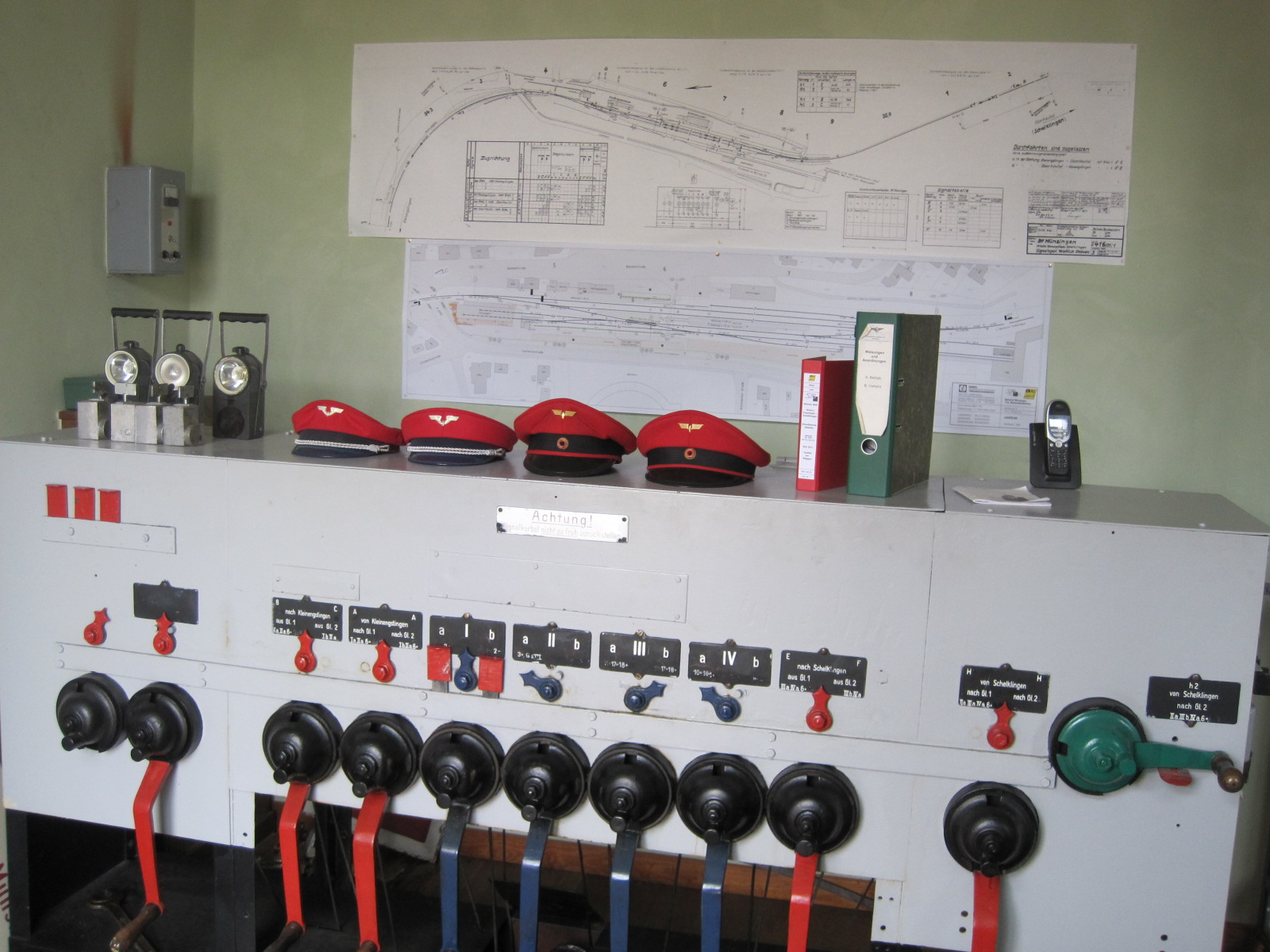
Interior of signal cabin at Münsingen station

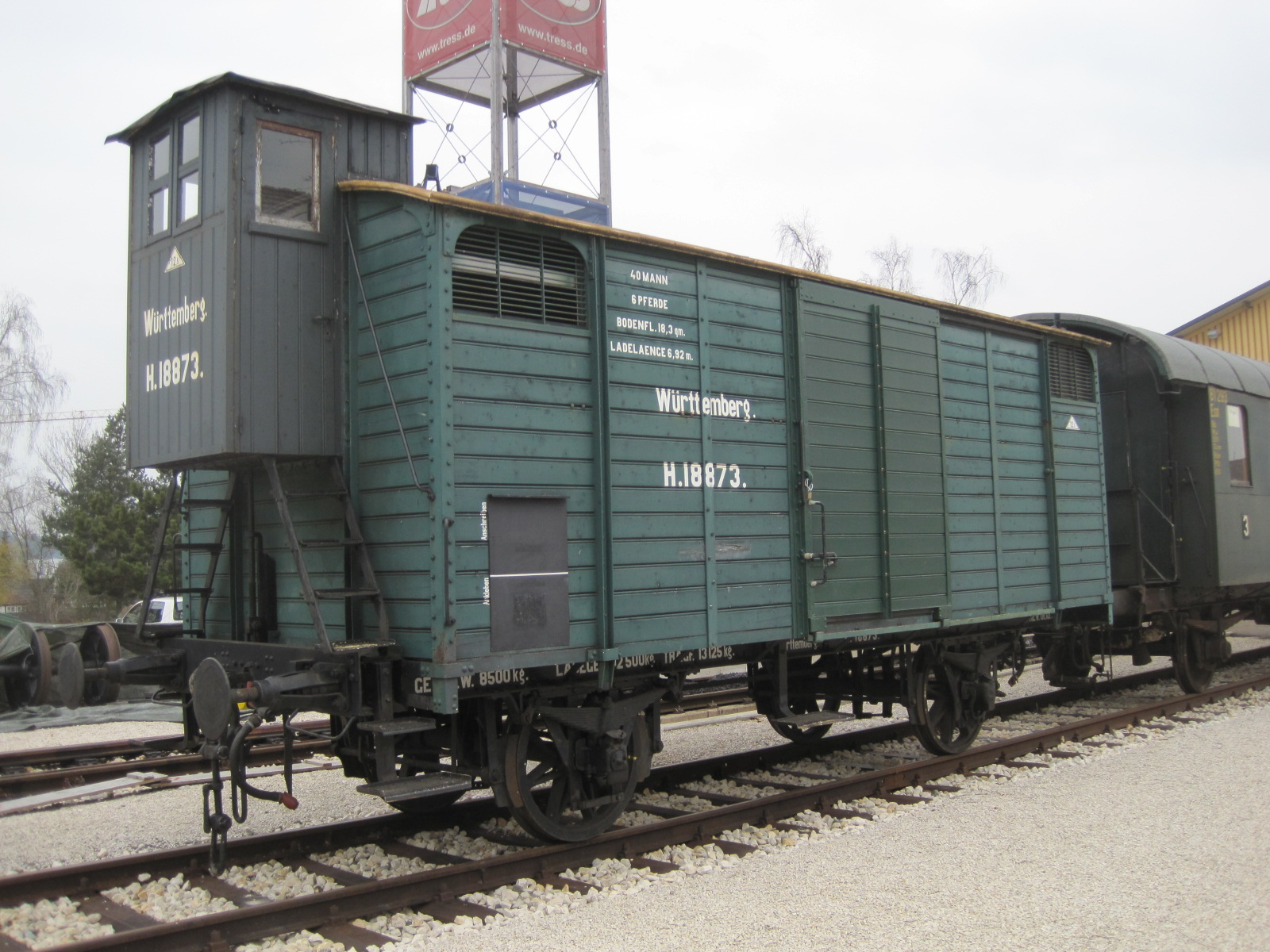
Old goods wagon
