= Bingen, Baden-Württemberg =

Bingen
- Municipality
- Coat of arms

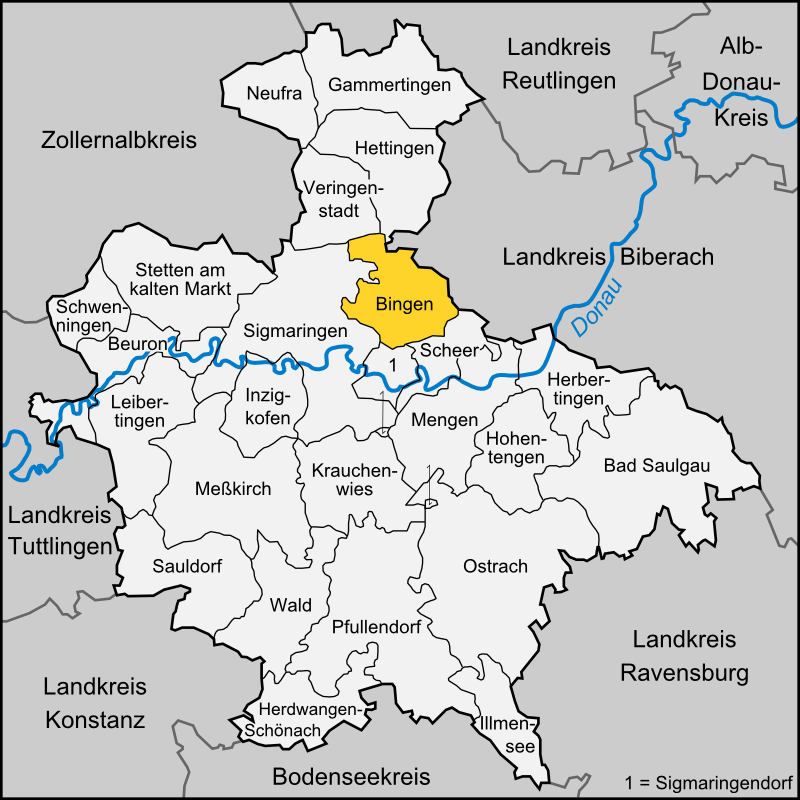
- Location of Bingen within Sigmaringen district
- Interactive map of Bingen
- Location within Germany Location within Baden-Württemberg
- Coordinates: 48°6′42″N 9°16′24″E
- Country: Germany
- State: Baden-Württemberg
- Admin. region: Tübingen
- District: Sigmaringen
- Subdivisions: 4

Government
  - Mayor (2024–32): Marco Potas

Area
  - Total: 37.01 km^{2} (14.29 sq mi)
- Elevation: 600 m (2,000 ft)

Population (2025-12-31)
  - Total: 2,703
  - Density: 73.03/km^{2} (189.2/sq mi)
- Time zone: UTC+01:00 (CET)
  - Summer (DST): UTC+02:00 (CEST)
- Postal codes: 72511
- Dialling codes: 07571
- Vehicle registration: SIG
- Website: www.bingen-hohenzollern.de

Bingen (German pronunciation: [ˈbɪŋən]) is a municipality in the district of Sigmaringen in Baden-Württemberg in Germany.

== Mayors ==
Jochen Fetzer was elected mayor in 2002. He was reelected in October 2010 and 2018. In 2024 Marco Potas was elected mayor.

- Robert Daubenberger (CDU)
- 1978–2002: Paul Mayer (CDU)
- 2003–2024: Jochen Fetzer (independent)
- since 2024: Marco Potas (independent)

== Points of interest ==
- Hornstein Castle Ruin, first noted in 1271, a former Reichsfestung. Between 1818 and 1869 the castle served as an asylum and prison. It was partly demolished in 1879. The castle's chapel is still in good shape and used for religious ceremonies. It contains medieval altars by Magnus Hops.

== Famous people ==
- Johann Schreck S.J. (* 1576 Bingen, † 1630 Beijing), also known as Terrentius Constantiensis, Deng Yuhan Hanpo, Deng Zhen Lohan, Jesuit, Missionary to China, botanist, astronomer
