= Sigmaringendorf =

- Municipality
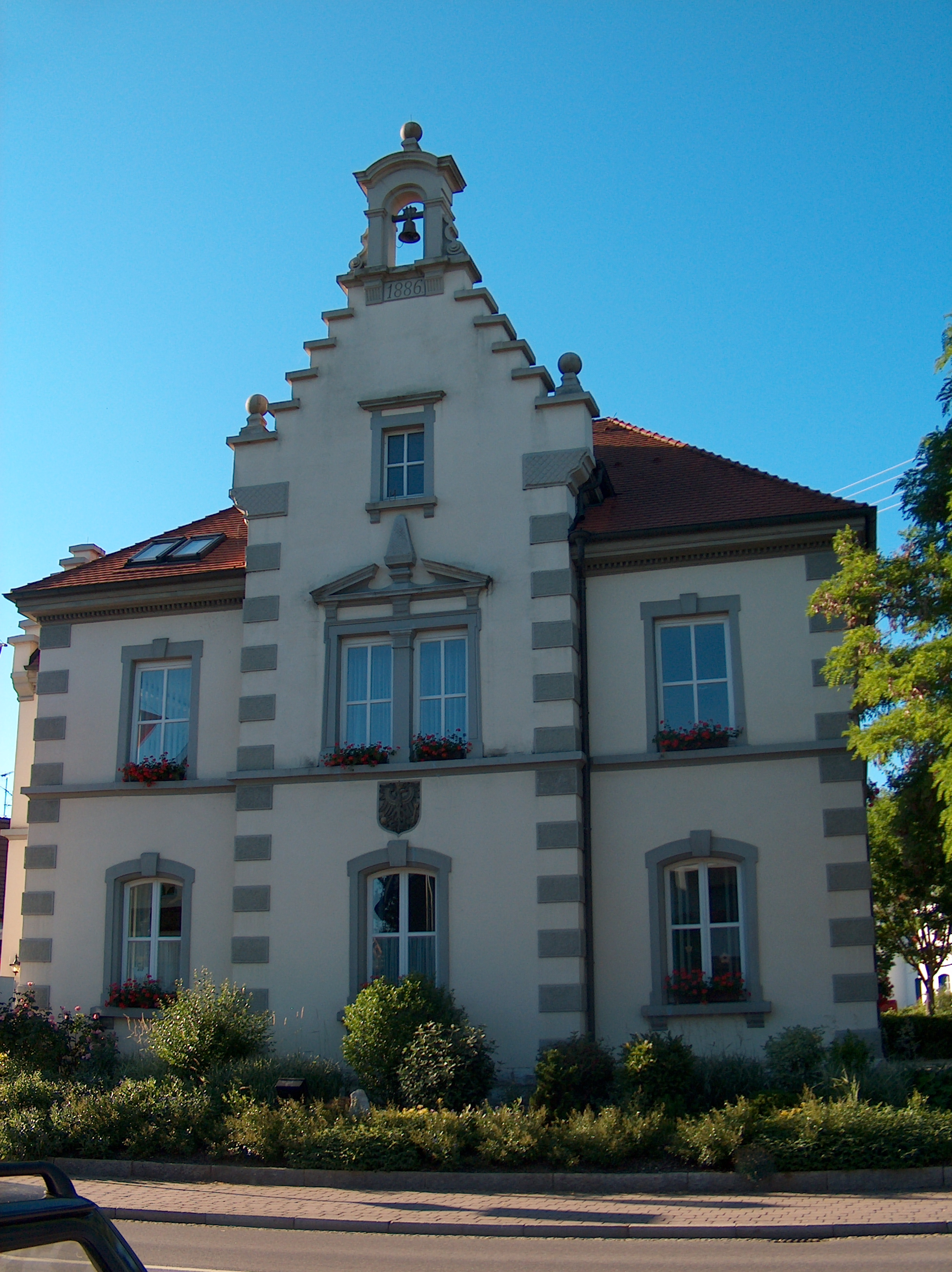
- Town hall

- Coat of arms

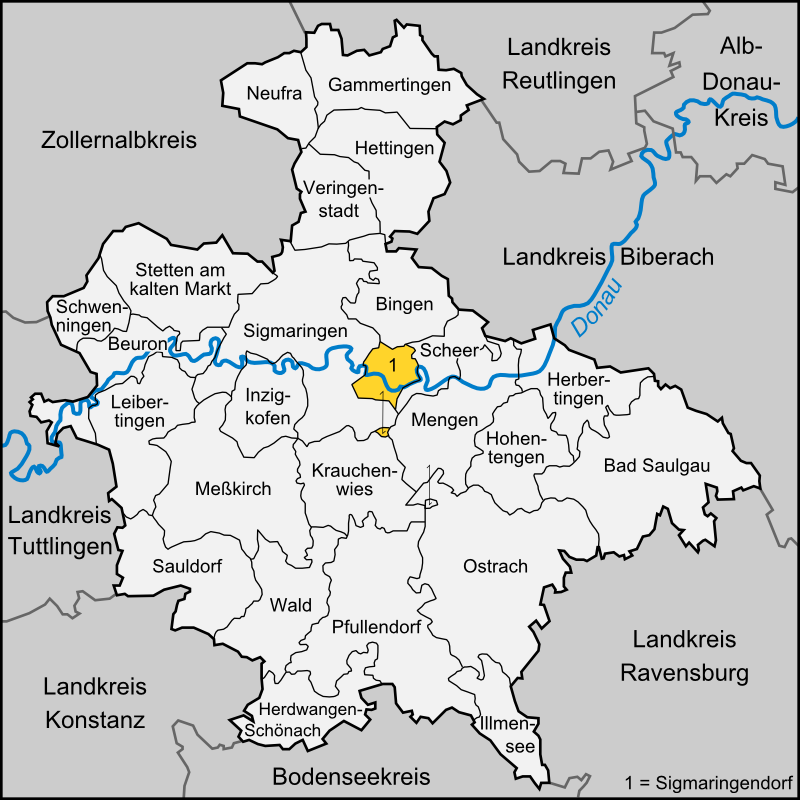
- Location of Sigmaringendorf within Sigmaringen district
- Interactive map of Sigmaringendorf
- Location within Germany Location within Baden-Württemberg
- Coordinates: 48°4′0″N 9°15′51″E
- Country: Germany
- State: Baden-Württemberg
- Admin. region: Tübingen
- District: Sigmaringen

Government
  - Mayor (2017–25): Philip Schwaiger (CDU)

Area
  - Total: 12.47 km^{2} (4.81 sq mi)
- Elevation: 569 m (1,867 ft)

Population (2025-12-31)
  - Total: 3,698
  - Density: 296.6/km^{2} (768.1/sq mi)
- Time zone: UTC+01:00 (CET)
  - Summer (DST): UTC+02:00 (CEST)
- Postal codes: 72517
- Dialling codes: 07571
- Vehicle registration: SIG
- Website: www.sigmaringendorf.de

Sigmaringendorf (Swabian: Semmerengadorf) is a small town in the district of Sigmaringen in Baden-Württemberg in Germany. In Sigmaringendorf the small river Lauchert flows into the Danube. There is an open-air-theatre in Sigmaringendorf, it's called Waldbühne Sigmaringendorf.

== Mayors ==
Since September 2018 Phillip Schwaiger is the mayor of Sigmaringendorf.

- Alois Henne (1980-2018)
- Wilhelm Siebenrock (1946–1953)
- Alois Maucher (1953–1980)
