= Province of Hohenzollern =

Province of Prussia (1850–1946)

Province of Hohenzollern Hohenzollernsche Lande (German)
- Province of Prussia
- 1850–1946
- Flag Coat of arms

- The Hohenzollern Lands (red), within the Kingdom of Prussia (white), within the German Empire (white + light yellow)
- Capital: Sigmaringen
- Area
  - Coordinates: 48°05′N 9°13′E
  - 1939: 1,142 km^{2} (441 sq mi)
- Population
  - 1939: 73,844
- History
  - Established: 1850
  - Disestablished: 1946
Preceded by	Succeeded by
Hohenzollern-Hechingen; Hohenzollern-Sigmaringen	Württemberg-Hohenzollern
- Today part of: Baden-Württemberg

The Province of Hohenzollern (German: Hohenzollernsche Lande, 'Hohenzollern Lands') was a district of Prussia from 1850 to 1946. It was located in Swabia, the region of southern Germany that was the ancestral home of the House of Hohenzollern, to which the kings of Prussia belonged.

The Hohenzollern Lands were formed in 1850 from two principalities that had belonged to members of the Catholic branch of the Hohenzollern family. They were united to create a unique type of administrative district (Regierungsbezirk) that was not a true province – a Regierungsbezirk was normally a part of a province – but that had almost all the rights of a Prussian province. The Hohenzollern Lands lost their separate identity in 1946 when they were made part of the state of Württemberg-Hohenzollern following World War II.

== History ==
The Catholic ruling houses of Hohenzollern-Hechingen and Hohenzollern-Sigmaringen had hereditary treaties with Prussia that went back to 1695 and 1707 respectively. During the German Revolutions of 1848–1849, when the principalities' future came into question, King Frederick William IV of Prussia was initially reluctant to take them over. His historian and advisor Rudolf von Stillfried-Rattonitz told him that if he did not, the two Swabian princes "would inevitably have to throw themselves into the arms of the 400-year-old House of Württemberg, … [Prussia's] hereditary enemy", a disgrace that the king could not bear. In May 1849 he approved a treaty of annexation that was signed on 7 December 1849; the two princes abdicated the same day. The Prussian state took possession of Sigmaringen on 6 April 1850 and of Hechingen on 8 April. The two former principalities were then merged into one governmental district with administrative headquarters in the town of Sigmaringen.

The Hohenzollern Lands, with a total population of only about 65,500 in 1850, were smaller in size and less populous than any of the full Prussian provinces. The district was subordinate overall to ministries in Berlin, although since it had the status of a province, it was represented in the Prussian State Council (Staatsrat), and its district president was equal to the governors (Oberpräsidenten) of Prussian provinces. Many of its administrative functions, however, were the responsibility of the nearby Rhine Province.

During the Austro-Prussia War of 1866, the Hohenzollern Lands were occupied from 27 June to 6 August by troops from Württemberg, which fought with the German Confederation on the losing Austrian side of the war.

In 1875 Prussia established provincial associations (Provinzialverbänden), bodies of local self-government that were above the municipalities and the rural and urban districts, and that replaced the older, lower-level administrative districts. With their formation, the Hohenzollern Lands gained self-government through a Landeskommunalverband, a corporate body under public law for the self-administration of the district and for which a district parliament (Kommunallandtag) was elected. Both remained in existence until 1973. The Hohenzollern Lands' court of appeal until 1879 was in Arnsberg, about 450 km to the north. After that the Higher Regional Court in Frankfurt am Main was responsible. Its military, higher education system and medical system were under the jurisdiction of the Rhine Province.

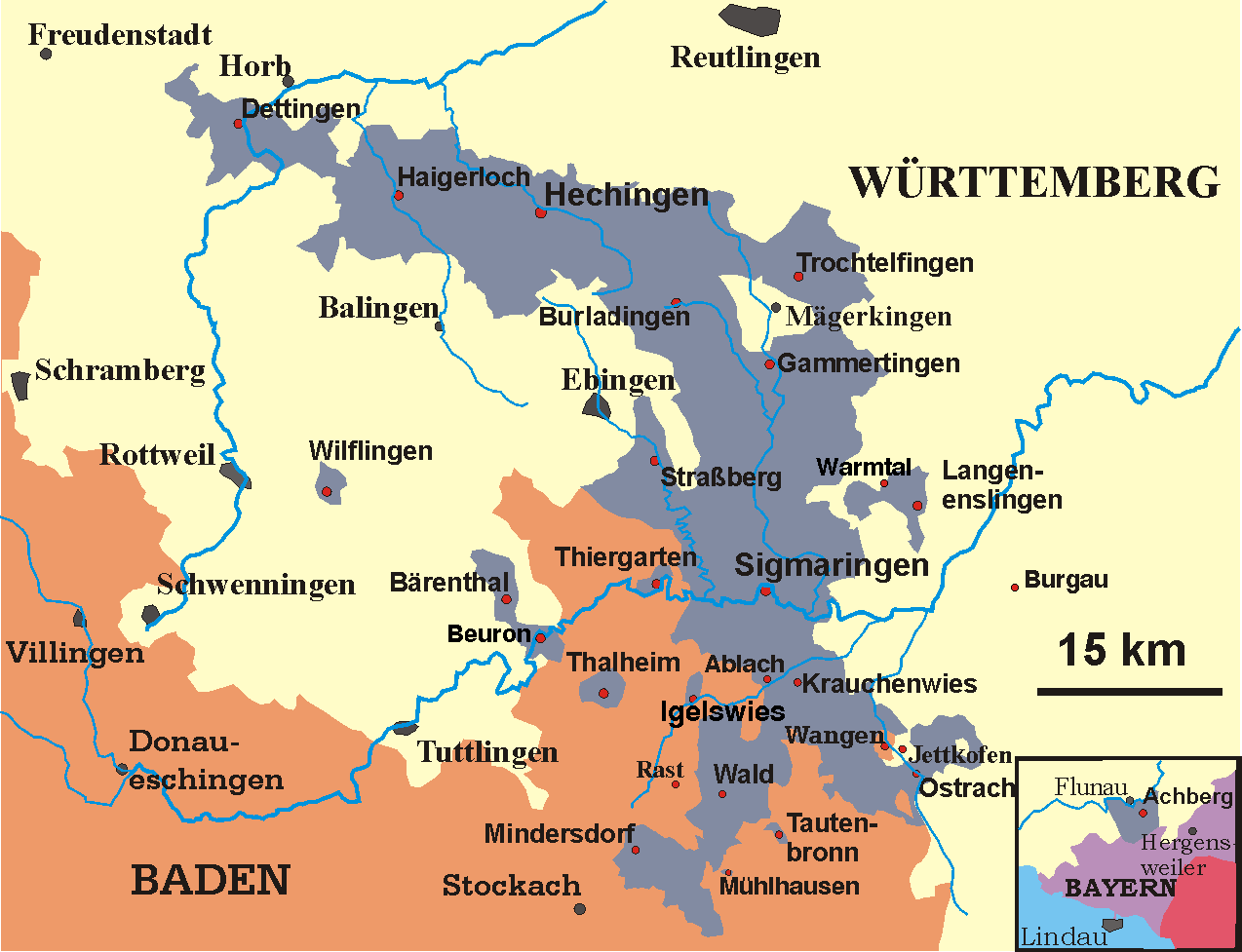
Map of the Hohenzollern Lands (in dark blue gray)

The administration of the Sigmaringen district, which performed the tasks of a state government, was initially divided into the seven Hohenzollern upper bureaus (Oberämter) of Gammertingen, Haigerloch, Hechingen, Ostrach, Sigmaringen, Trochtelfingen and Wald. In 1925 the upper administrative districts (Oberamtsbezirke) Gammertingen, Haigerloch, Hechingen and Sigmaringen were combined to form the two new Oberämter, Hechingen and Sigmaringen.

In 1918, following World War I, the Hohenzollern Lands became a province of the Free State of Prussia, and their overall status remained unchanged during the life of the Weimar Republic. In 1933, after the Nazi seizure of power, all provincial functions were de facto suspended and provinces were placed under direct rule. The Hohenzollern Lands belonged to the Nazi Gau (territory) of Württemberg-Hohenzollern under Gauleiter and Reichsstatthalter (Reich governor) of Württemberg Wilhelm Murr. The Hohenzollern Lands nevertheless formally remained a Prussian administrative district.

After World War II the area became part of the French occupation zone. In 1946 the military government united it with the southern part of the former state of Württemberg to form the state of Württemberg-Hohenzollern with Tübingen as its capital. It became part of West Germany when it was established in 1949. The districts of Hechingen and Sigmaringen were retained, even when Württemberg-Hohenzollern was absorbed into Baden-Württemberg in 1952.

The Hohenzollern Lands' boundaries were lost during the district reform of Baden-Württemberg in 1973. Today the area is divided among nine rural districts (Landkreise) within three administrative districts, all of which include non-Hohenzollern areas. The majority lies in the Sigmaringen and Zollernalbkreis Landkreise, whose borders partly coincide, especially in the north, with those of the former Hohenzollern Lands.

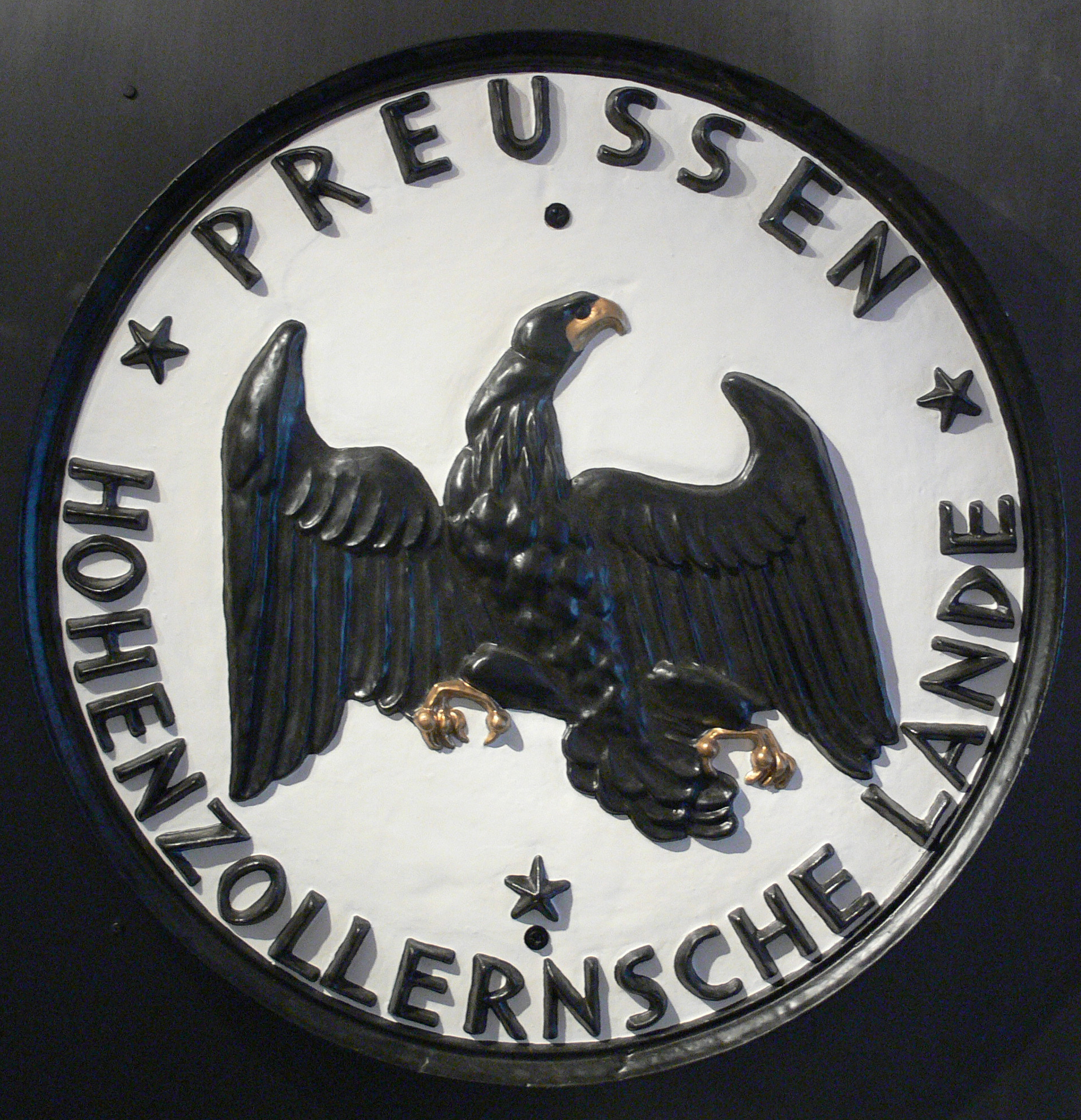
Emblem of the Hohenzollern Lands with the eagle of the Free State of Prussia

== Population ==
Year	Population
1852	65,634
1880	67,624
1890	66,085
1900	66,780
1905	68,282
1910	71,011
1925	71,840
1933	72,991
1939	73,706

== See also ==
- Category:People from the Province of Hohenzollern
- Rhine Province
