= Gammertingen =

- Town
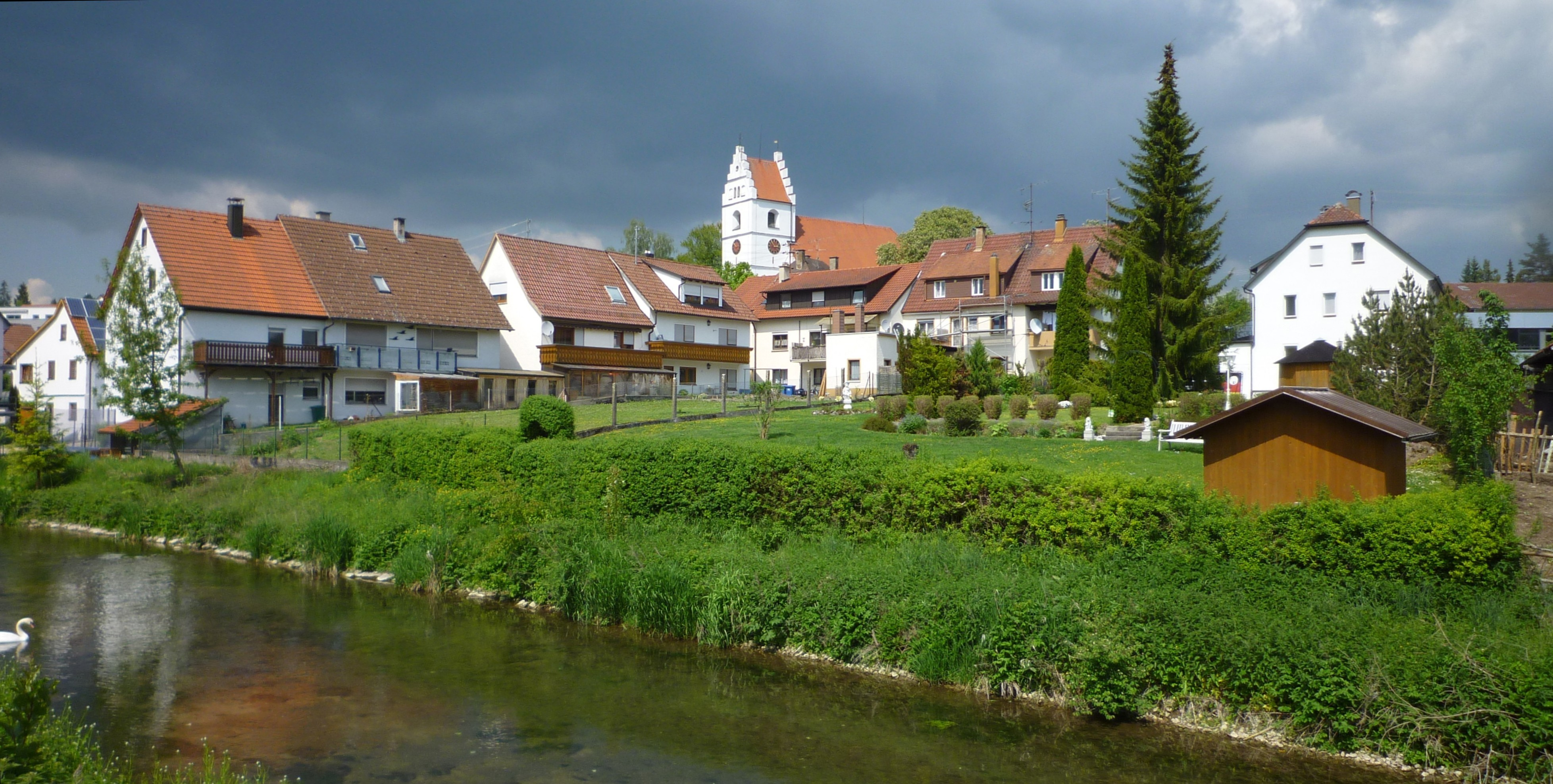

- Coat of arms

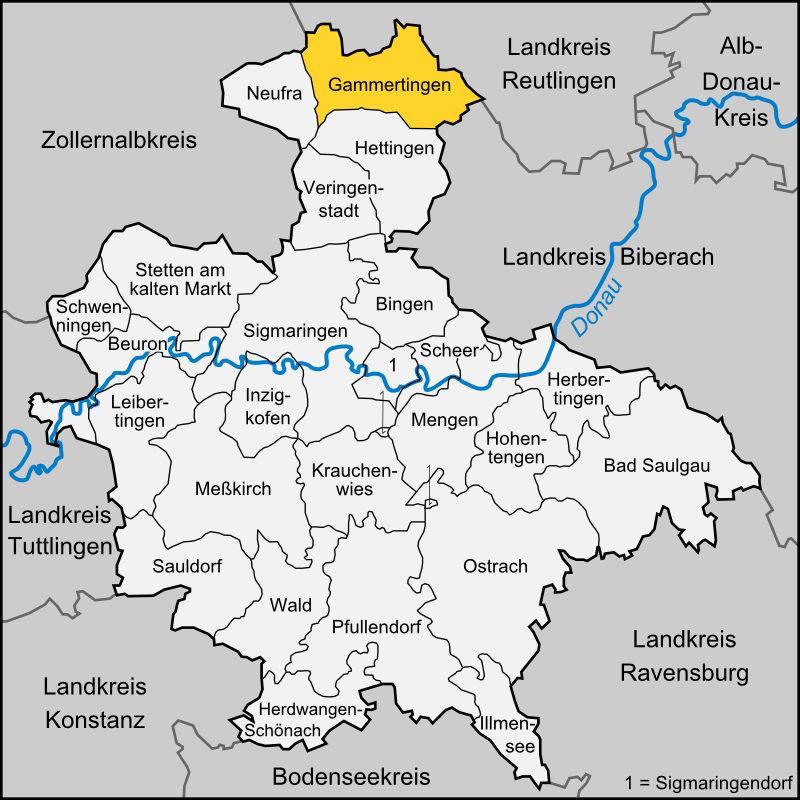
- Location of Gammertingen within Sigmaringen district
- Interactive map of Gammertingen
- Location within Germany Location within Baden-Württemberg
- Coordinates: 48°14′58″N 9°13′3″E
- Country: Germany
- State: Baden-Württemberg
- Admin. region: Tübingen
- District: Sigmaringen

Government
  - Mayor (2023–31): Andreas Schmidt

Area
  - Total: 52.97 km^{2} (20.45 sq mi)
- Elevation: 662 m (2,172 ft)

Population (2025-12-31)
  - Total: 6,198
  - Density: 117.0/km^{2} (303.1/sq mi)
- Time zone: UTC+01:00 (CET)
  - Summer (DST): UTC+02:00 (CEST)
- Postal codes: 72497–72501
- Dialling codes: 07574
- Vehicle registration: SIG
- Website: www.gammertingen.de

Gammertingen (German pronunciation: [ˈɡamɐtɪŋən]) is a town in the district of Sigmaringen, in Baden-Württemberg, Germany. It is situated 18 km north of Sigmaringen.

== Geography ==
=== Geographical location ===
Gammertingen is located on the Swabian Jura in the valley of the Lauchert, a tributary of the Danube.

=== Neighbouring communities ===
The following cities and towns are adjacent to the city of Gammertingen. They are called the clockwise, starting in the Northeast:

Pfronstetten (Reutlingen (district)) Langenenslingen (Biberach (district)) Hettingen, Neufra, Burladingen (Zollernalbkreis), Trochtelfingen (Reutlingen (district)).

=== Constituent communities ===
In addition to the core city of Gammertingen with around 5000 inhabitants belong to the whole city five districts, among them the three boroughs Feldhausen, Harthausen and Kettenacker together with the princely Hohenzollern domain Lusthof on the plateau of the Swabian Jura, Bronnen and Mariaberg.

== History ==
The well-known Helmet of Gammertingen and other rich grave goods from a number of burial grounds provide the information of an early settlement in the time of the Merovingian dynasty. Gammertingen was first mentioned in 1101 in a document of the Kloster Allerheiligen, Schaffhausen. Gammertingen was first mentioned in 1311 as a city. During the time of the Hohenzollern and later Prussian times, Gammertingen was the seat of Oberamt, district court, forestry department and land registry.

During the Nazi era, a Reichsarbeitsdienst camp for females was located in Gammertingen.

Coat of arms	District	Inhabitants	Surface area
Gammertingen	Gammertingen (main locality)	5.000	1.769 ha
Bronnen	Bronnen	> 500	?
Feldhausen	Feldhausen	ca. 400	991 ha
Harthausen	Harthausen	~ 250	671 ha
Kettenacker	Kettenacker	ca. 300	1.084 ha
Kein Wappen Verfügbar	Mariaberg	> 500	?

== Notable people ==
- John O. Henes (1852–1923), American businessman and philanthropist
