= Tübingen–Sigmaringen railway =

Railway main line in Baden-Württemberg, Germany

Tübingen Hbf–Sigmaringen railway
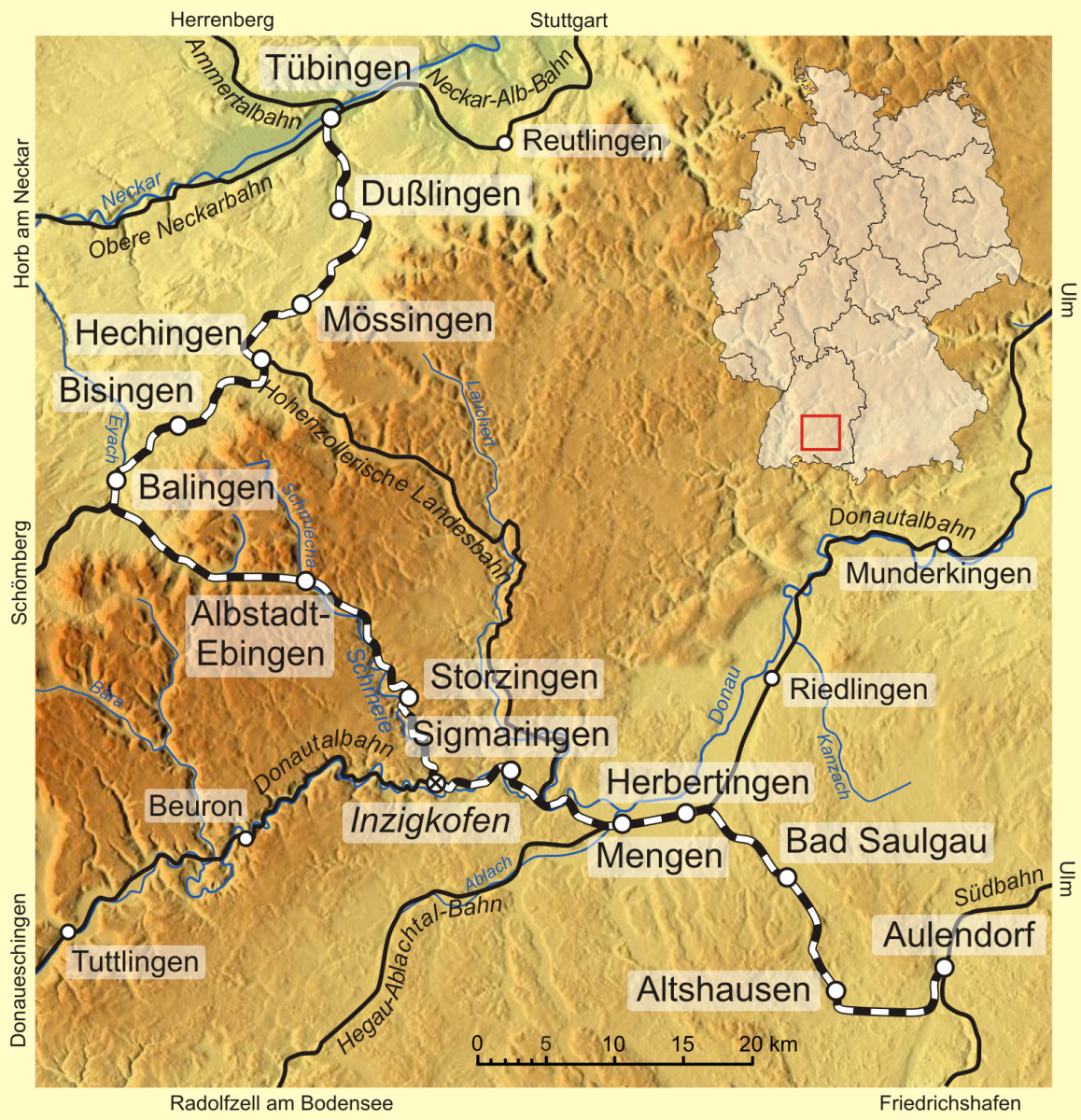

Overview
- Native name: Zollernalbbahn
- Line number: 4630
- Locale: Baden-Württemberg, Germany

Service
- Route number: 766

Technical
- Line length: 87.5 km (54.4 mi)
- Track gauge: 1,435 mm (4 ft 8 1/2 in) standard gauge

The Tübingen Hbf–Sigmaringen railway (also known in German as the Zollernalbbahn—Zollernalb Railway) is a main line railway in the German State of Baden-Württemberg. It runs from Tübingen to Sigmaringen. It is consistently single track and non-electrified, but it is equipped for the operation of tilting trains.

Deutsche Bahn calls the Zollernalb line the Zollern-Alb-Bahn 1 (ZAB 1) to distinguish it from the Zollern-Alb-Bahn 2, the trunk line of the Hohenzollerische Landesbahn.

== Route ==
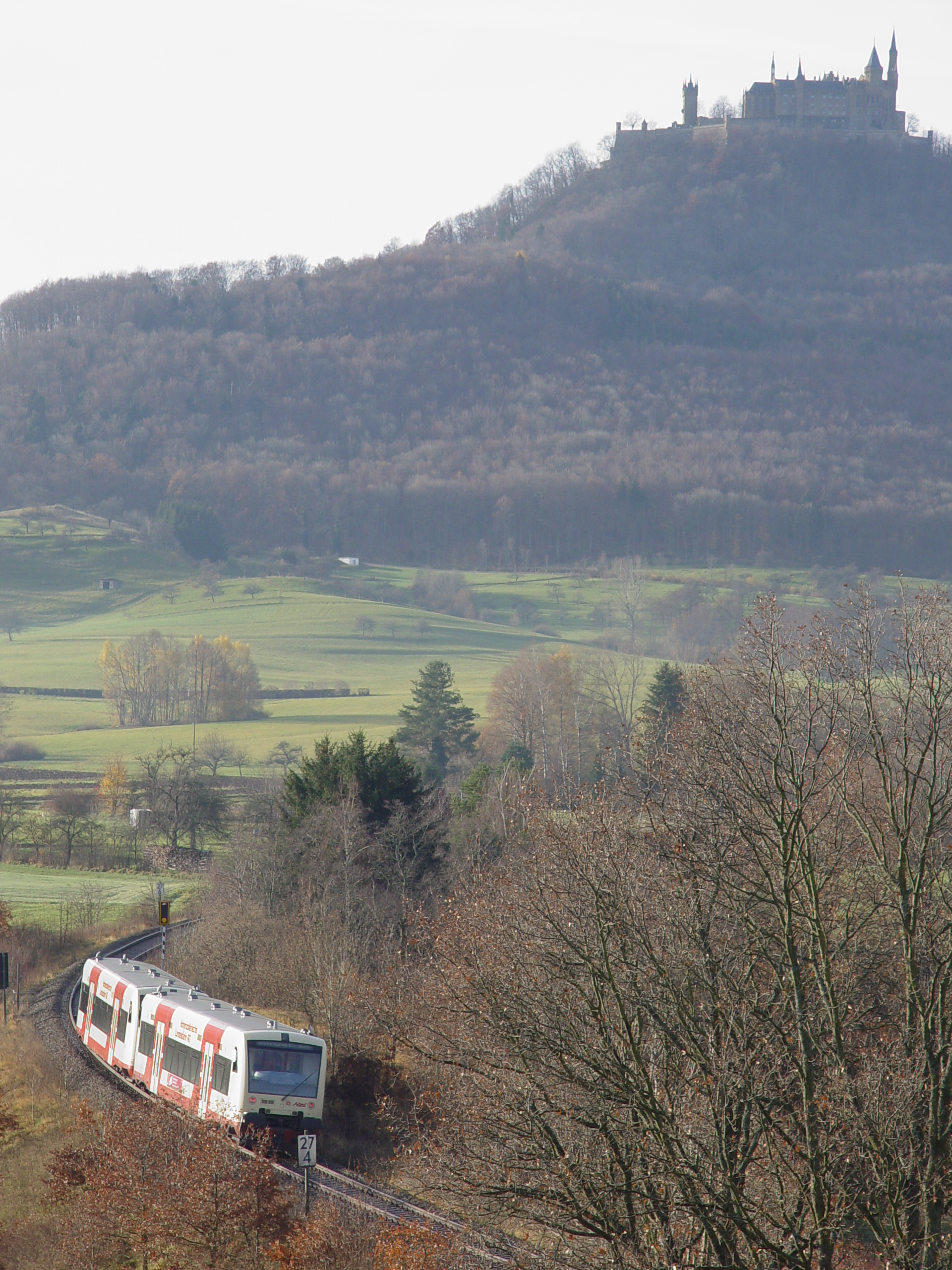
Regionalbahn train below Hohenzollern Castle near Hechingen

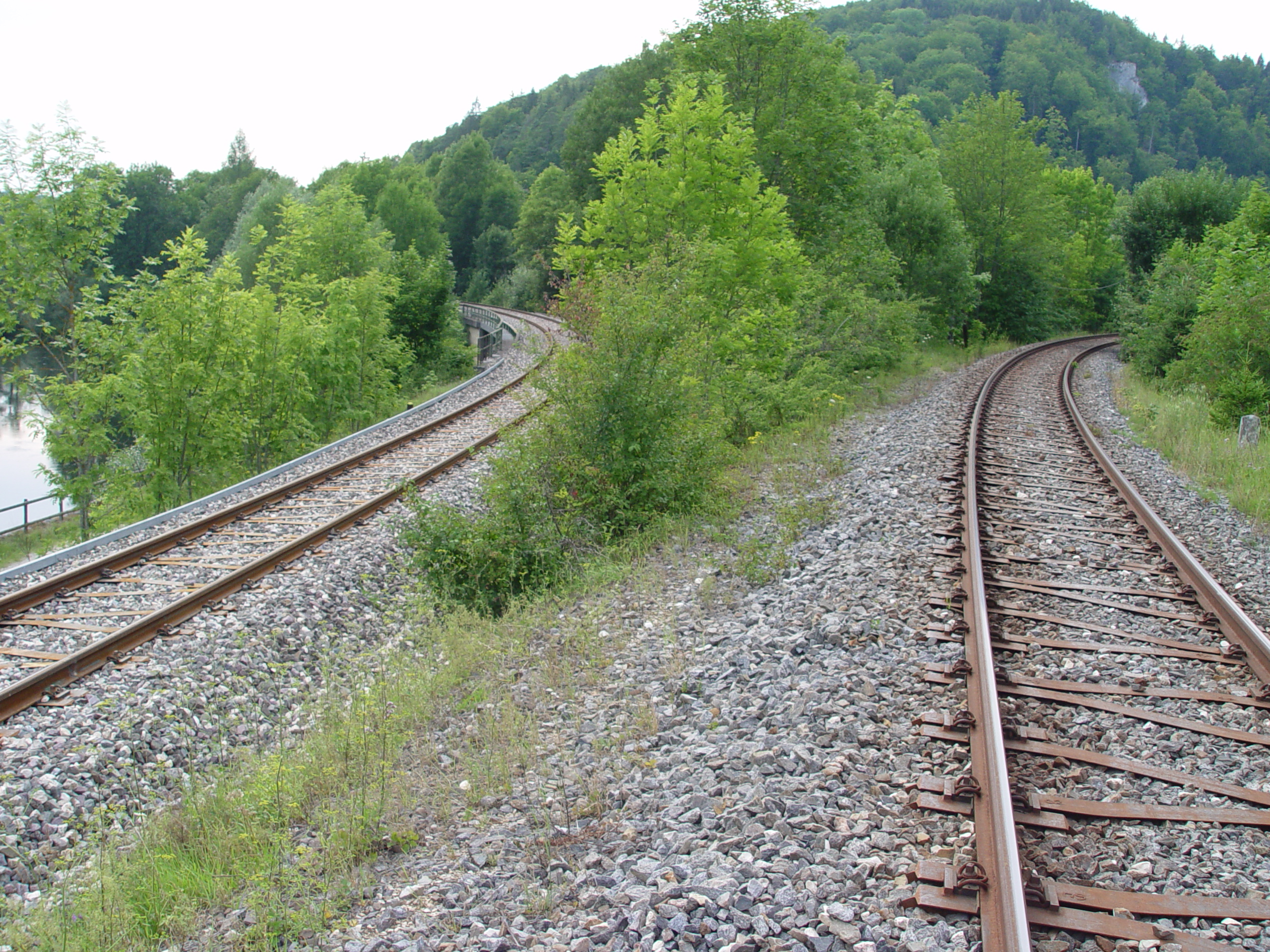
Separation of the Tuttlingen–Inzigkofen railway and the Tübingen–Sigmaringen railway west of Inzigkofen

The line starts at 320 metres above sea level, when it leaves Tübingen Central Station to the west, with some services from Stuttgart running on from the Neckar-Alb Railway, and immediately swings to the south along the valley of Steinlach, which it follows to Bodelshausen. In Hechingen, the station is located north of the city and above the station of the Hohenzollerische Landesbahn; there is a track connecting the lines. After leaving Hechingen station, the Zollernalb Railway runs around the town to the south and continues to run to the southwest to Balingen, where it reaches a height of 517 m. South of Balingen the line runs to the southeast, up the valley of the Eyach and overcomes a long climb of 1 in 45, reaching the highest point of the line of about 730 metres before Albstadt-Ebingen. On the climb is the largest bridge on the line, the 77.35 metre-long viaduct in Albstadt-Lautlingen. The line continues down the Schmeie river, which it frequently crosses and, after passing through two tunnels, eventually reaches the valley of the Danube at Inzigkofen, where it joins the Tuttlingen–Inzigkofen railway. Immediately after crossing the river, the line reaches Sigmaringen station at 574 m above sea level.

== History ==
The Zollernalb line, running from Tübingen to Sigmaringen via Hechingen, also known as the Hohenzollern Railway (Hohenzollernbahn), was built during the fourth period of construction of the Royal Württemberg State Railways (Königlich Württembergischen Staats-Eisenbahnen) from 1867 to 1878. A treaty signed on 3 March 1865 dealt with the issues between Württemberg and Prussia, because the line crossed Prussia's Hohenzollern Province (Hohenzollernsche Lande).

The first section between Tübingen and Hechingen was opened to traffic on 29 June 1869. The inauguration of the line between Hechingen and Balingen was delayed to 1 August 1874 by the Franco-Prussian War. The remaining section to Sigmaringen was opened on 1 July 1878. The construction period of approximately nine years can be explained by the fact that many engineering structures had to be built and the line suffered from difficult ground conditions, requiring a total of 32 bridges. The steep section between Balingen and Ebingen was built largely on an embankment in order to avoid landslides as a result of poor soil conditions on the escarpment.

The total length of the Tübingen–Sigmaringen line was 87.505 km, of which 40.409 km lay in Hohenzollern, then Prussian territory. The construction costs amounted to 23,316,753.12 marks. Under the treaty, the maintenance of the entire line was the sole responsibility of the Royal Württemberg Railway.

In 1922, the Zollernalb Railway between Tübingen and Sigmaringen had a total of 22 stations served by passenger trains, including a station called Zollern for the royal visitors to the Hohenzollern Castle. Over the next several decades the less frequented stations were closed. During 1997, modern diesel multiple units with strong acceleration were introduced on the line and Engstlatt station was reopened and a new station called Albstadt-Ebingen West was opened. In the early 1980s, the old Albstadt-Laufen station, which was some distance from the town was replaced by a station in the town. The former station is now an operating station used as a crossing loop on the single track line; an additional crossing loop was built as part of Albstadt-Ebingen West station. The upgrading of the Zollernalb Railway for the operation of tilting trains, which was completed in 2001, included the construction of new platforms and underpasses at the stations of Dußlingen, Mössingen, Bisingen and Albstadt-Ebingen.

== Operations ==
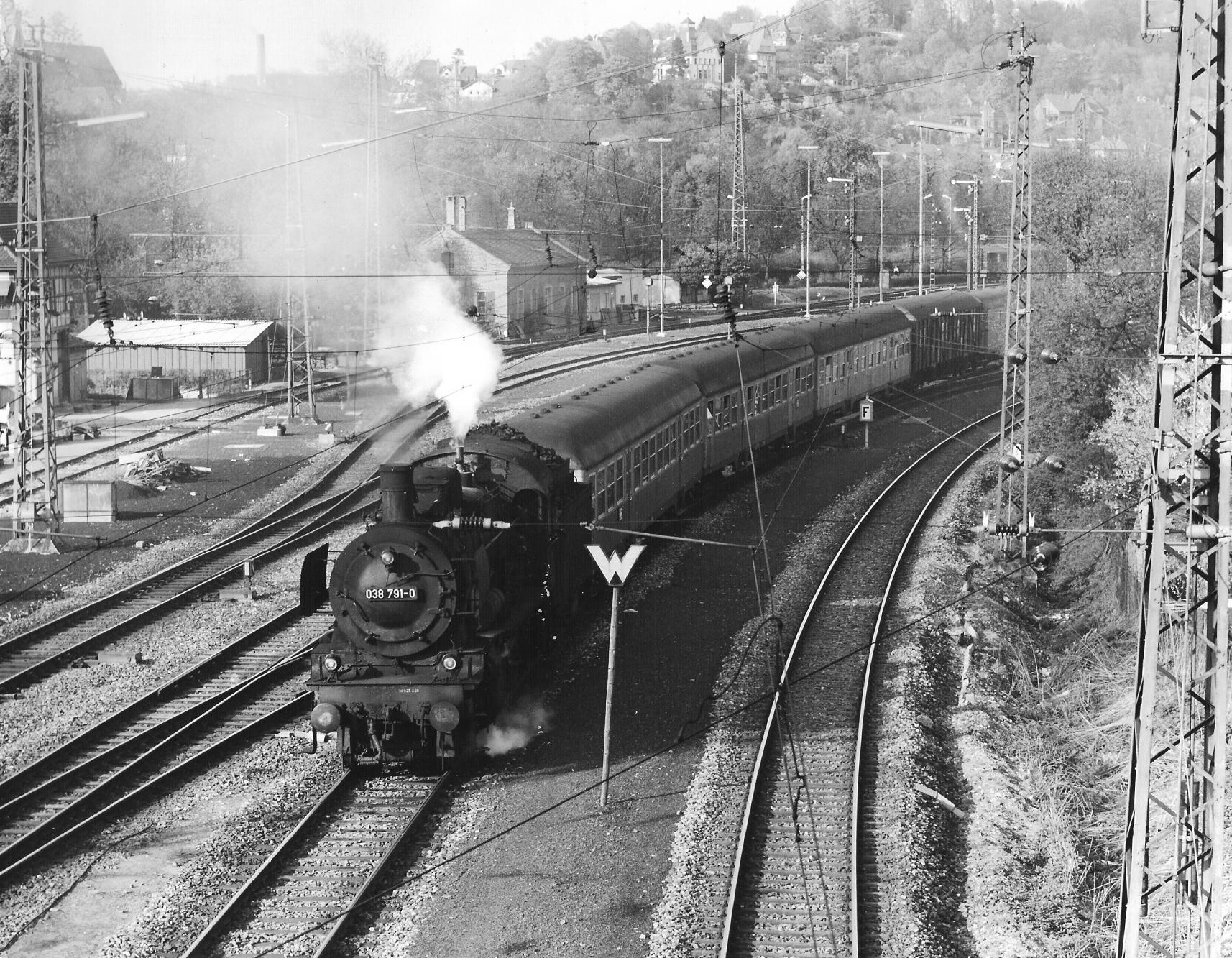
038 791 in Tübingen near the exit to Sigmaringen in May 1970

=== Deutsche Bundesbahn period ===
Until early 1971, Deutsche Bundesbahn passenger services were mainly operated by P 8 steam locomotives based in Tübingen, partly in double traction because of the grades, hauling three and four axle Umbau-Wagens or Silberling carriages, class 64 locomotives were also used. Freight traffic was dominated by class 50 locomotives, which also hauled a few passenger services until 1975. With the end of steam locomotives on the Zollernalb Railway, operations were taken over by class 215 and class 211/212 diesel locomotives and Uerdingen railbuses; locomotive-hauled passenger trains included Silberling carriages or four-axle Umbau-Wagens, which now operated under the brand name of Allgäu-Zollernbahn.

In 1988, the majority of passenger services were changed to operate with class 628.2 diesel multiple units, which were then new. Uerdingen railbus and class 627.0 diesel multiple units were used on individual scheduled services until 1997. Class 215 diesel locomotives were used only for a few passenger services and were becoming less and less used for freight transport. The last scheduled locomotive-hauled service on the line between Tübingen and Sigmaringen operated on 31 May 1997. In subsequent years, however, locomotive-hauled trains were repeatedly used for extended periods as a replacement for tilting trains that could not be operated.

== Current operations ==
=== Passengers ===
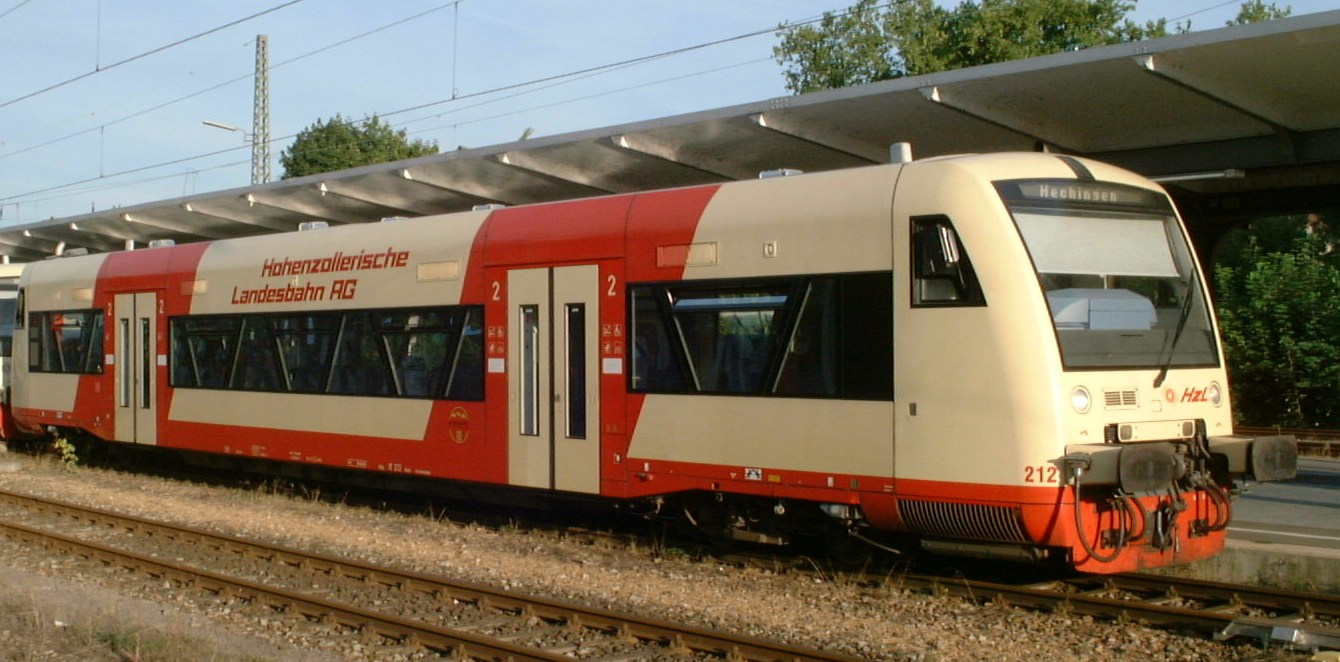
RegioShuttle of the HzL in Tübingen

In the summer of 1997, Hohenzollerischen Landesbahn (HzL) took over the operation of all Regionalbahn (RB) services on the Zollernalb Railway, using Regio Shuttle RS1 diesel railcars. Express services remain the responsibility of Deutsche Bahn and its subsidiary DB ZugBus Regionalverkehr Alb-Bodensee, which uses class 611 tilting trains, operating as Interregio-Express (IRE) services.

Currently three services operate on the Zollernalb Railway at two-hourly intervals during the daytime:

- IRE Stuttgart–Tübingen–Hechingen–Balingen–Albstadt-Ebingen
- RB Tübingen–Hechingen–Balingen–Albstadt-Ebingen–Sigmaringen–Bad Saulgau–Aulendorf
- RB Tübingen–Hechingen–Balingen–Albstadt–Ebingen (Mondays to Fridays only)

The Interregio-Express trains between Tübingen and Albstadt-Ebingen stop only in Mössingen, Hechingen and Balingen. The Regionalbahn services stop at all stations, but some only if required.

Between Tübingen and Albstadt-Ebingen the Regionalbahn services overlap and between Albstadt–Ebingen and Aulendorf Regionalbahn and Interregio-Express services also overlap, giving an approximate hourly service, so that from Monday to Friday all places except Strassberg-Winterlingen and Storzingen are served at least hourly. Extra trains run especially in the peak hours, for school traffic and on Sunday evening, some of which operate on only part of the line. In the early morning and late evening there are also deviations from the basic operating pattern.

=== Freight ===
Freight traffic was operated up to 31 December 2001 by the former Deutsche Bahn subsidiary, DB Cargo, hauled by class 294 and 365 locomotives. Under the MORA C concept all freight operations on the line would have been abandoned in 2001, but this was averted as the result of an agreement between DB Cargo and the Hohenzollerischen Landesbahn (HzL). On 2 January 2002, HzL took over wagonload traffic on the Zollernalb line and other lines in the region.

== Planning ==
For several years, there have been proposals to integrate the Tübingen–Albstadt-Ebingen section of the line (in association with the reactivation of the Talgang Railway—Talgangbahn—to Onstmettingen) in the proposed Regionalstadtbahn Neckar-Alb on the Karlsruhe model.
