= Veringenstadt =

Town in Sigmaringen, Germany

- Town
- Coat of arms

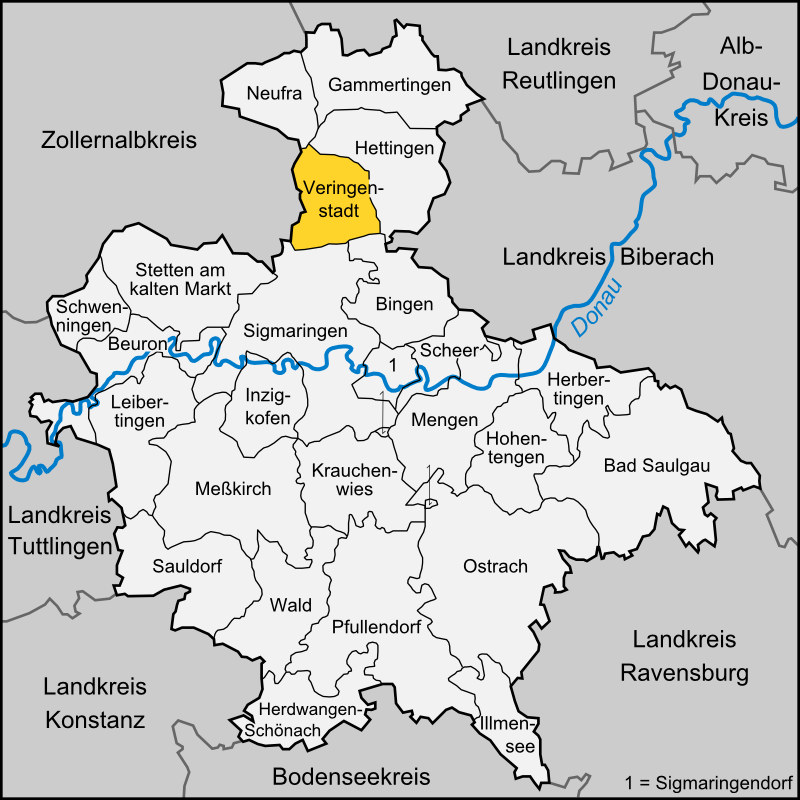
- Location of Veringenstadt within Sigmaringen district
- Interactive map of Veringenstadt
- Location within Germany Location within Baden-Württemberg
- Coordinates: 48°10′42″N 9°12′43″E
- Country: Germany
- State: Baden-Württemberg
- Admin. region: Tübingen
- District: Sigmaringen

Government
  - Mayor (2022–30): Maik Rautenberg

Area
  - Total: 31.25 km^{2} (12.07 sq mi)
- Elevation: 631 m (2,070 ft)

Population (2025-12-31)
  - Total: 2,147
  - Density: 68.70/km^{2} (177.9/sq mi)
- Time zone: UTC+01:00 (CET)
  - Summer (DST): UTC+02:00 (CEST)
- Postal codes: 72519
- Dialling codes: 07577
- Vehicle registration: SIG
- Website: www.veringenstadt.de

Veringenstadt (German pronunciation: [ˈfeːʁɪŋənʃtat]; Swabian: Verenga) is a town in the district of Sigmaringen, in Baden-Württemberg, Germany. It is situated 10 km north of Sigmaringen.

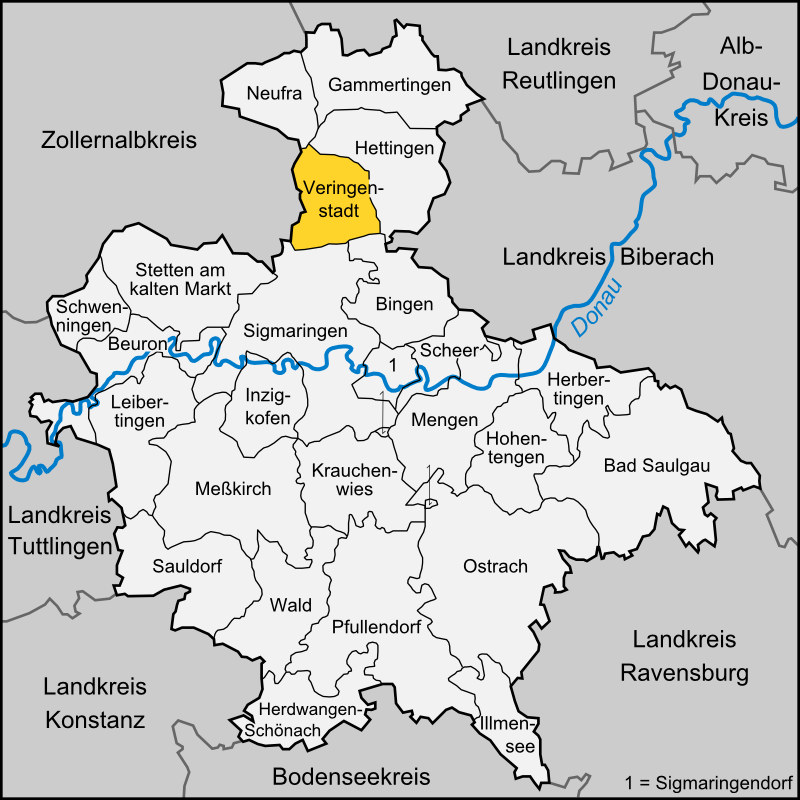
Map Sigmaringen district

== Geographical location ==
Veringenstadt is situated in the valley of the Lauchert, a tributary of the Danube, between Gammertingen and Sigmaringen. The municipality area is 3125 hectares.

== Geology ==
The municipality Veringenstadt lies on the Lauchertgraben (Lauchert trench). East of Veringendorf a petrified sponge reef can be seen, which was created 140 million years ago.

== History ==
The first mention of Veringenstadt is around the year 786. It derives its name from a certain "Fara" or "Faro", was so well earlier "Faringa", about 1130 Veringin, later always Veringen.

The counts of Veringen were one of the wealthiest and most respected dynasties of the 11th and 12th century in southern Germany although they became extinct in 1415. Through targeted resettlement of population from the surrounding hamlets succeeded about 1250 the foundation of the city of Veringen (today Veringenstadt). After the Thirty Years' War (1618–1648) about 1650 farmers from Tirol were recruited for Veringenstadt and settled here. From 1827 to 1925 Veringenstadt belonged to Oberamt Gammertingen. 1850 it became as part of the principality Hohenzollern-Sigmaringen prussian, and belonged to the province of Hohenzollern. Ore was mined in the 18th and 19th century. Since 1927 the municipality belongs to the district of Sigmaringen. Since 1945, the city belonged to Württemberg-Hohenzollern, which opened in Baden-Württemberg in 1952. By the inclusion of expellees after 1945, the population of Veringenstadt has nearly doubled in the 1950s. On February 1, 1972 Hermentingen was incorporated. The incorporation of Veringendorf was on January 1, 1975.

== Municipality ==
The municipality combines the main locality Veringenstadt with the two villages Hermentingen and Veringendorf.

Coat of arms	Villages	Inhabitants (15 January 2011)	Area
Veringenstadt	Veringenstadt (main locality)	1611	1523 ha
Hermentingen	Hermentingen	147	488 ha
Veringendorf	Veringendorf	504	1052 ha

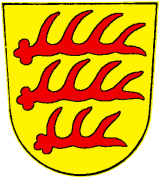
The arms of the Counts of Veringen (extinct 1415)

== Crest ==
The emblem of Veringenstadt was officially approved 1947. Already 1320 a lion and a deer rod was used as coat of arms. The coat of arms shows a golden shield a red lion under a layer of a red deer rack. The lion comes from the Habsburg coat of arms, the deer bar is derived from the coat of arms of the Counts of Veringen.

== Twinning ==
Veringenstadt maintains since 2012 a partnership with the city of Zwettl an der Rodl in Austria.

== Points of interest ==
=== Museums ===
- In the city hall from 1415 (the oldest city hall of the Province of Hohenzollern), is located upstairs the local museum.
- Strübhaus - house of painting, built around 1500: Former home and studio of the painter family Strüb " Master of Veringen ". The building at Kirchberg is now a museum of medieval painting.
- In the former mill, which has existed since centuries at this point, a private living museum was created. From around 1250 comes the first written document of a mill in Veringenstadt. By 1924, the waterworks also provided the electricity for Veringenstadt. Now Jutta Schmid-Glöckler has established with her family here.

=== Buildings ===
Veringenstadt is dominated by a medieval core with half-timbered houses, the castle Veringen and religious buildings:

- The Parish Church of St. Nicholas
- The sanctuary of Maria Deutstetten is also a cemetery chapel. The church was inaugurated 1753. On the forecourt of the chapel are several monuments to the victims of war.

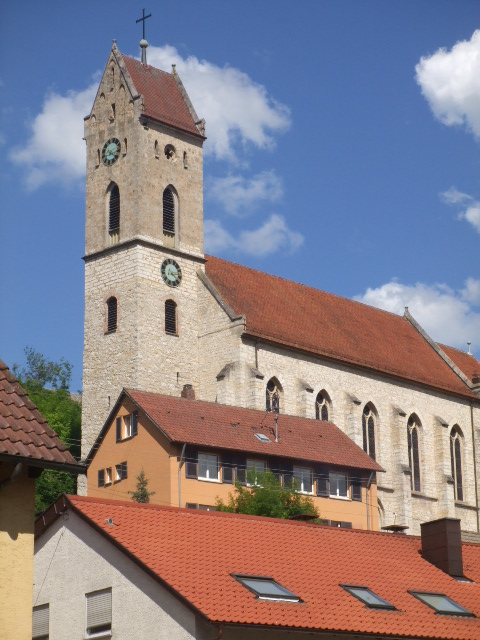
Veringenstadt St Nikolaus

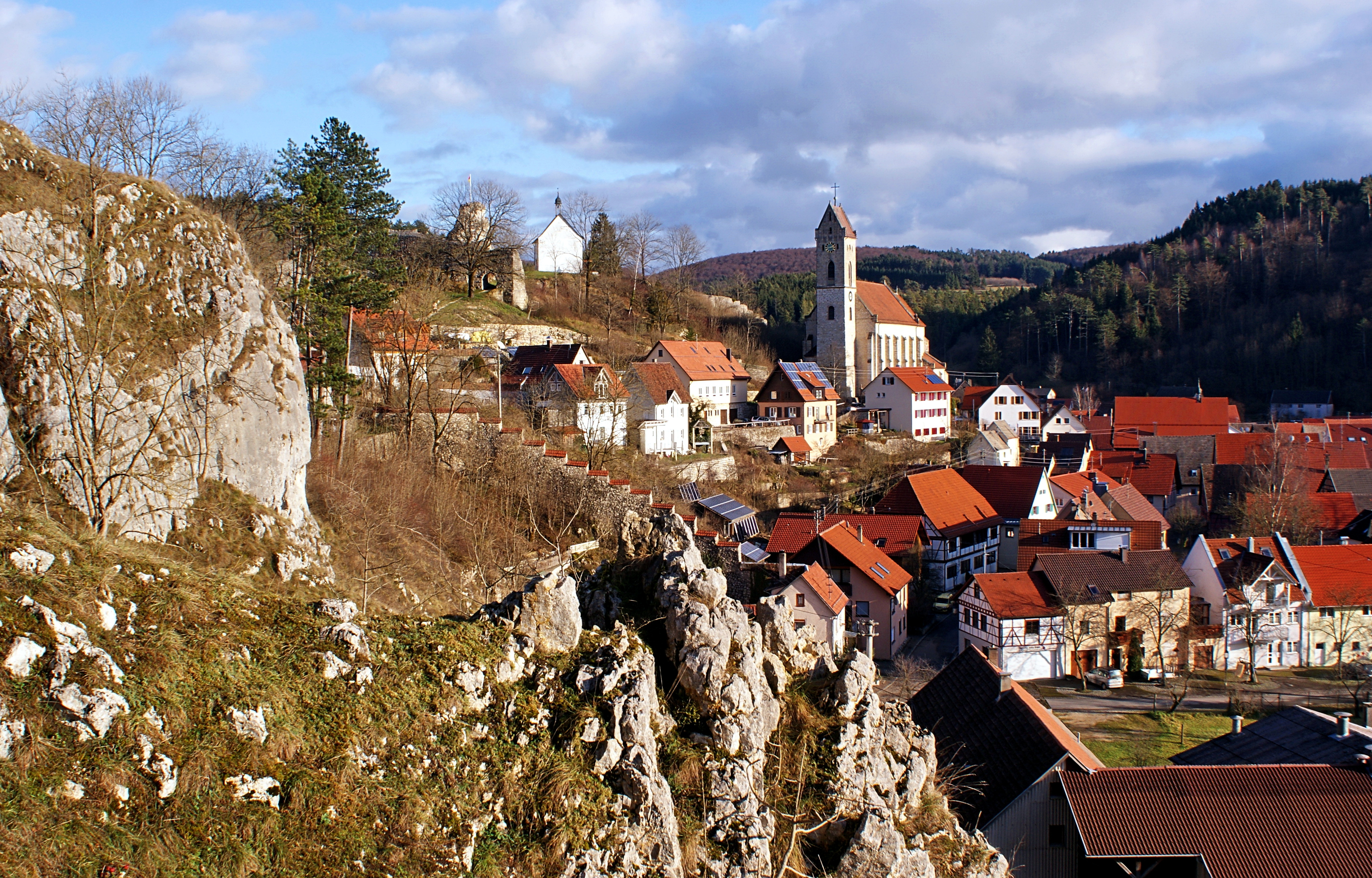
Veringenstadt - Castle and Peter chapell

- The City Council of Veringenstadt was built around 1415 [A 1] and is still the seat of city government. It is the oldest town hall of Hohenzollern in continuous municipal use.
- The freely accessible ruins Veringen were probably a creation of Count Marquard of Veringen around the year 1100/30. She was owned by the Counts of Veringen, the House of Württemberg and the Prince of Hohenzollern.
- Besides the ruins there is the Peter chapel from the 10th or 11th century with frescoes from 1515 by Peter Strüb the younger from Veringenstadt.
- Neanderthal sculpture on the lower Lauchertbrücke, created in 1965 by Eduard Raach-Döttinger.
- The Church of St. Gallus in the district Hermentingen dates from the 14th century. It was rebuilt in the 17th century.
- The Church of St. Michael in the district Veringendorf is the oldest church of Hohenzollern.

Electrical works (Brothers Haux 1902) in Veringendorf

- The waterworks Hermentingen prepares the water of the Gallus source, the largest karst spring of Hohenzollern, to drinking water.
- Childhood home of cardinal Karl Lehmann.

== Teams ==
In Veringenstadt, there are more than 30 clubs. With currently 450 members, the TSV is the largest. (as of 15 January 2011).

== Economy and Infrastructure ==
=== Transportation ===
The municipalities Veringenstadt and Veringendorf were connected to the rail network by the Kleinengstingen-Sigmaringen railway. The Göpfelstein was tunneled at Veringenstadt. The 91-meter long tunnel was built by Italian workers. The first train passed through the tunnel Veringen at Christmas, 1907, the line was opened in 1908. The Federal Highway 32 led originally through the Veringenstadt center. Between 1975 and 1980, a road tunnel was built. Today daily drive around 5000 vehicles through the Schlossberg tunnel. The Public transport is guaranteed by the Verkehrsverbund Neckar-Alb-Donau (NALDO). The community is located in the comb 442.

=== Established businesses ===
The Schwörer Haus maintains in Veringenstadt a factory making fort massif houses, ceilings, precast concrete, chimneys.

== Education ==
There are two schools in the nucleus. A primary school and since the school year 2010/2011 a branch of the Werkrealschule Gammertingen. The school building of the Alb-Lauchert School in Veringenstadt, an elementary school, was built in 1953. In Veringenstadt there is a day care center with full-day care, in Veringendorf a kindergarten, which also accommodates children under three years.

== Freemen ==
- Adolf Rosch (1869–1962), theologian and a doctorate in law, studied in Freiburg and Eichstätt, was appointed in 1932 vicar general in the diocese of Freiburg, previously Member of Parliament. On January 2, 1933 he became a freeman [35] biography, list of publications and references to Person
- Ildefons Deigendesch (1880–1953), born in Veringenstadt, a missionary of the Abbey St. Andrè in Belgium, in 1932 appointed to vicar general of Rio Branco Brazil. He became a freeman on January 2, 1933,
- Stefan Fink (1908-2000), mayor from 1945 to 1966 and entrepreneur, holder of the Federal Cross of Merit.

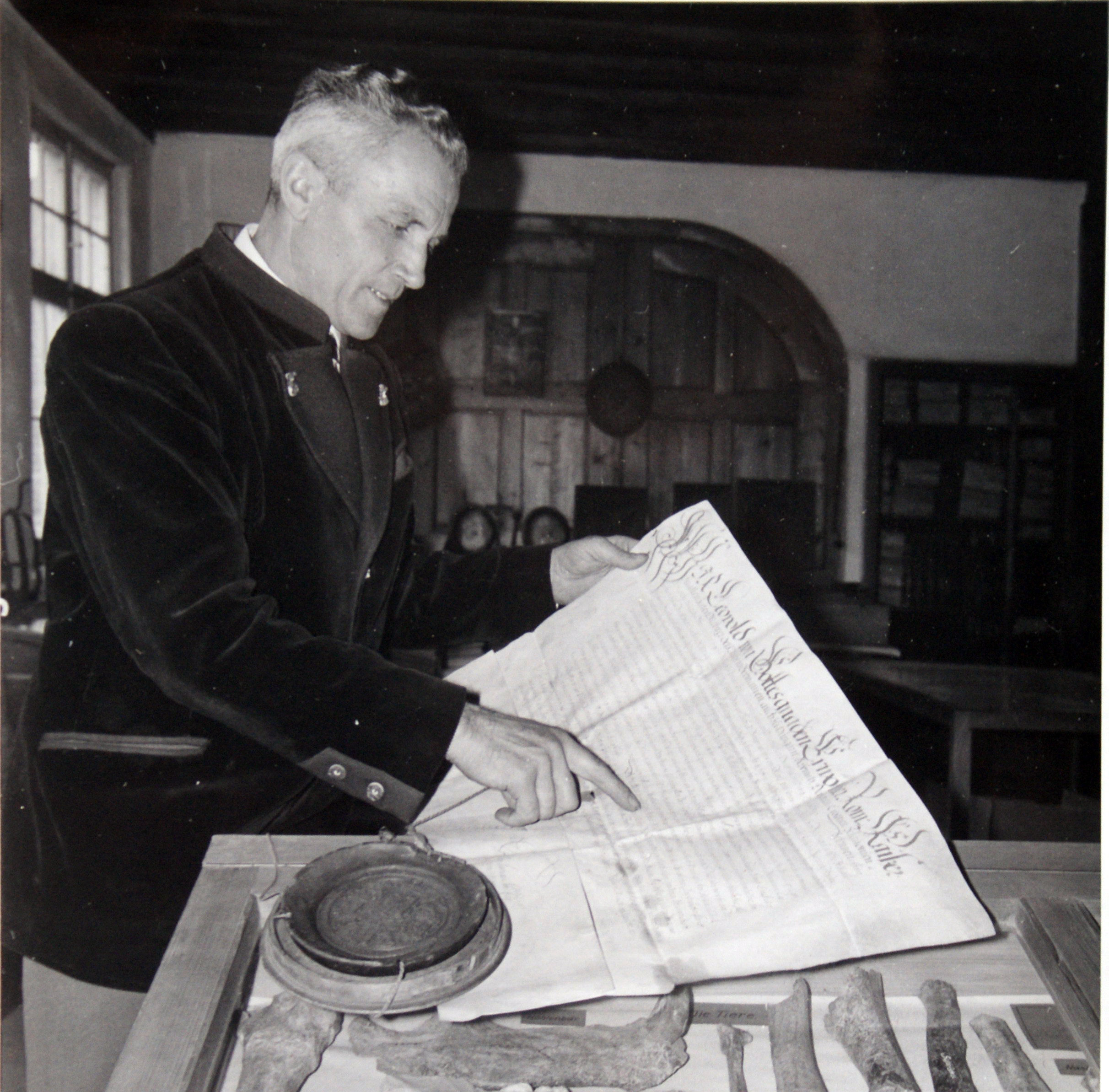
1962 Stefan Fink Mayor of Veringenstadt

- Herbert Krapf, (born 1941), former mayor
- Erwin Zillenbiller (born 1925), honorary professor at the University of Stuttgart in the Faculty of Architecture and Urban Planning with doctorate, author and head of Strübhaus, holder of the Federal Cross of Merit and the Medal of Merit of the State of Baden-Württemberg

== Sons and daughters of the city ==
- Simon Grynaeus (1493–1541), a German scholar and theologian of the Protestant Reformation.
- Egid Hochstein (1720–1769), painter and sculptor. In 1754, after his apprenticeship, he founded a workshop in Veringenstadt
- Nikolaus Allgaier (1800–1880) lithographer. In Veringenstadt he founded the "Lithographic Institute Nikolaus Allgaier". Originally also from Veringenstadt Lithograph Alfred Dobler (1799–1879) joined with Nicholas Allgaier together.
- Franz Saurer (1806–1882), entrepreneur, born in Veringendorf
- Karl Lehmann (1936–2018), a German Cardinal prelate of the Catholic Church, Bishop of Mainz from 1983 to 2016, brought up in Veringenstadt

== Literature ==
- Walther Genzmer, ed. (1948), Die Kunstdenkmäler Hohenzollerns (in German), vol. Band 2, Kreis Sigmaringen, Stuttgart: W. Speemann
- Franz Gluitz (1985), Dorf und Stadt Veringen. Ein kunstgeschichtlicher Rundgang (in German) (2., überarbeitete ed.), o.O.
- Erwin Zillenbiller (1964), Stadt Veringen (in German), Gammertingen: Sebastian Acker
