= Jungnau =

Village in Sigmaringen, Baden-Württemberg, Germany

Coordinates: 48°8′24″N 9°12′34″E

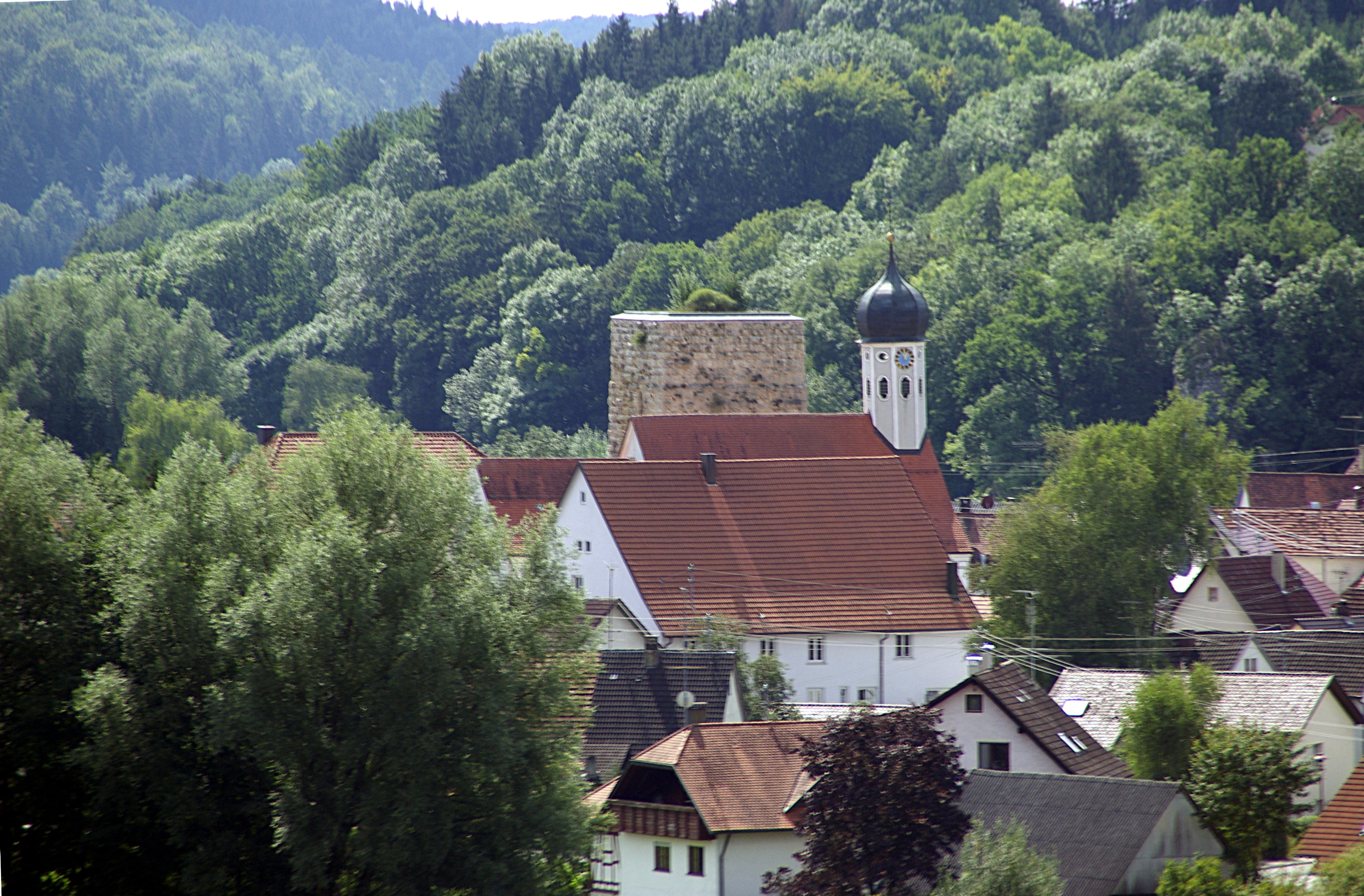
Jungnau

Jungnau is a village in the district of Sigmaringen in Baden-Württemberg in Germany. It is part of the City Sigmaringen.
