= Sophie Stehle =

German operatic soprano

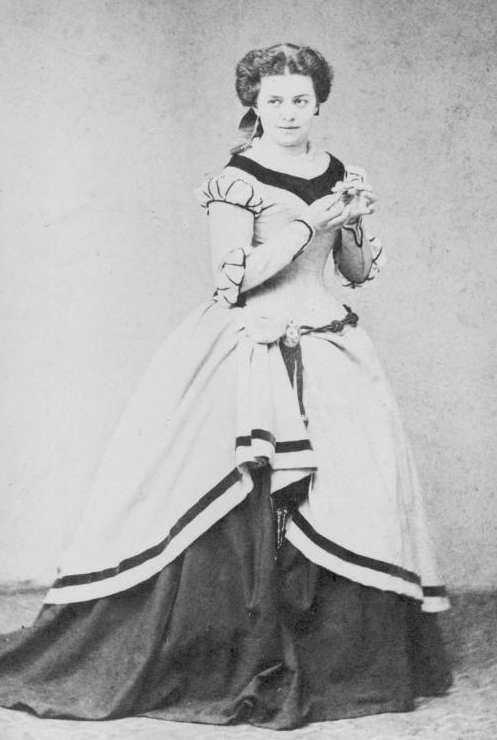
Sophie Stehle as Marguerite in Faust

Sophie Stehle (15 May 1838 – 4 October 1921) was a German operatic soprano.

She was born in Sigmaringen and was a member of the Bavarian State Opera in Munich from 1860 to 1874. While there, she created the roles of Fricka in Richard Wagner's Das Rheingold on 22 September 1869 and Brünnhilde in Wagner's Die Walküre on 26 June 1870. She retired from the stage after marrying Baron Wilhelm von Knigge in 1874.
