= Mengen, Germany =

Mengen
- Town
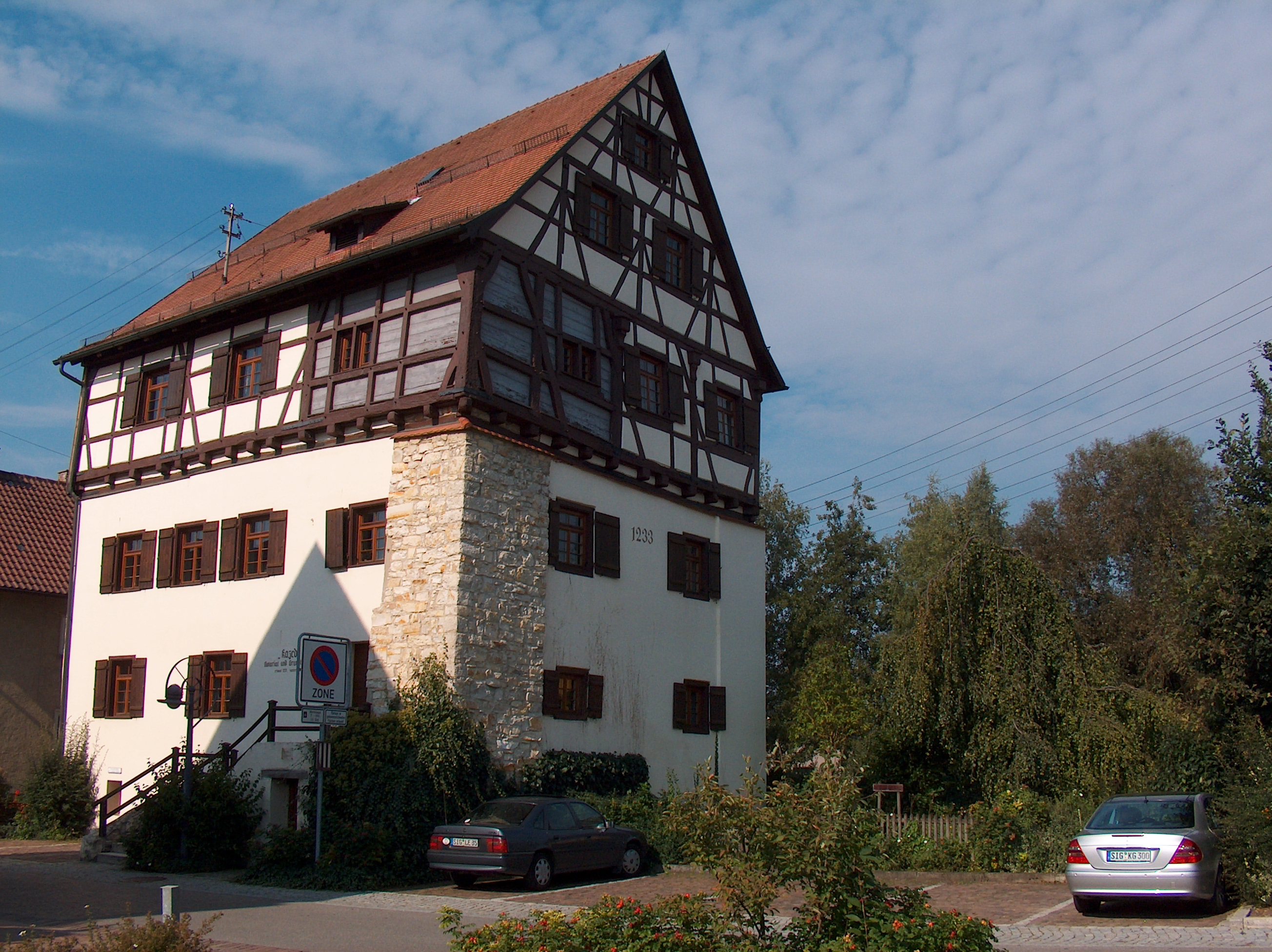
- The oldest building in Mengen, from 1233

- Coat of arms

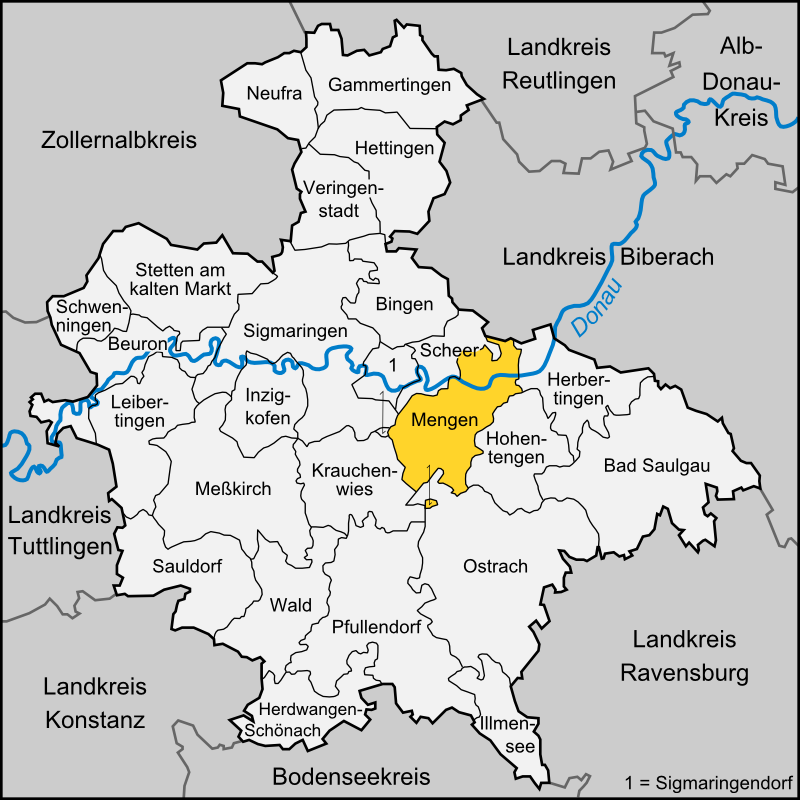
- Location of Mengen within Sigmaringen district
- Interactive map of Mengen
- Location within Germany Location within Baden-Württemberg
- Coordinates: 48°2′59″N 9°19′48″E
- Country: Germany
- State: Baden-Württemberg
- Admin. region: Tübingen
- District: Sigmaringen
- Subdivisions: 5

Government
  - Mayor (2016–24): Stefan Bubeck (CDU)

Area
  - Total: 49.82 km^{2} (19.24 sq mi)
- Elevation: 561 m (1,841 ft)

Population (2025-12-31)
  - Total: 10,114
  - Density: 203.0/km^{2} (525.8/sq mi)
- Time zone: UTC+01:00 (CET)
  - Summer (DST): UTC+02:00 (CEST)
- Postal codes: 88508–88512
- Dialling codes: 07572
- Vehicle registration: SIG, SLG, STO, ÜB
- Website: www.mengen.de

Mengen (German pronunciation: [ˈmɛŋən]) is a town in the district of Sigmaringen, in Baden-Württemberg, Germany. It is situated 9 km southeast of Sigmaringen.

== History ==
The area has been inhabited since prehistoric and early historical times. Two late Bronze Age graves were found in Mengen, both including many metal artifacts. It was around the first Century after Christ Birth, when Romans built a castle on the hills in Ennetach. By this, the Romans strengthened their influence along the Danube River, before they were later driven out by the invading Alemanni. These settled in the area and founded many places with the endings "-ingen", which is thought to be the origins for the city Name of "Me-ingen (now Mengen).

In 1876 it was found on the site of a former Roman villa rustica, so far the only colour mosaic of the Roman period preserved in Upper Swabia. It shows in a medallion the head of Medusa (known as "Medusa of Mengen") and legendary figure remains plait, to which was joined by other original medallions. The remaining parts of the mosaic floor are not preserved. Since the Second World War they have been lost. After the discovery in 2002 in the Landesmuseum Württemberg, it has been restored and has been on display in the Roman Museum Mengen-Ennetach (which closed in 2015).

Was first mentioned in a document the area, bequeathed as Emperor Louis the Pious in 819 areas of the Ablach to the monastery Buchau. 1170 is held Frederick I Barbarossa on in the city and held a court day. 1257 is documented for the first time a free Mengen ("Vrie Mengen"). The new Mengen (where it is today), built around 1150–1250, was created next to the old settlement Mengen (today Ennetach). The old and the new Mengen were separated by the river Ablach, therefore, in order to distinguish between the two places, the old Mengen "beyond the river" is called Ennet Aach.

On 4 March 1276 Mengen acquired the municipal law, issued in Augsburg by King Rudolf von Habsburg.

Mengen was 1276 to 1805 as one of the so-called five Danube cities Vorderösterreich (together with Ehingen, Munderkingen, Riedlingen and Bad Saulgau). In 1806, Mengen fell by Napoleon and the Peace of Pressburg to the Kingdom of Württemberg.

On 18 May 1632, during the Thirty Years' War, Mengen was hard pressed by Swedish troops, but was not taken. The inhabitants had intensively called the Mother of God, to stand next to them and therefore wrote this also the salvation of the city from the attacking soldiers, which is why the May Day is celebrated annually in Mengen today. [4] In 1774 there were in total 23 restaurants in Mengen, of which 21 were brewing their own beer. [5] On 7 October 1819 there was a fire in Mengen old town, the "Great Fire of Mengen", which was fought by comparatively simple means, and many buildings were destroyed.

Between 1870 and 1872 Mengen was connected to the Württemberg and Baden railway network. In 1895/1896 it was thanks to an own investment in the city's first electricity, Mengen received in 1900 flowing water.

On the airfield of Mengen-Hohentengen the Dornier Do 335, one of the fastest fighter of World War II, was tested.

== Transport ==
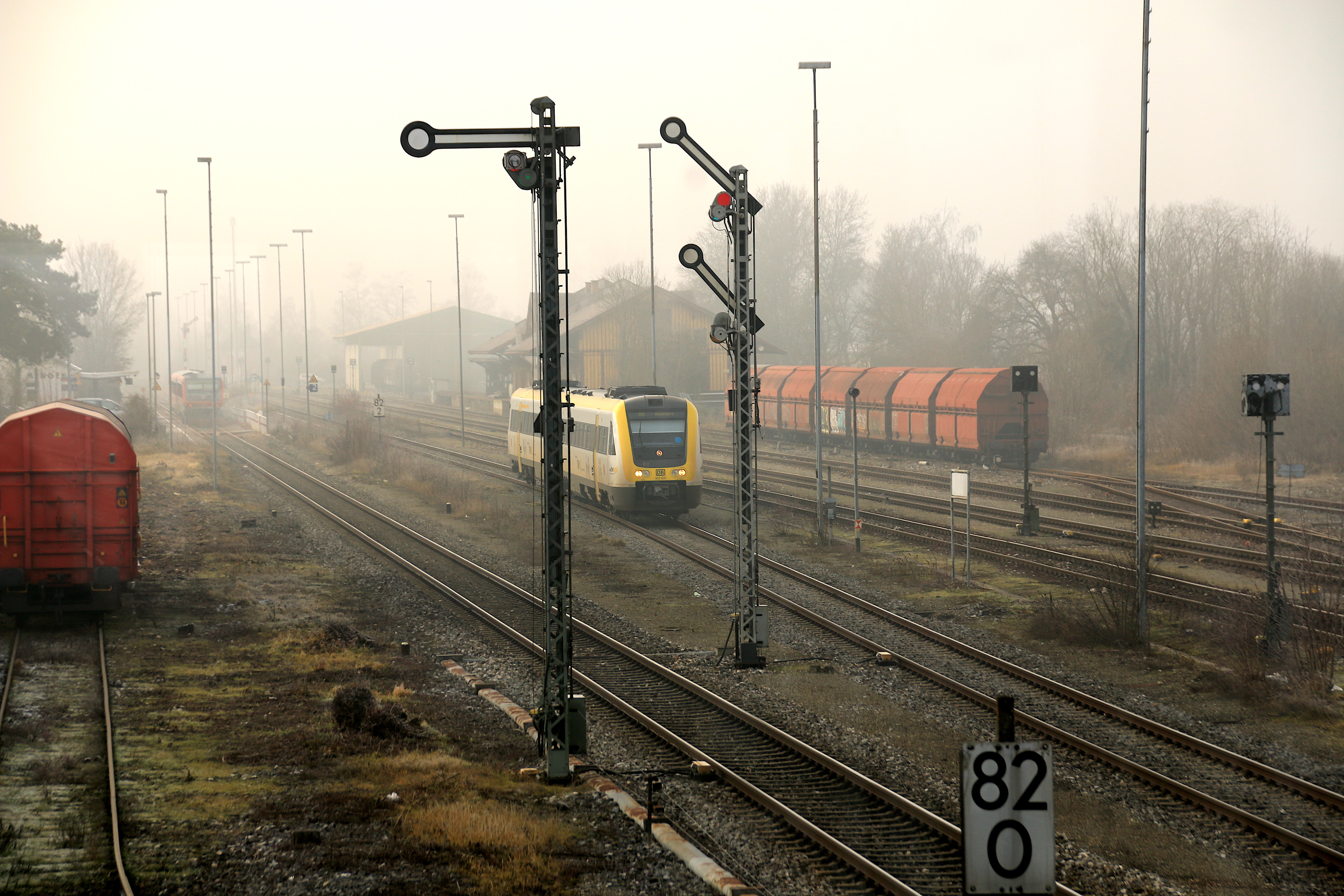
Mengen railway station: a train departs towards Herbertingen

There is a regular train service between Ulm and Donaueschingen via Sigmaringen.
