= John Henes Sr. =

Inventor, businessman, and philanthropist

John Henes Sr. (born Johan Baptist Henes; January 6, 1852 – January 15, 1923) was an inventor, businessman, and philanthropist in Menominee, Michigan.

Henes was born in Gammertingen, Kingdom of Württemberg, Germany, the son of Eusebius and Ursula (Goeggel) Henes. He emigrated to the United States in 1871 and lived in Seymour, Wisconsin, and Milwaukee before settling in Menominee, where he became a brewmaster at a brewery operated by Adam Gauch. He married Rosa Leisen (1858–1923) in 1879 and, together with his father-in-law Jacob Leisen, he purchased the brewery and operated it under the name Leisen & Henes Brewing Company.

Henes patented the Henes-Keller bottling machine in 1897, and it became the leading bottling machine in the beer industry after it was introduced in 1903. The device transferred beer from barrels to bottles without loss of carbonation, and it featured a revolving filler and air pump. Henes served as president of the Henes & Keller Company, which manufactured the bottle-filling machines, and the equipment was marketed globally. An improvement of the machine was later patented by his son, John E. Henes (1881–1948), who managed the company after his father's death. The plant, which stood at 14th Avenue and 6th Street in Menominee, was sold to the L. E. Jones company in the early 1940s.

In addition to his brewing activity, Henes was vice-president of the First National Bank, the Menominee River Sugar Company, and the Richardson Shoe Company. He was also director of the Lloyd Manufacturing Company, which produced wooden ware.

== Legacy ==
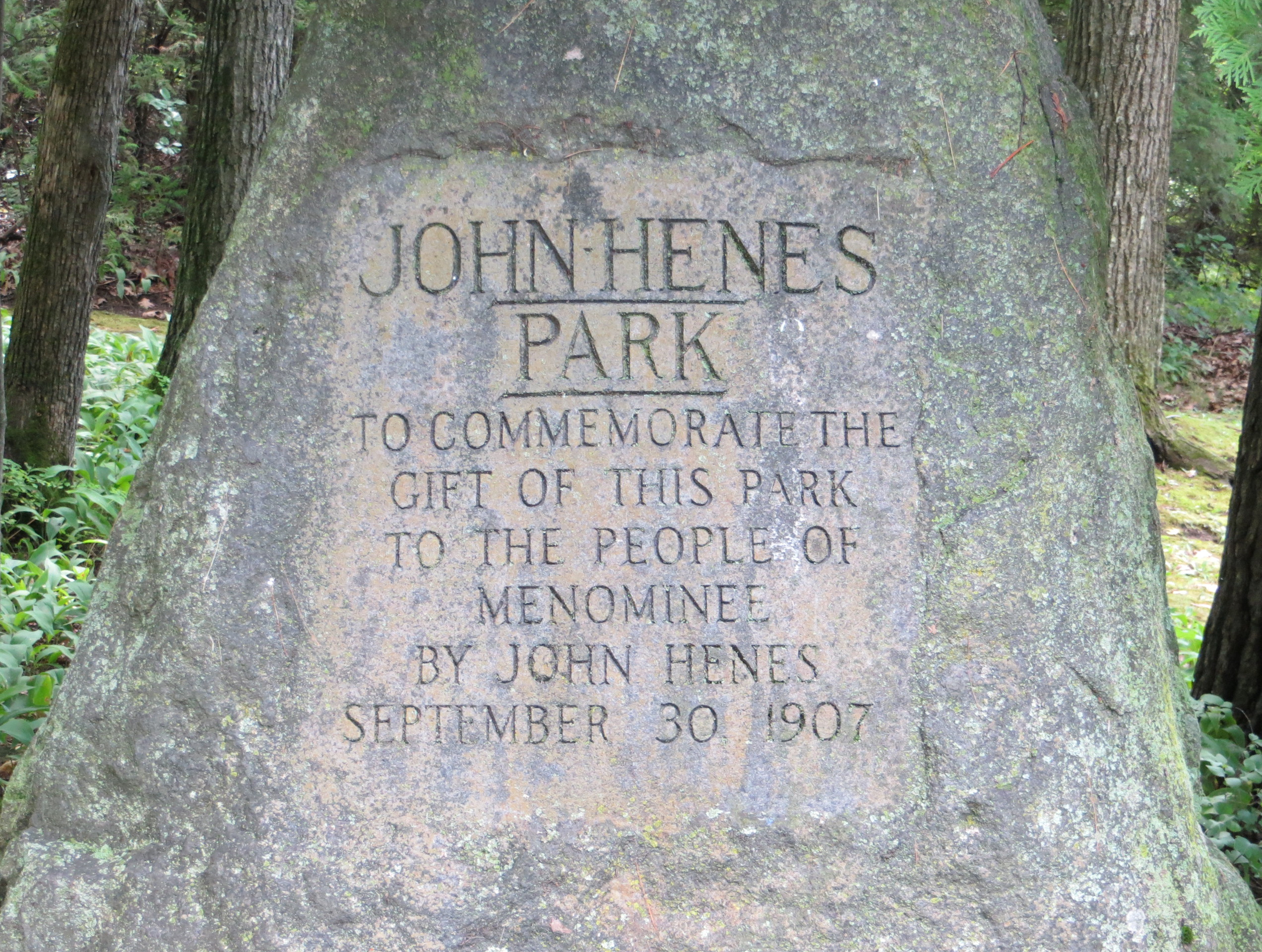
Inscription commemorating John Henes's donation of land for John Henes Park

John Henes Park in Menominee is named after Henes, who donated the land for the 50-acre (20 ha) park in 1907.
