= Hettingen =

- Town
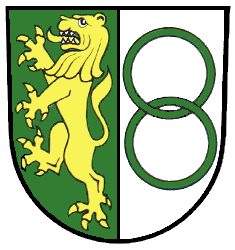
- Coat of arms

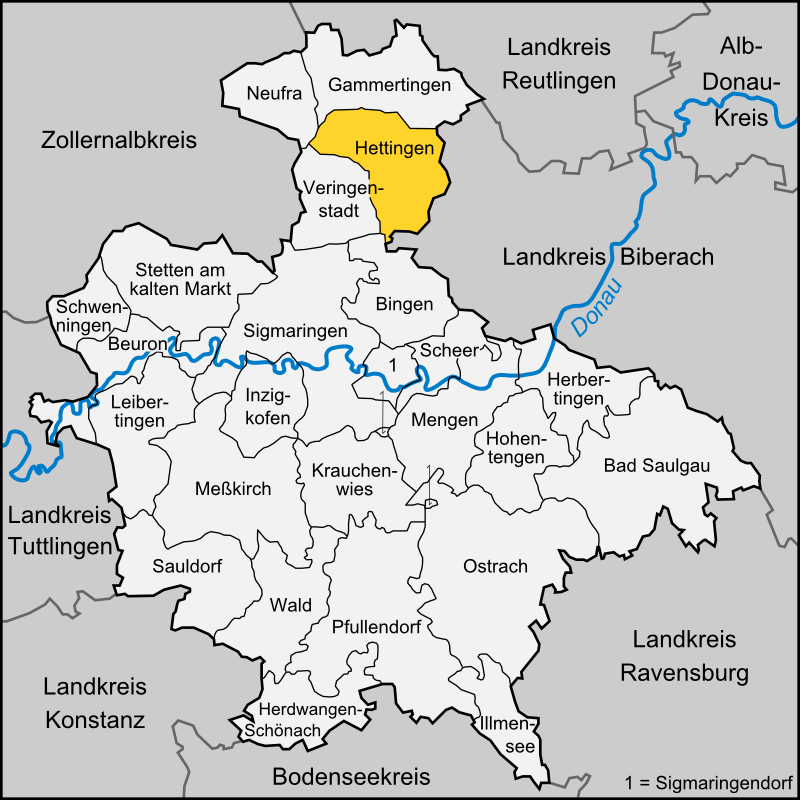
- Location of Hettingen within Sigmaringen district
- Interactive map of Hettingen
- Location within Germany Location within Baden-Württemberg
- Coordinates: 48°12′58″N 9°13′53″E
- Country: Germany
- State: Baden-Württemberg
- Admin. region: Tübingen
- District: Sigmaringen
- Subdivisions: 2

Government
  - Mayor (2024–32): Daniel Eiffler

Area
  - Total: 46.06 km^{2} (17.78 sq mi)
- Elevation: 644 m (2,113 ft)

Population (2025-12-31)
  - Total: 1,864
  - Density: 40.47/km^{2} (104.8/sq mi)
- Time zone: UTC+01:00 (CET)
  - Summer (DST): UTC+02:00 (CEST)
- Postal codes: 72513
- Dialling codes: 07574
- Vehicle registration: SIG
- Website: www.hettingen.de

Hettingen (German pronunciation: [ˈhɛtɪŋən]) is a town in the district of Sigmaringen, in Baden-Württemberg, Germany. It is situated 14 km north of Sigmaringen. Hettingen absorbed the formerly independent municipality Inneringen in 1975.

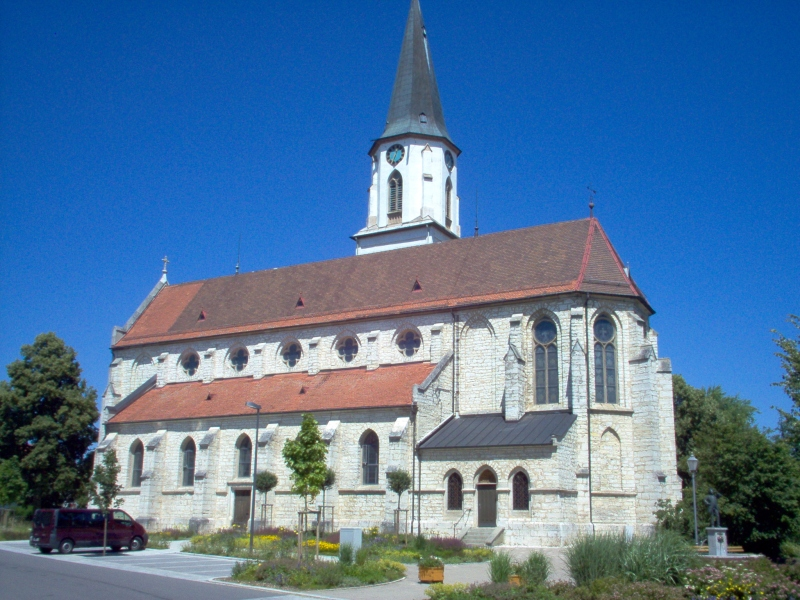
Church St. Martin Inneringen

== Mayors ==
Uwe Bühler was elected mayor in October 2008. Bühler died in 2011 at the age of 50 from cancer, In February 2012 Dagmar Kuster was elected mayor.

Mayor of Hettingen

- till 1974: Johann Knaus (CDU)

Mayors of Inneringen

- 1905–1933: Josef Kempf
- 1933–1945: Wilhelm Fritz
- 1945–1948: Johann Georg Ott
- 1949–1974: Johann Georg Brandstetter

Mayors of Hettingen after merger with Inneringen

- 1975–1999: Johannes Müller (CDU)
- 1999–2008: Stefan Bubeck (CDU)
- 2008–2011: Uwe Bühler (CDU)
- 2012–2024: Dagmar Kuster
- since 2024: Daniel Eiffler
