= Scheer, Germany =

Scheer
- Town
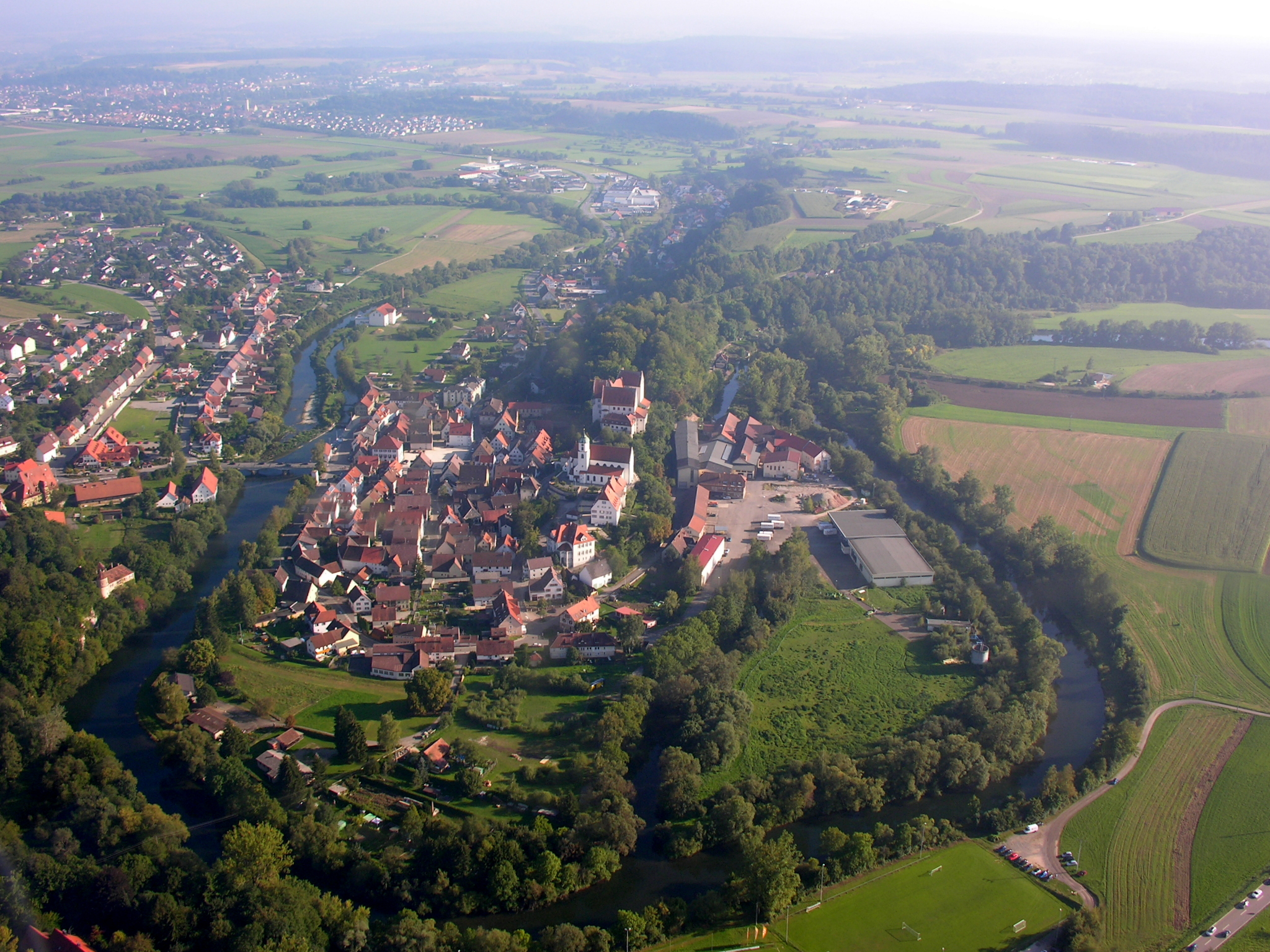
- Aerial view

- Coat of arms

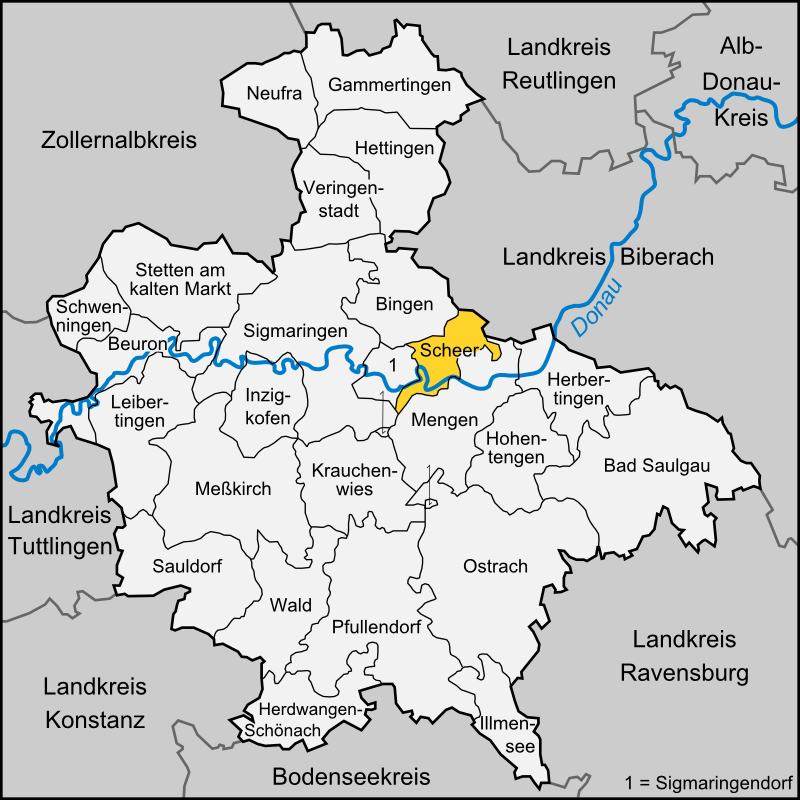
- Location of Scheer within Sigmaringen district
- Interactive map of Scheer
- Location within Germany Location within Baden-Württemberg
- Coordinates: 48°4′25″N 9°17′36″E
- Country: Germany
- State: Baden-Württemberg
- Admin. region: Tübingen
- District: Sigmaringen

Government
  - Mayor (2024–32): Lothar Fischer

Area
  - Total: 18.72 km^{2} (7.23 sq mi)
- Elevation: 577 m (1,893 ft)

Population (2025-12-31)
  - Total: 2,456
  - Density: 131.2/km^{2} (339.8/sq mi)
- Time zone: UTC+01:00 (CET)
  - Summer (DST): UTC+02:00 (CEST)
- Postal codes: 72516
- Dialling codes: 07572
- Vehicle registration: SIG
- Website: www.stadtscheer.de

Scheer (German pronunciation: [ʃeːɐ̯]; Swabian: Schär) is a town in the district of Sigmaringen, in Baden-Württemberg, Germany. It is situated on the Danube, 6 km east of Sigmaringen.
