= Neufra =

- Municipality
- Coat of arms

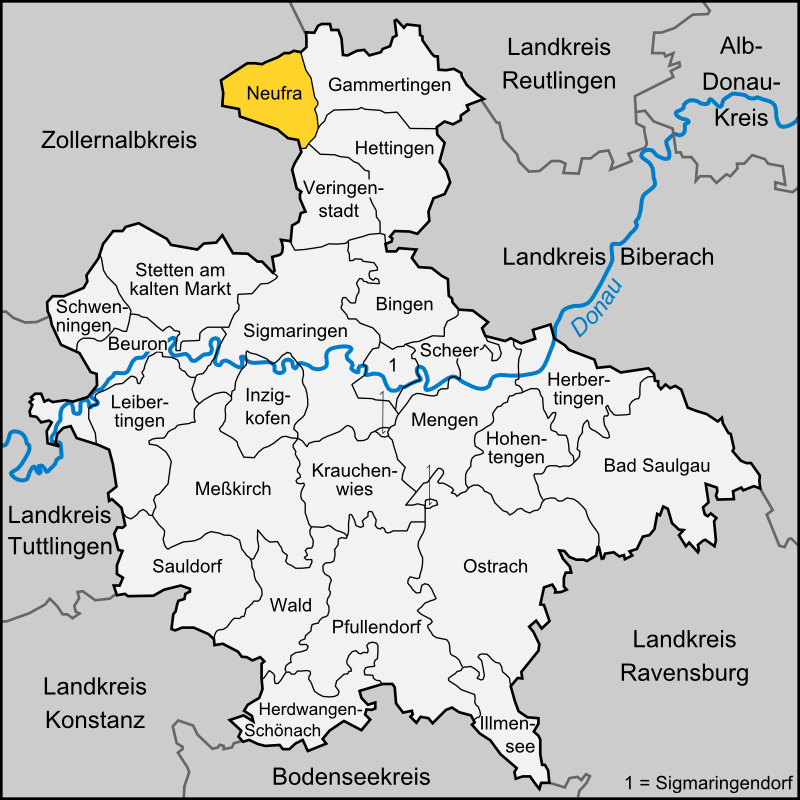
- Location of Neufra within Sigmaringen district
- Interactive map of Neufra
- Location within Germany Location within Baden-Württemberg
- Coordinates: 48°14′48″N 9°10′58″E
- Country: Germany
- State: Baden-Württemberg
- Admin. region: Tübingen
- District: Sigmaringen
- Subdivisions: 2

Government
  - Mayor (2022–30): Reinhard Traub

Area
  - Total: 28.39 km^{2} (10.96 sq mi)
- Elevation: 680 m (2,230 ft)

Population (2025-12-31)
  - Total: 1,849
  - Density: 65.13/km^{2} (168.7/sq mi)
- Time zone: UTC+01:00 (CET)
  - Summer (DST): UTC+02:00 (CEST)
- Postal codes: 72419
- Dialling codes: 07574
- Vehicle registration: SIG
- Website: www.neufra.de

Neufra is a municipality in the district of Sigmaringen in Baden-Württemberg in Germany.

== Geography and location ==
The municipality of Neufra is located in the Fehla River Valley, a tributary of the Lauchert River, which rises in the Swabian Alps.

Neighboring towns and villages include Bitz in the West; Burladingen and Gauselfingen in the northwest; Gammertingen and Bronnen to the north and east; Hettingen in the southeast; Veringenstadt to the south; and Harthausen auf der Scher in the southwest.

== History ==
Evidence of prehistoric settlement abound in Neufra and surrounding environs. Graves and ceramics from Neufra and Freudenweiler date from the Middle Bronze Age (c. 1500 BC) to the Late Bronze Age (c. 1200 BC). Other artifacts have been recovered from Hallstatt Culture sites. In more recent prehistory, Roman finds, dating from the Republic-era (c. 100 BC) were unearthed on the northern slope of Mount Ebinger.

The name "Neufra" probably derives from the Alemannic German "Niwifara" from the 6th or 7th century AD, which can be translated either "new family" or "new ford". In 1138 AD, the area's name was listed as "Nufiron" in the chronicle of Berthold of Zwiefalten.

== Demographics ==
Population development:

Year	Inhabitants
1990	1.881
2001	1.923
2011	1.848
2021	1.828
