= Sigmaringen =

City in Germany

- Town
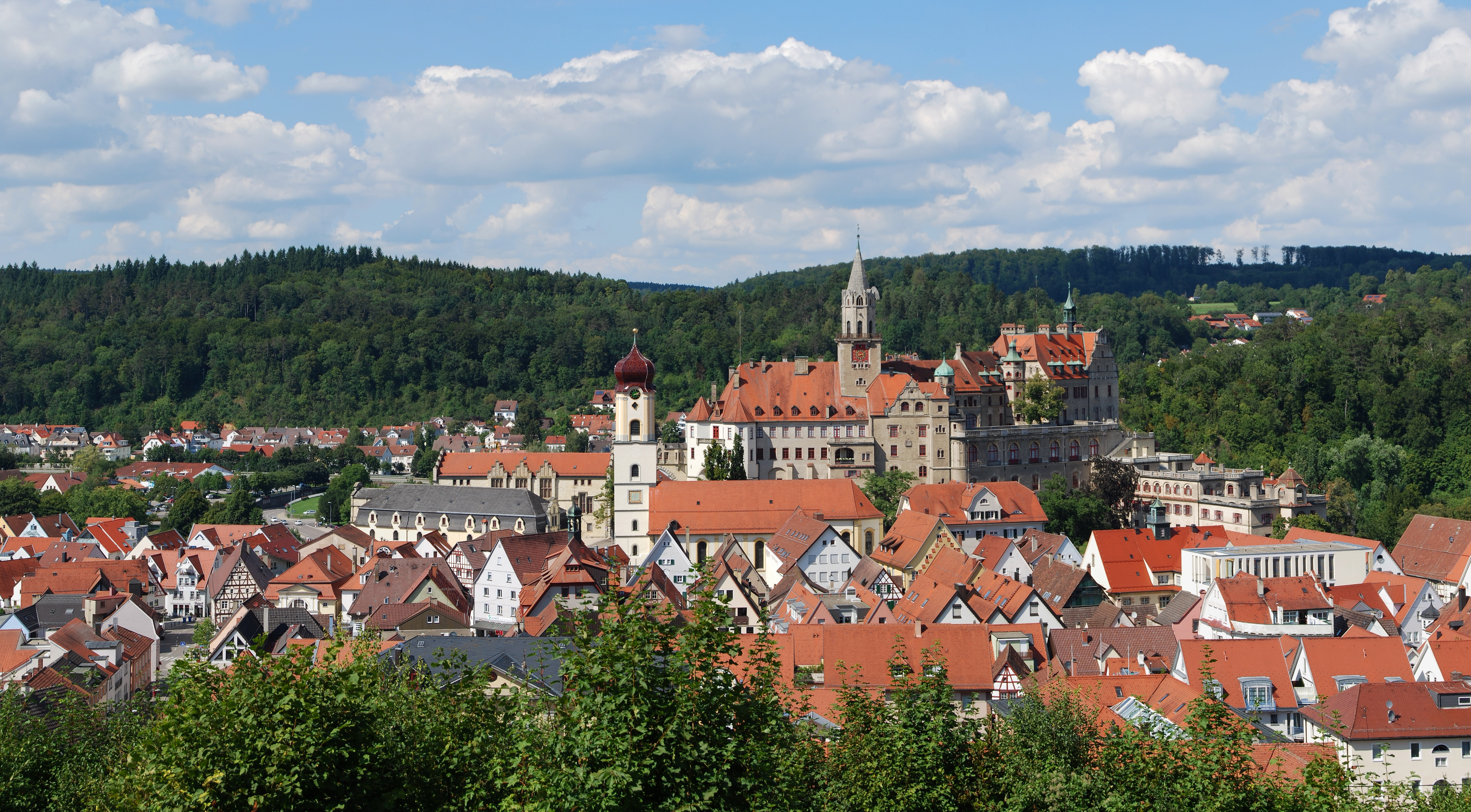

- Coat of arms

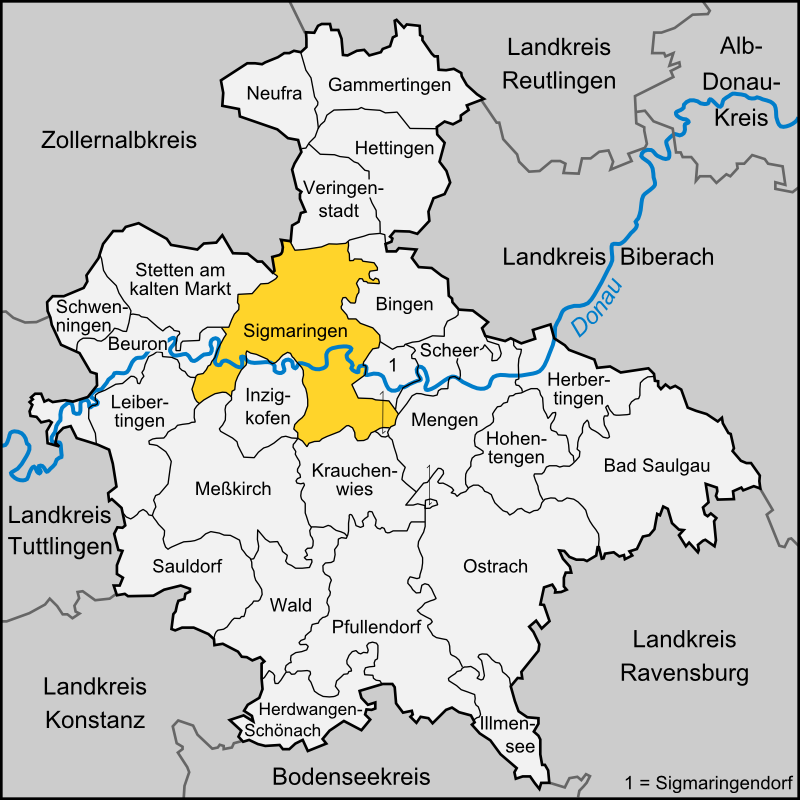
- Location of Sigmaringen within Sigmaringen district
- Interactive map of Sigmaringen
- Location within Germany Location within Baden-Württemberg
- Coordinates: 48°05′13″N 9°13′00″E
- Country: Germany
- State: Baden-Württemberg
- Admin. region: Tübingen
- District: Sigmaringen
- Subdivisions: 6

Government
  - Mayor (2018–26): Marcus Ehm (CDU)

Area
  - Total: 92.84 km^{2} (35.85 sq mi)
- Elevation: 580 m (1,900 ft)

Population (2025-12-31)
  - Total: 16,756
  - Density: 180.5/km^{2} (467.4/sq mi)
- Time zone: UTC+01:00 (CET)
  - Summer (DST): UTC+02:00 (CEST)
- Postal codes: 72488
- Dialling codes: 07571, 07570 (Gutenstein), 07577 (Jungnau)
- Vehicle registration: SIG
- Website: www.sigmaringen.de

Sigmaringen (German pronunciation: [ˈziːkmaʁɪŋən]; Swabian: Semmerenga) is a town in southern Germany, in the state of Baden-Württemberg. Situated on the upper Danube, it is the capital of the Sigmaringen district.

Sigmaringen is renowned for its castle, Schloss Sigmaringen, which was the seat of the principality of Hohenzollern-Sigmaringen until 1850 and is still owned by the Hohenzollern family.

== Geography ==
Surrounded by wooded hills Sigmaringen lies in the Danube valley, south of the Swabian Alps and around 40 km north of Lake Constance.

The surrounding towns are Winterlingen (in the district of Zollernalb) and Veringenstadt in the north, Bingen, Sigmaringendorf, and Scheer in the east, Mengen, Krauchenwies, Inzigkofen, and Meßkirch in the south, and Leibertingen, Beuron, and Stetten am kalten Markt in the west. The town is made up of the following districts: Sigmaringen town center, Gutenstein, Jungnau, Laiz, Oberschmeien, and Unterschmeien.

=== Climate ===
Sigmaringen's climate is classified as humid continental (Köppen: Dfb; Trewartha: Dclo).

Climate data for Sigmaringen (1991-2020)
| Month | Jan | Feb | Mar | Apr | May | Jun | Jul | Aug | Sep | Oct | Nov | Dec | Year |
|---|---|---|---|---|---|---|---|---|---|---|---|---|---|
| Daily mean °C (°F) | −0.7 (30.7) | −0.1 (31.8) | 3.6 (38.5) | 7.7 (45.9) | 12.1 (53.8) | 15.5 (59.9) | 17.3 (63.1) | 16.9 (62.4) | 12.6 (54.7) | 8.2 (46.8) | 3.3 (37.9) | 0.3 (32.5) | 8.1 (46.5) |
| Average precipitation mm (inches) | 49.1 (1.93) | 40.8 (1.61) | 47.0 (1.85) | 52.6 (2.07) | 88.8 (3.50) | 91.6 (3.61) | 99.7 (3.93) | 83.5 (3.29) | 57.5 (2.26) | 56.9 (2.24) | 51.6 (2.03) | 59.6 (2.35) | 778.7 (30.67) |
| Mean monthly sunshine hours | 62.6 | 89.2 | 140.7 | 178.2 | 200.2 | 217.6 | 235.6 | 222 | 165.8 | 112.2 | 66.1 | 53.2 | 1,743.4 |
Source: Deutscher Wetterdienst (Precipitation at Laiz)

== History ==
Sigmaringen was first attested in a document from in 1077 and was part of the principality of Hohenzollern-Sigmaringen from 1576 until 1850, after which it became the Prussian Province of Hohenzollern.

=== Middle Ages ===
In the 11th century, in the end of the Early Middle Ages, the first castle was built on the rock that protected the valley. The first written reference dates from 1077, when King Rudolf of Rheinfelden tried in vain to conquer Sigmaringen Castle. The city was officially founded in 1250. In 1325, it was sold to Ulrich III, Count of Württemberg. In 1460 and 1500, the castle was rebuilt into a chateau. About the county of Werdenberg Sigmaringen came in 1535 to be owned by the high noble family of the Hohenzollern.

=== Modern times ===
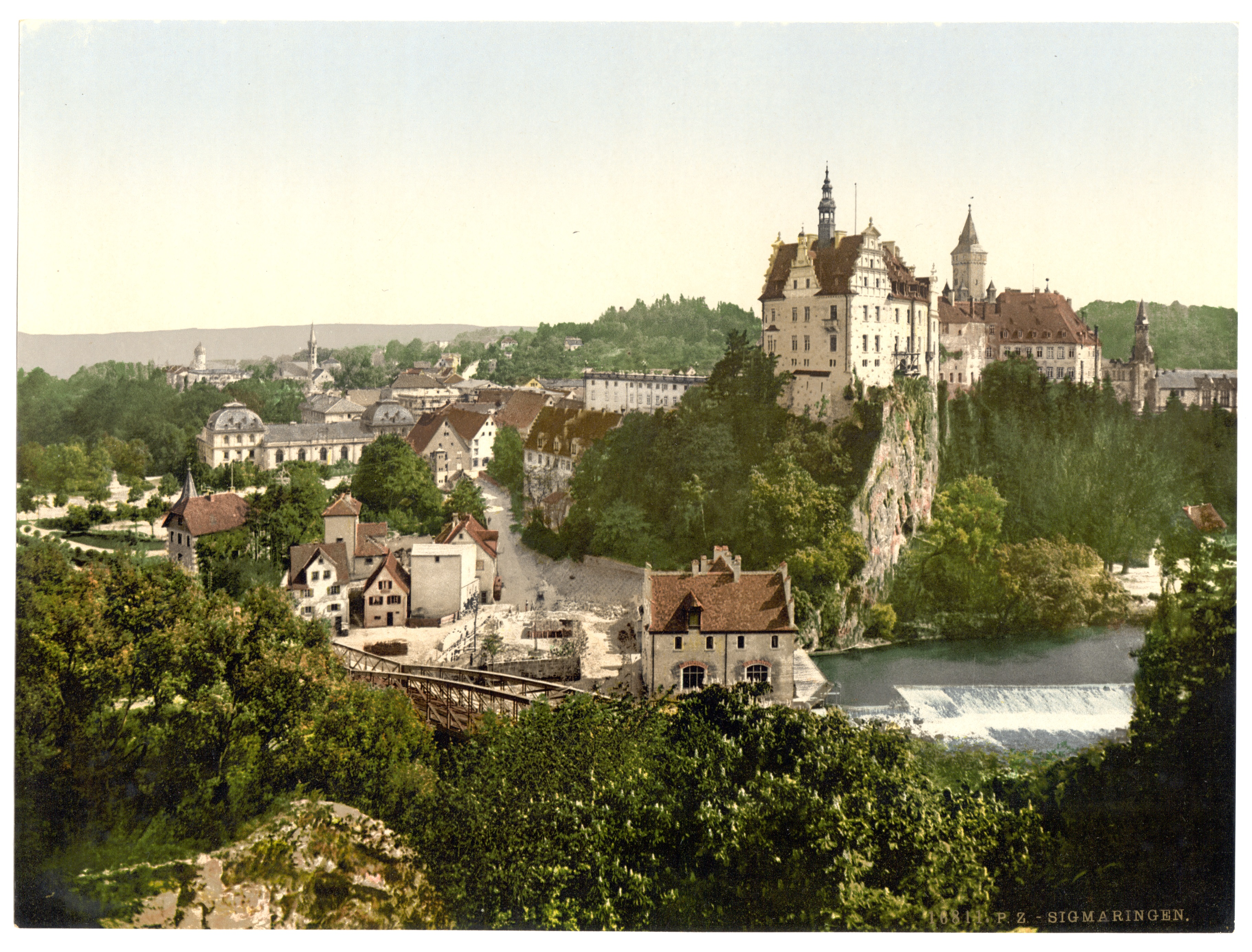
Sigmaringen, c. 1900

Sigmaringen, 1929

In 1632, the Swedes occupied the castle during the Thirty Years' War.

From 1806 to 1849, Sigmaringen was the capital of the sovereign Principality Hohenzollern-Sigmaringen and residence of the princes of Hohenzollern.

As a result of the Sigmaringen Revolution of 1848, the Princes of Hechingen and Sigmaringen abdicated, whereby both principalities fell to Prussia in 1850. From 1850 to 1945, Sigmaringen was the seat of the Prussian Government for the Province of Hohenzollern. Karl Anton von Hohenzollern was 1858-1862 Prime Minister of Prussia. From 1914 to 1918, around 150 men from the town died during World War I. In the Nazi era, a Gestapo office was located in Sigmaringen. From 1937, it belonged to Stuttgart's Gestapo.

Between 1934 and 1942, more than 100 men were sterilized because of "hereditary diseases". On 12 December 1940, during the Nazi medical experiments known as the "T4", 71 mentally disabled and mentally ill patients became the victims of Nazi injustice. These men and women were deported to the Grafeneck Euthanasia Centre, where they were killed as "unworthy of life". After the closure of Grafeneck in December 1940, a further deportation to the Hadamar Euthanasia Centre occurred on 14 March 1941.

==== Vichy French enclave (1944–1945) ====
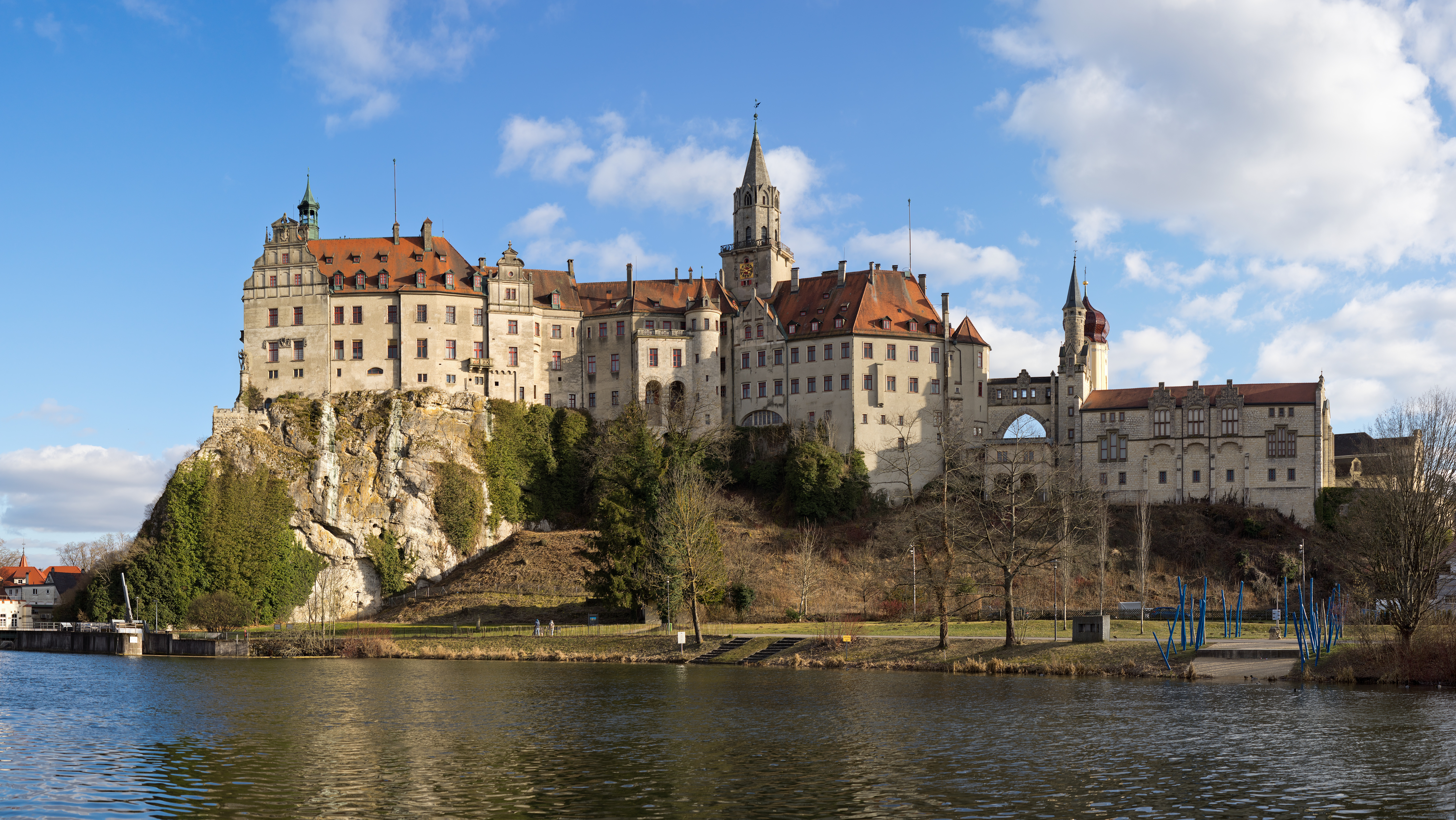
The Castle of Sigmaringen

On 7 September 1944, following the Allied invasion of France, Philippe Pétain and members of the Vichy government cabinet were relocated to Germany, a move which Petain fiercely fought against. A city-state ruled by the government in exile headed by Fernand de Brinon was established at Sigmaringen. One of its most notorious members was Joseph Darnand, head of the paramilitary pro-Vichy Milice. There were three embassies in the city-state, representing each of Vichy-France's allies: Germany, Italy, and Japan.

French writers Louis-Ferdinand Céline, Lucien Rebatet and Roland Gaucher, fearing for their lives because of their political and antisemitic writings, fled along with the Vichy government to Sigmaringen. Céline's novel D'un château l'autre (English: Castle to Castle) describes the fall of Sigmaringen. The city was taken by Free French forces on 22 April 1945. Pétain returned to France, where he stood trial for treason and was condemned to death, though the sentence was commuted by Charles de Gaulle.

== Transportation infrastructure ==
Three railways meet in Sigmaringen, the Ulm–Sigmaringen railway leading to Ulm, the Tübingen–Sigmaringen railway from Tübingen to Aulendorf and connecting to the Tuttlingen–Inzigkofen railway to Tuttlingen, and the Engstingen–Sigmaringen railway operated by the Hohenzollerische Landesbahn.

Sigmaringen lies in the serving area of Verkehrsverbund Neckar-Alb-Donau (NALDO).

== Notable people ==
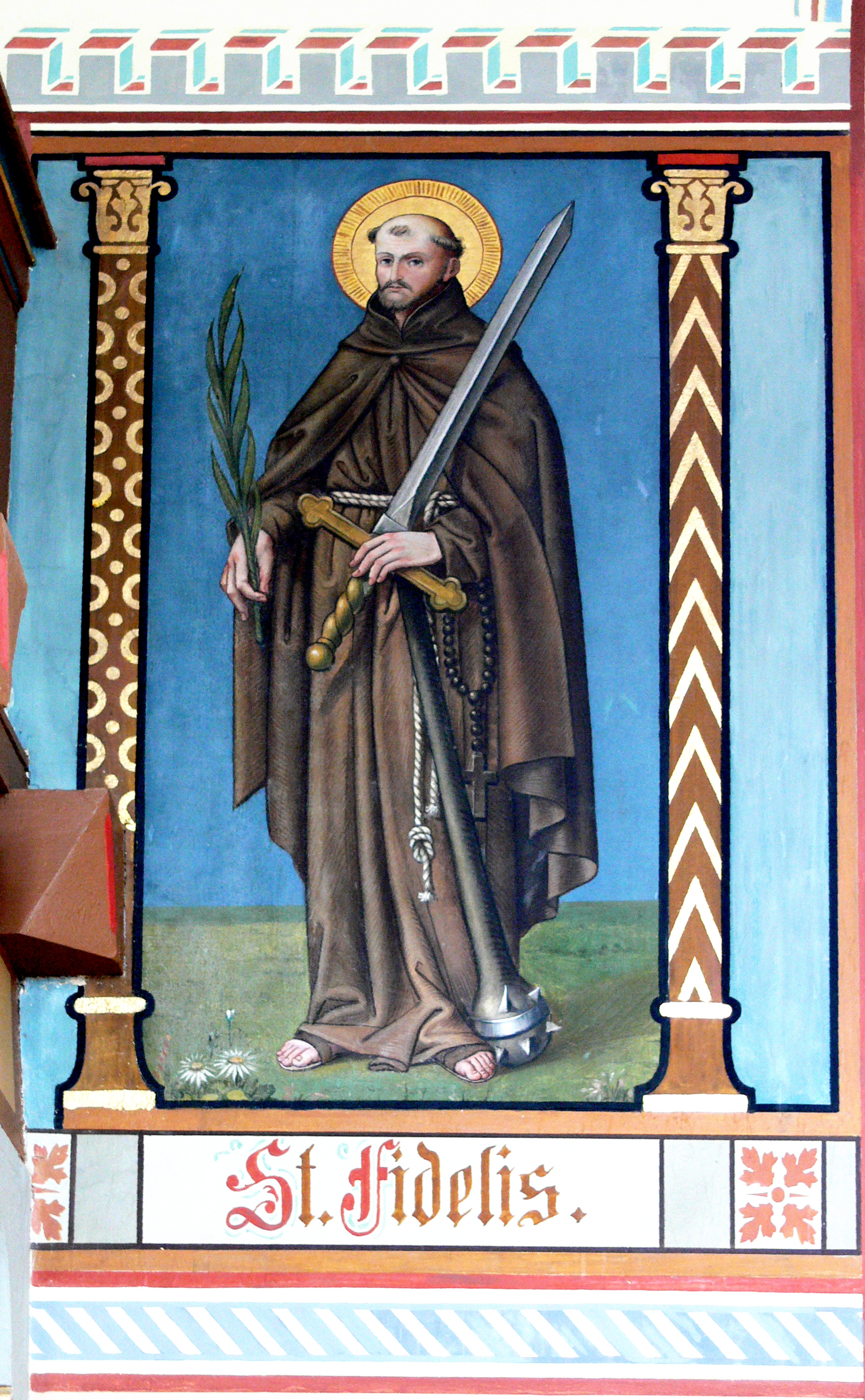
Fidelis of Sigmaringen

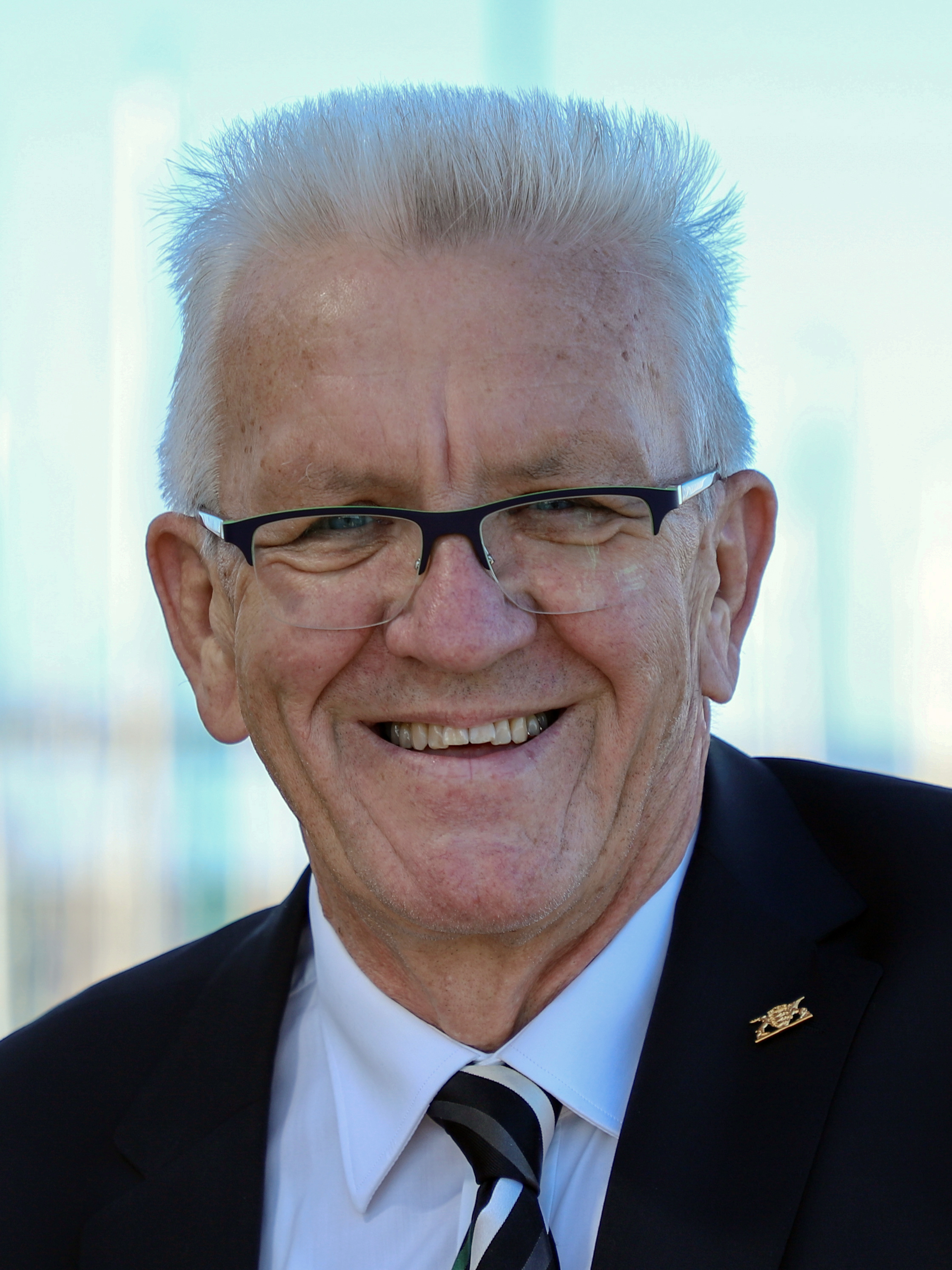
Winfried Kretschmann, 2018

- Fidelis of Sigmaringen (1577-1622), a Roman Catholic Capuchin martyr of the Counter-Reformation in Switzerland.
- Rosina Gräf genannt Nellin (born in Sigmaringen, died 1577) not guilty in fire as witch
- Frederick Miller (1824–1888) was a US brewery owner, founded Miller Brewing Company, learned brewing locally
- Richard Lauchert (1825–1868), portrait painter and professor
- Theodor Bilharz (1825–1862), physician and scientist, made discoveries re parasitology.
- Sophie Stehle (1838–1921), an operatic soprano.
- Virgilia Lütz (1869–1949), a Benedictine abbess of Nonnberg Abbey in Salzburg, 1921 to 1949.
- Max Giese (1879–1935), contractor, inventor of the concrete pump
- Louis-Ferdinand Céline (1894–1961), pro-Nazi and antisemitic French writer, fled to Sigmaringen in 1944.
- Josef Henselmann (1898–1987), sculptor and longtime head of the Academy of Fine Arts, Munich
- Lucien Rebatet (1903–1972), pro-Nazi and antisemitic French writer, fled to Sigmaringen in 1944.
- Franz Gog, (DE Wiki) (1907–1980), local politician (CDU) and judge in Sigmaringen where he died
- Hermann Schwörer (1922-2017), lawyer, entrepreneur and politician (CDU)
- Karl Lehmann (1936-2018), Cardinal and Bishop of Mainz, 1987 to 2008, chairman, German Bishops' Conference
- Lothar Späth (1937–2016), politician (CDU), former Prime Minister of Baden-Württemberg
- Dietmar Schlee, (DE Wiki) (1938-2002), local politician (CDU)
- Winfried Kretschmann (born 1948), politician, former Minister-President of Baden-Württemberg (The Greens), lives in the district of Laiz.
- Norbert Lins (born 1977), local politician (CDU), MEP, for Tübingen area
- Marcel Heister (born 1992 in Albstadt), footballer who has played over 280 games
- Pascal Wehrlein (born 1994), former Formula 1 and current Formula E racing driver

=== Aristocracy ===
- Karl Friedrich, Prince of Hohenzollern-Sigmaringen (1724–1785), Prince of Hohenzollern-Sigmaringen, born locally
- Karl, Prince of Hohenzollern-Sigmaringen (1785–1853), reigning Prince of Hohenzollern-Sigmaringen, born locally
- Karl Anton, Prince of Hohenzollern (1811-1885), the last prince of Hohenzollern-Sigmaringen, born and died locally
- Carol I of Romania (1839-1914), King of Romania from 1866 to his death in 1914; born locally
- Ferdinand I of Romania (1865–1927), King of Romania, 1914 until his death in 1927; born locally
- Princess Urraca of Bourbon-Two Sicilies (1913-1999), member of the House of Bourbon-Two Sicilies died locally
- Prince Friedrich Wilhelm of Hohenzollern-Sigmaringen (1924–2010), head of the House of Hohenzollern, 1965-2010, died locally.
- Prince Johann Georg of Hohenzollern (1932–2016), art historian and museum director, born and buried locally
- Karl Friedrich von Hohenzollern (born 1952), head of the Catholic House of Hohenzollern#Swabian branch, born locally

== Twin towns ==
- Feldkirch, Vorarlberg, Austria

== Bibliography ==
- Mauthner, Martin (2016). Otto Abetz and His Paris Acolytes: French Writers Who Flirted with Fascism, 1930–1945. Eastbourne, England: Sussex Academic Press. ISBN 978-1-84519-784-1. OCLC 987647015.
