= Sigmaringen (district) =

Coordinates: 48°05′N 9°10′E

- District
- Flag Coat of arms
- Country: Germany
- State: Baden-Württemberg
- Adm. region: Tübingen
- Capital: Sigmaringen

Government
  - District admin.: Stefanie Bürkle (CDU)

Area
  - Total: 1,204.35 km^{2} (465.00 sq mi)

Population (31 December 2024)
  - Total: 132,167
  - Density: 109.741/km^{2} (284.229/sq mi)
- Time zone: UTC+01:00 (CET)
  - Summer (DST): UTC+02:00 (CEST)
- Vehicle registration: SIG, SLG, STO, ÜB
- Website: landratsamt-sigmaringen.de

Sigmaringen is a Landkreis (district) in the south of Baden-Württemberg, Germany. Neighboring districts are (from north clockwise) Reutlingen, Biberach, Ravensburg, Bodensee, Constance, Tuttlingen, and Zollernalbkreis.

== History ==
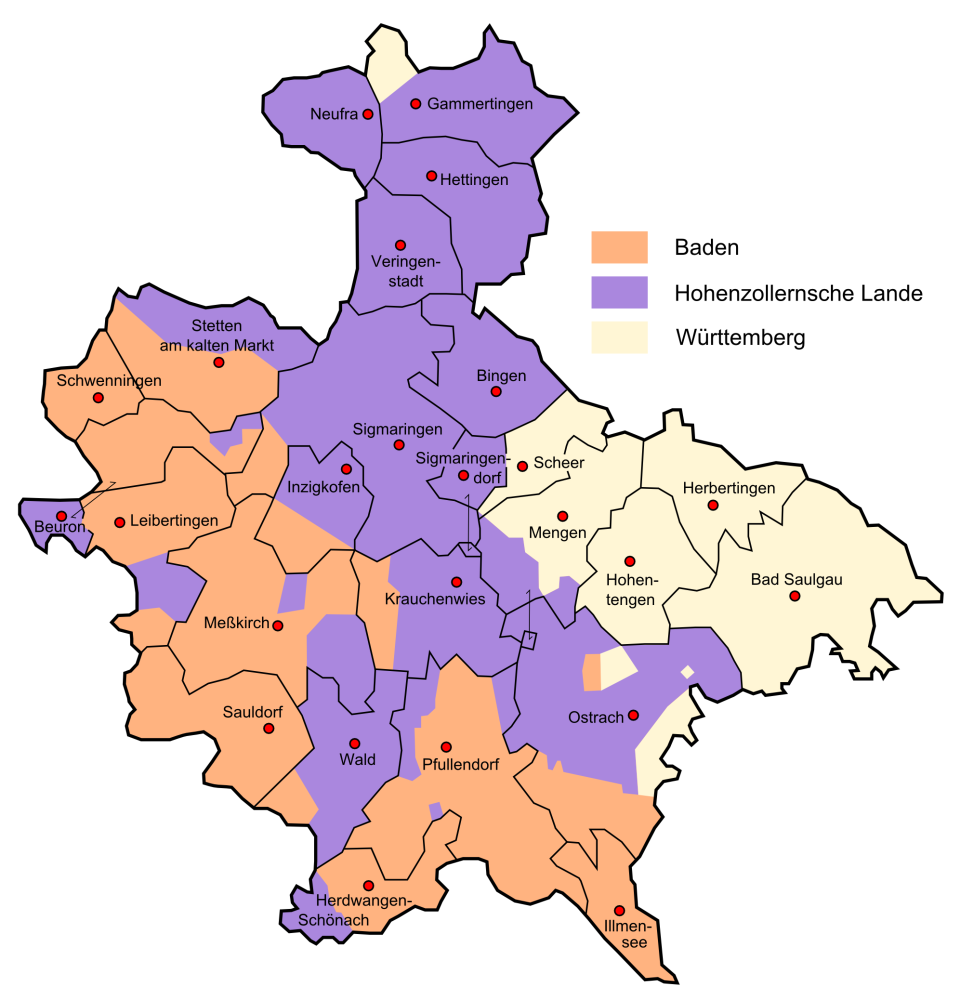
The portions of the modern district of Sigmaringen which were formerly part of Hohenzollern (purple), Baden (orange) and Württemberg (cream)

The area of the district was owned by several different states historically. It was split between many minor rulers before the German Mediatisation of the late 18th and early 19th centuries. By 1806 it had become a border area between the Grand Duchy of Baden, the Kingdom of Württemberg, and the much smaller principality of Hohenzollern-Sigmaringen embedded between them.

In 1849 Hohenzollern-Sigmaringen became part of the Prussian Province of Hohenzollern (along with the principality of Hohenzollern-Hechingen). At that time it had the Oberämter of Sigmaringen and Gammertingen, which were merged into the Landkreis of Sigmaringen in 1925. After WWII it became part of the French-controlled state of Württemberg-Hohenzollern until 1952 when it became part of the modern Land of Baden-Württemberg. In 1973 the district was enlarged by adding municipalities from the neighboring districts: Saulgau, Stockach, Überlingen and Reutlingen. A roughly equal portion of the district's area came from each of the three historic states.

== Geography ==
Landkreis Sigmaringen is located in the Swabian Alb mountains, which represent an old glacially-shaped landscape formed by prehistoric moraines. In the south of the district, a line running from Bad Saulgau to Ostrach to Pfullendorf roughly marks the southernmost extent of this prehistoric moraine. This line also marks the Rhine-Danube watershed: north of this line, water drains to the Danube; south of it, water drains to Lake Constance and the Rhine. The Danube flows through the district from west to east for about 60 km. About 30 km of this distance, between Fridingen and Inzigkofen, takes the form of a dramatic canyon through the Swabian Alb. The highest points in the district are the 921 m-tall Schnaitkapf, near Schwenningen in the Alb, and the 837 m-tall Höchsten in the southeast of the district.

The district is also located in Linzgau and Upper Swabia.

== Coat of arms ==
The deer in the coat of arms is the symbol of the duchy of Sigmaringen as well as that of the city of Sigmaringen. This symbol probably is from the Counts of Peutengau-Hirschberg who were the Lords of Sigmaringen until 1253. Hirsch is the German word for deer. The red color with the white bar below the deer derives from the Austrian coat of arms, as part of the district belonged to Austria historically.

== Towns and municipalities ==
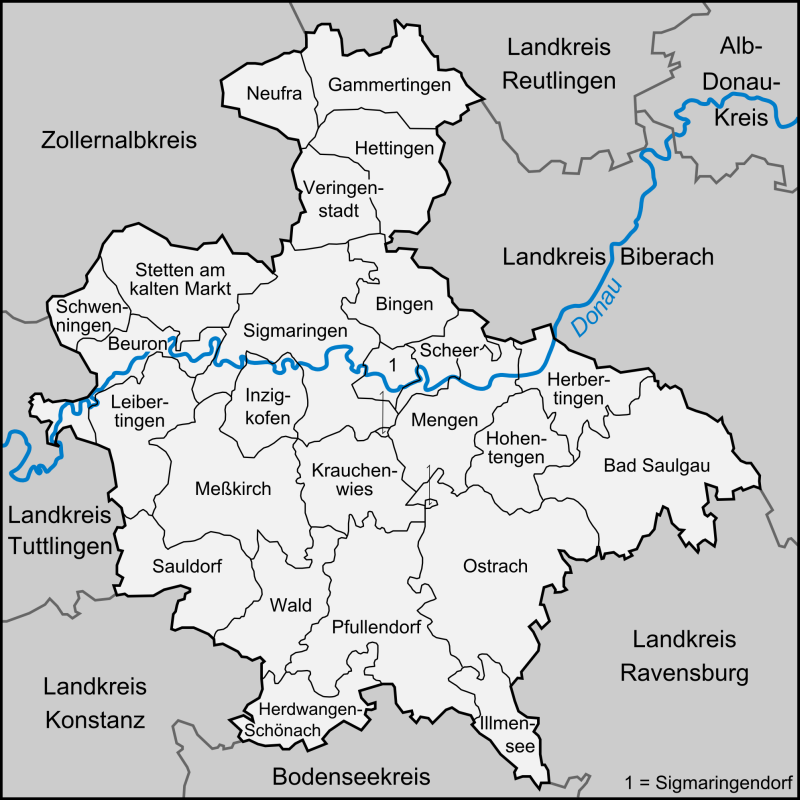
Clickable map of towns and municipalities in the district

Towns
1. Bad Saulgau
2. Gammertingen
3. Hettingen
4. Mengen
5. Meßkirch
6. Pfullendorf
7. Scheer
8. Sigmaringen
9. Veringenstadt
Verwaltungsgemeinschaften
1. Gammertingen
2. Mengen
3. Meßkirch
4. Pfullendorf
5. Bad Saulgau
6. Sigmaringen
7. Stetten
Municipalities
1. Beuron
2. Bingen
3. Herbertingen
4. Herdwangen-Schönach
5. Hohentengen
6. Illmensee
7. Inzigkofen
8. Krauchenwies
9. Leibertingen
10. Neufra
11. Ostrach
12. Sauldorf
13. Schwenningen
14. Sigmaringendorf
15. Stetten am kalten Markt
16. Wald
