= Inzigkofen =

- Municipality
- Coat of arms

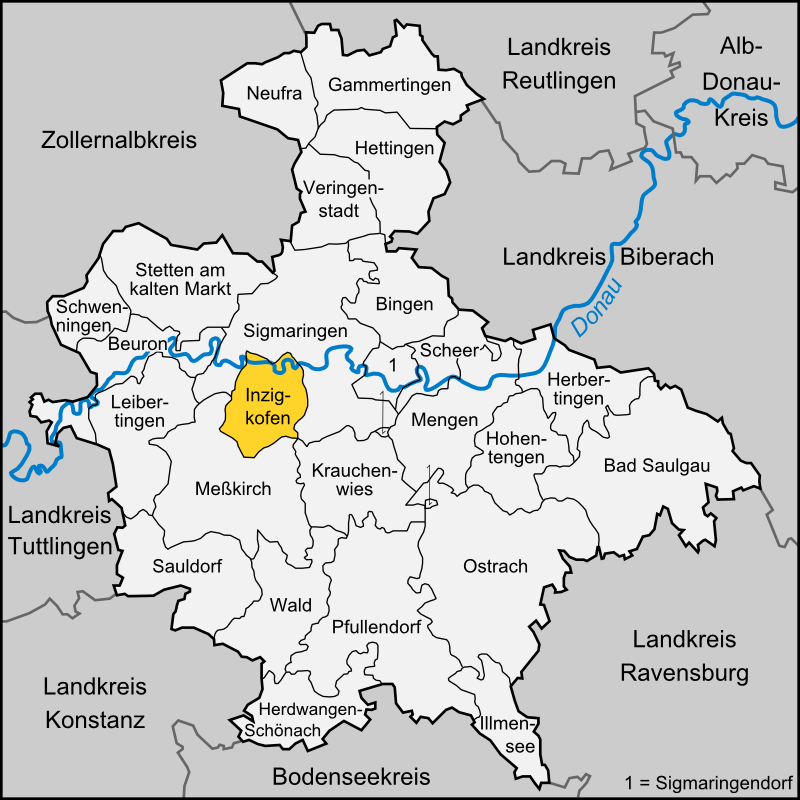
- Location of Inzigkofen within Sigmaringen district
- Interactive map of Inzigkofen
- Location within Germany Location within Baden-Württemberg
- Coordinates: 48°4′18″N 9°10′32″E
- Country: Germany
- State: Baden-Württemberg
- Admin. region: Tübingen
- District: Sigmaringen

Government
  - Mayor (2020–28): Bernd Gombold

Area
  - Total: 28.76 km^{2} (11.10 sq mi)
- Elevation: 590 m (1,940 ft)

Population (2025-12-31)
  - Total: 2,969
  - Density: 103.2/km^{2} (267.4/sq mi)
- Time zone: UTC+01:00 (CET)
  - Summer (DST): UTC+02:00 (CEST)
- Postal codes: 72514
- Dialling codes: 07571
- Vehicle registration: SIG
- Website: www.inzigkofen.de

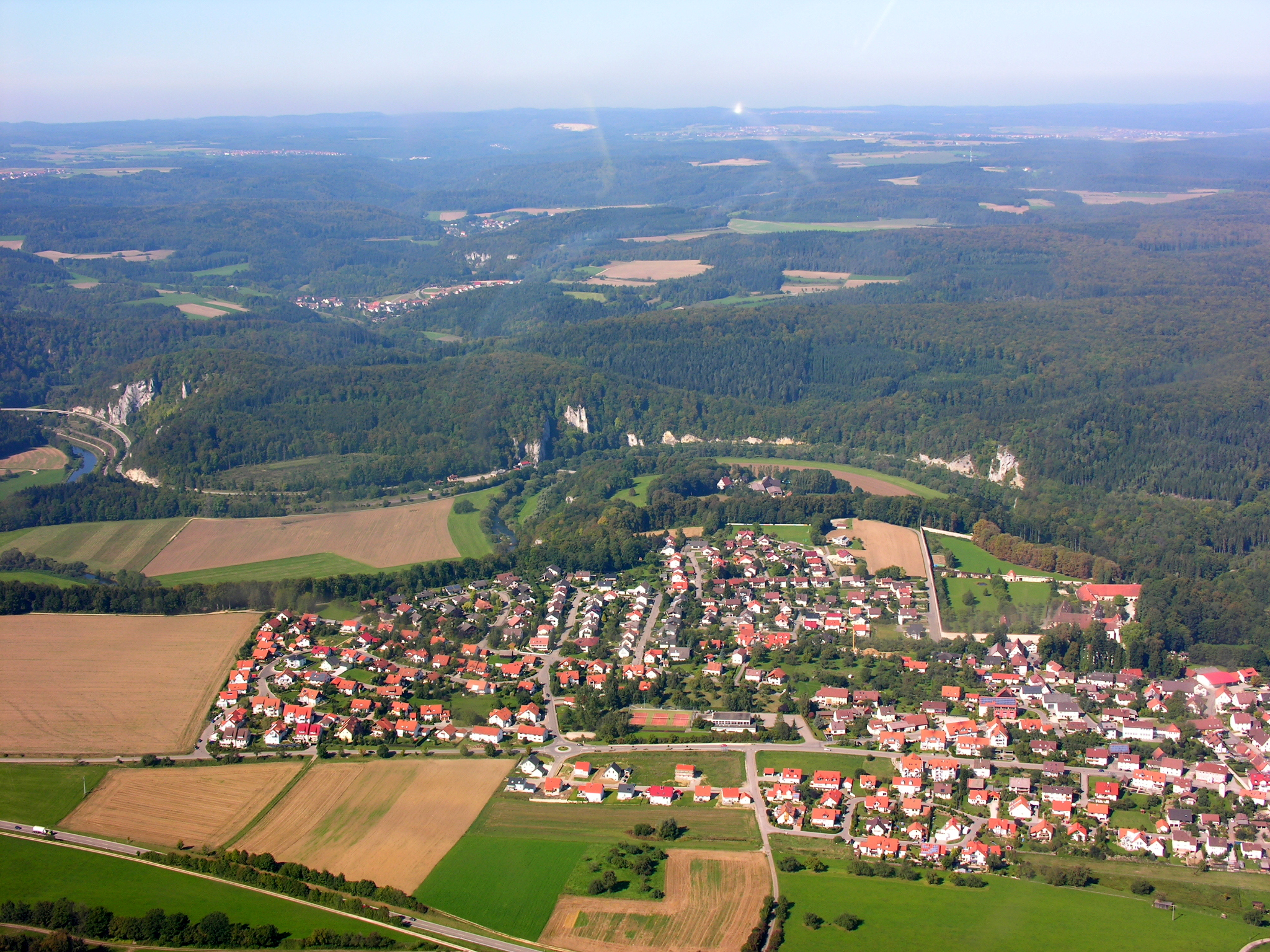
Inzigkofen

Inzigkofen is a municipality in the district of Sigmaringen in Baden-Württemberg in Germany. Historically, it is part of the Swabian north Alpine foreland basin.

It consists of three districts:

Coat of Arms	District (Teilort)	Population	Area
Inzigkofen	Inzigkofen with Nickhof und Pault	1372	931 hectares (2,300 acres)
Engelswies	Engelswies	611	749 hectares (1,850 acres)
Vilsingen	Vilsingen with Dietfurt	845	1,196 hectares (2,960 acres)

Within Engelswies is the now-abandoned Talsberg quarry, known for its fossiliferous layers, and the site of evidence of the oldest Eurasian hominoids; a molar tooth found there in June 1973 was reported in June 2011 to have been "dated with relative precision at 17 to 17.1 Ma" (million years ago).

== Mayors ==
In November 2004 Bernd Gombold, was elected mayor with 96,8 % of the vote.

- 1946–1949: Fridolin Oswald
- 1949–1966: Johann Scherer
- 1967–1972: Manfred Sailer
- 1973–2005: Pius Widmer
- since 2005: Bernd Gombold
