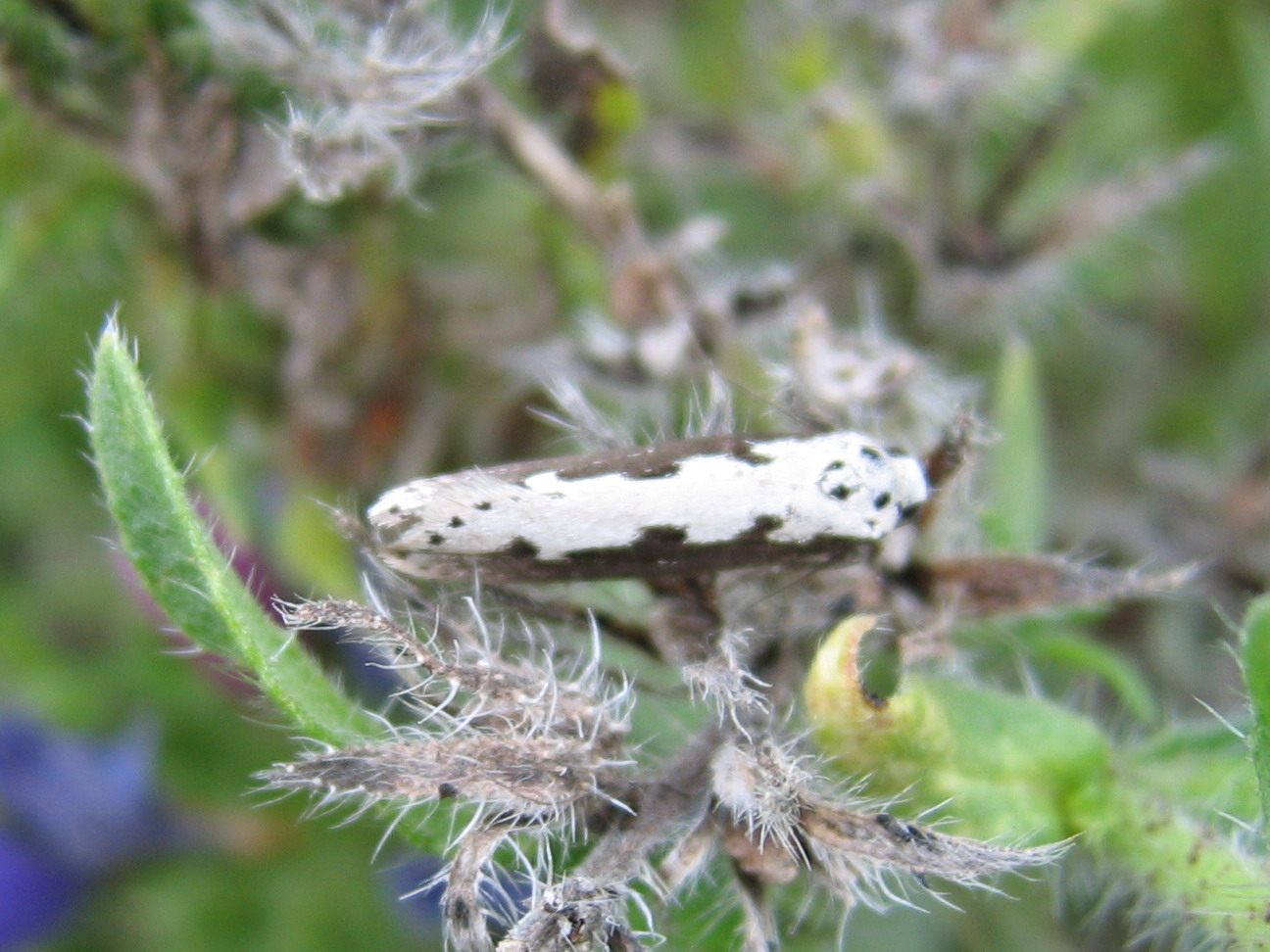

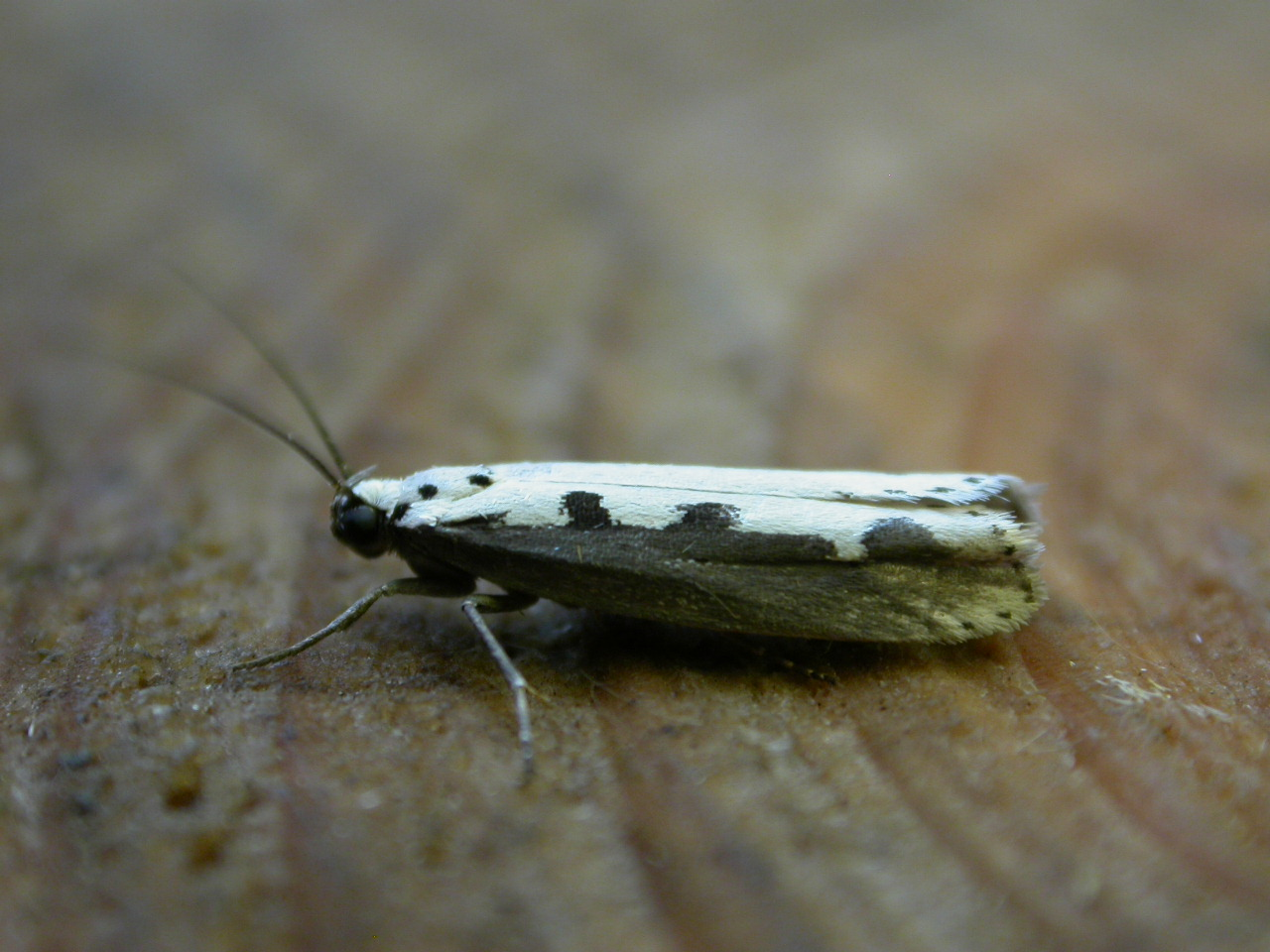

Scientific classification
- Domain: Eukaryota
- Kingdom: Animalia
- Phylum: Arthropoda
- Class: Insecta
- Order: Lepidoptera
- Family: Depressariidae
- Genus: Ethmia
- Species: E. bipunctella

Binomial name
- Ethmia bipunctella (Fabricius, 1775)

Synonyms
- Alucita bipunctella Fabricius, 1775; Ethmia bipunctella griseicostella Wiltshire, 1947; Ethmia echiella (Denis & Schiffermüller, 1775); Ethmia griseicostella Wiltshire, 1947; Tinea hochenwartiella Rossi, 1790; Ethmia hochenwartiella (Rossi, 1790); Psecadia bipunctelia (lapsus); Tinea echiella Denis & Schiffermüller, 1775

= Ethmia bipunctella =

Species of moth

The E. bipunctella invalidly described in 1936 by H. Rebel in L. Osthelder is actually E. distigmatella.

Ethmia bipunctella is a diurnal moth from the family Depressariidae. It can be found in Central and Southern Europe, North Africa, Asia and the northeastern part of North America. E. iranella was formerly included here as a subspecies.

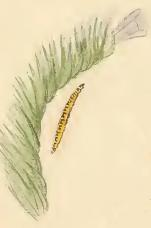
A sprig of Echium vulgare with larval web

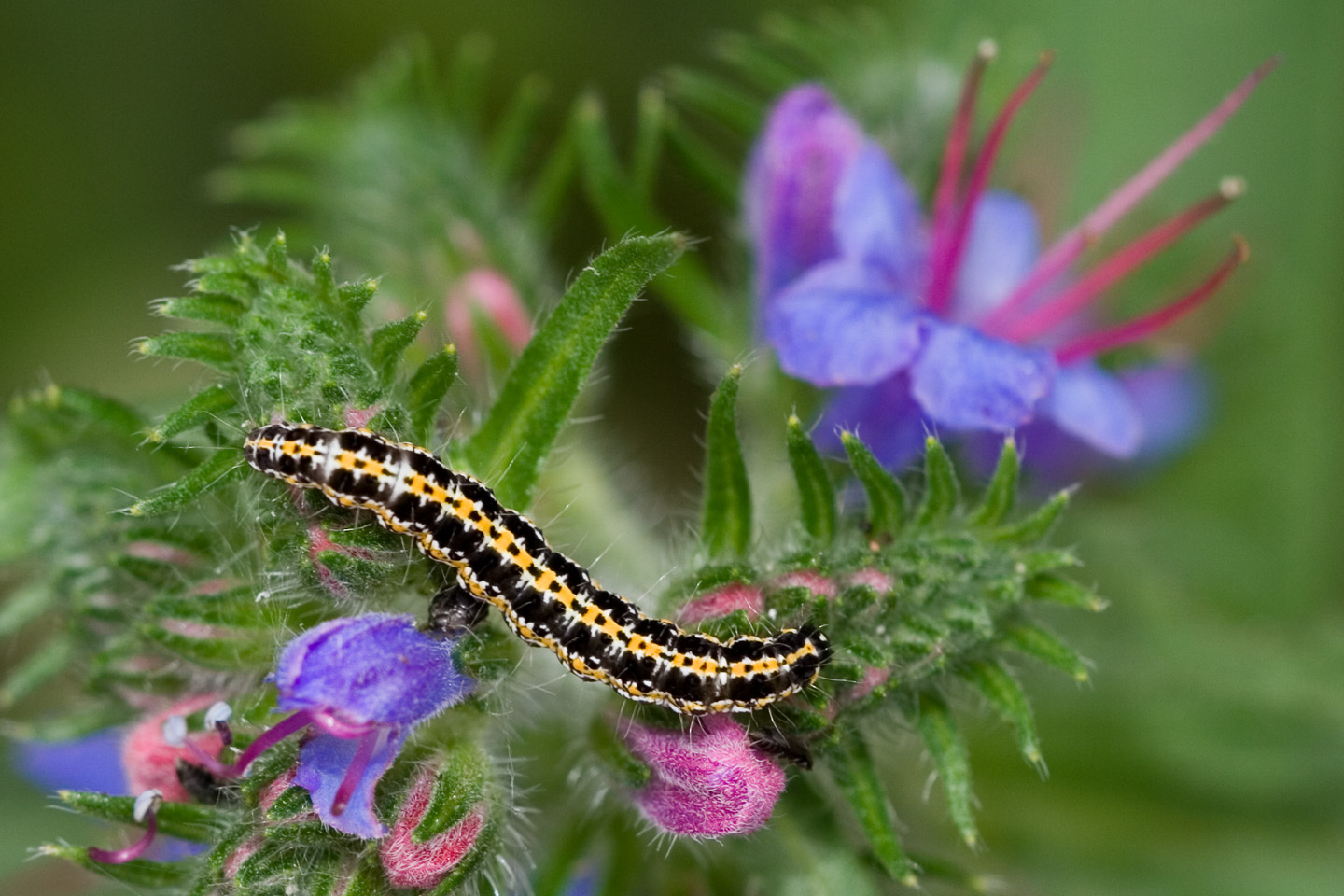
Caterpillar

The wingspan of the moth ranges from 19–28 millimetres (0.75–1.10 in). The flight time ranges from May to September. The moth is bivoltine, having two generations per year.

The most important host plant is the viper's bugloss, but also Anchusa officinalis and plants from the genus Symphytum. Pupae are attached to dead wood.
