= Ostrach (disambiguation) =

Ostrach is a municipality in the district of Sigmaringen in Baden-Württemberg in Germany.

Ostrach may also refer to:

- Simon Ostrach (1923–2017), American academic scientist
- Ostrach (Iller), a river of Bavaria, Germany, tributary of the Iller
- Ostrach (Danube), a river of Baden-Württemberg, Germany, tributary of the Danube
- Battle of Ostrach, occurred on 20–21 March 1799
