= Ostrach (Danube) =

River in Germany

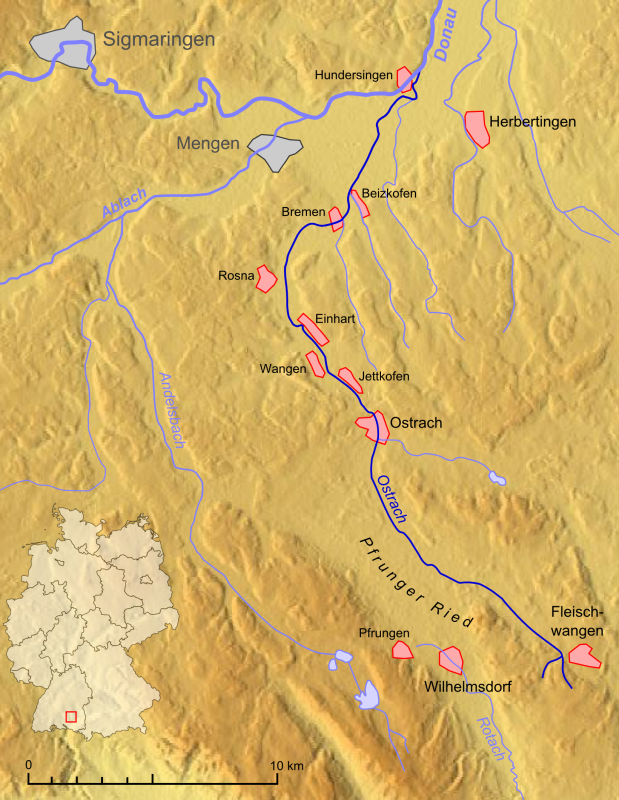
- Course of the Ostrach

Location
- Country: Germany
- State: Baden-Württemberg

Physical characteristics
- Source: west of Fleischwangen
  - location: Landkreis Ravensburg, Landkreis Sigmaringen, Baden-Württemberg, Germany
  - coordinates: 47°52′48.9″N 9°24′06″E
  - elevation: 620 m (2,030 ft)
- Mouth: Hundersingen
  - location: Herbertingen, Sigmaringen, Germany
  - coordinates: 48°04′25.2″N 9°19′10″E
  - elevation: 545 m (1,788 ft)
- Length: 33.4 km (20.8 mi)
- Basin size: 198 km^{2} (76 sq mi)

Basin features
- Progression: Danube→ Black Sea

The Ostrach (German pronunciation: [ˈɔstʁax]) is a 33.4-kilometre (20.8 mi) long right tributary stream of the Danube in Baden-Württemberg, Germany.

== Geography ==
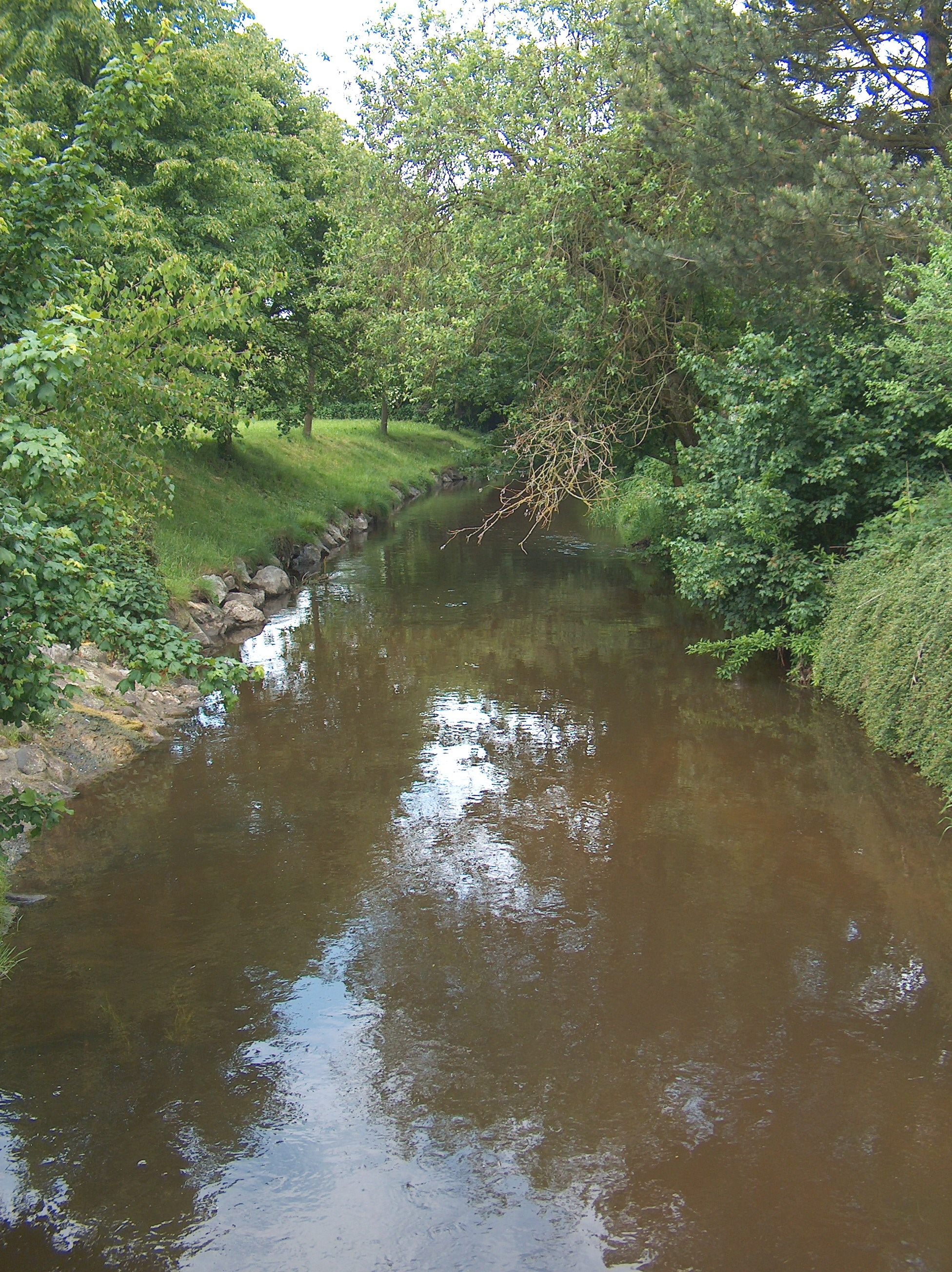
The stream flows through the village of Ostrach

The Ostrach originates on the north side of the European watershed, in the vicinity of Fleischwangen in the district of Ravensburg and drains out of the Pfrungen wetlands. It runs parallel to the Ablach for most of its length, flowing between two moraine hills by Ostrach, through the Weithart, and the Göge-Ablach plateau. The mouth of the Ostrach lies in Hundersingen, a suburb of the community of Herbertingen in the district of Sigmaringen where it runs for 22 kilometres (14 mi) to the Danube. The catchment area is 198 square kilometres (76 sq mi).

== Localities on the Ostrach ==
Die Ostrach traverses or touches several districts and communities from its source to the Danube: The locale of Fleischwangen, where it originates, Guggenhausen, Riedhausen, Ostrach and its subdivisions of Laubbach, Jettkofen, Wangen, Einhart and Habsthal, the Mengen city subdivision of Rosna, the Hohentengen subdivisions of Bremen and Beizkofen, and finally by Hundersingen, where it reaches the Danube.

== Tributaries ==
Tributaries of the Ostrach include the Wilhelmsdorf canal, the Fleischwanger Ach (creek), the Hornbach, the Tiefenbach and the Seebach.

== Ecology ==
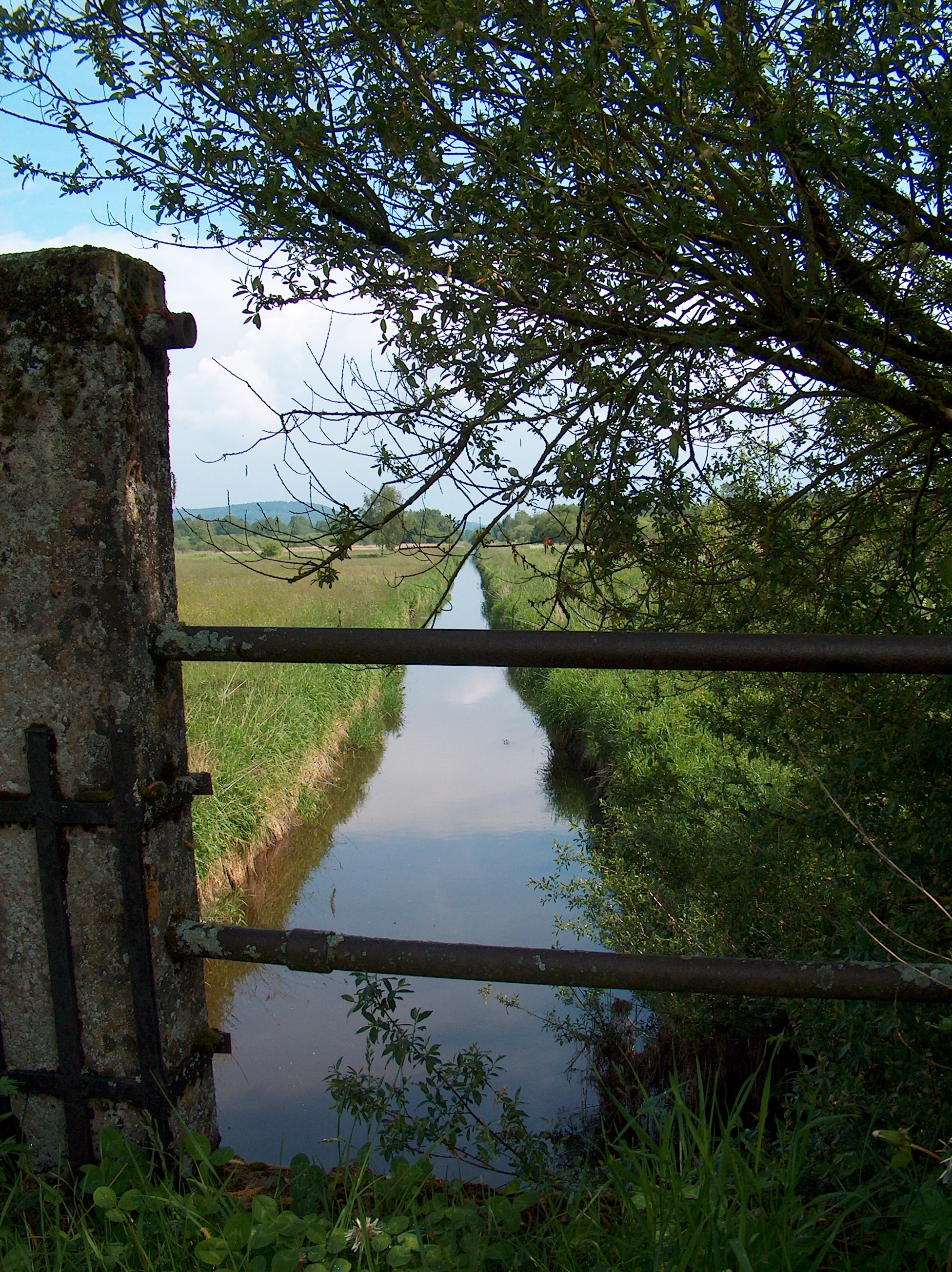
The Ostrach in the Pfrunger wetlands

Since 2005, a beaver population has developed in the Pfrunger-Burgweiler wetlands – since October 2008 verifiable. In the upper range of the Ostrach, the beavers have erected a dam across the stream, creating a pond that holds 1000 cubic meters of water, causing the tributaries of the Ostrach to overflow their banks, to the great frustration of the farmers in Riedhausen and Laubbach.

A seven million Euro protection project was planned with the goal to protect the wetlands and the watershed. The project has been finished in 2015.

== See also ==
- List of rivers of Baden-Württemberg
