= Georg Kronawitter =

German politician (1928–2016)

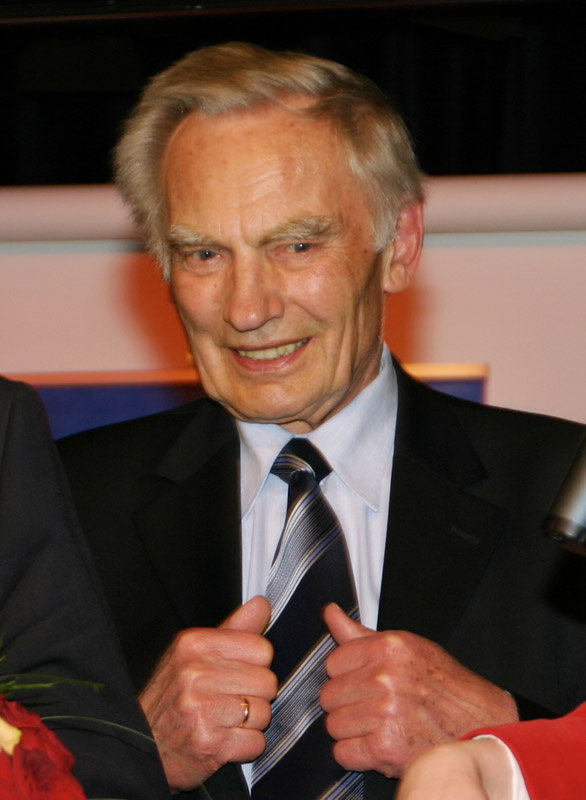
- Kronawitter in 2008

Mayor of Munich
- In office 11 June 1972 – 4 March 1978
- Preceded by: Hans-Jochen Vogel
- Succeeded by: Erich Kiesl
- In office 18 March 1984 – 30 June 1993
- Preceded by: Erich Kiesl
- Succeeded by: Christian Ude

Personal details
- Born: 21 April 1928 Schweitenkirchen, Bavaria, Germany
- Died: 28 April 2016 (aged 88)
- Party: Social Democratic Party

Georg Kronawitter (21 April 1928 – 28 April 2016) was a German politician of the SPD. He was mayor of Munich from 1972 to 1978 and from 1984 to 1993.

== Early life and education ==
Kronawitter was born in Oberthann, a part of Schweitenkirchen, in the district of Pfaffenhofen. He became an elementary school teacher in 1949, and earned his certification as a Diplom-Handelslehrer (business teacher) in 1956.

== Career in politics ==
Kronawitter joined the SPD in 1961 and was elected to the Landtag of Bavaria in 1966. In the 1972 local elections, he was elected Mayor of Munich with 55.9 percent of the votes, succeeding Hans-Jochen Vogel. Due to conflicts within his party, he did not run for mayorship in the 1978 elections, and was succeeded by the CSU's Erich Kiesl. Six years later, he was elected mayor again in the 1 April 1984 run-off election, with 58.1 percent of the votes. In 1990, he was reelected with 61.64 percent of the votes.

After his mayoral career, Kronawitter was a major supporter of the successful Initiative-Unser-München petition, which stipulates that no high rise buildings whose height exceeds that of the Frauenkirche (99 m) may be built in Munich.

== Honours ==
In 1978, Kronawitter was honored with the Ludwig-Thoma medal. In 1993, he was honored by the city of Munich for his commitment to social justice and his early awareness of ecological possibilities of fiscal policy. In July 2014 he was honoured with the freedom of Munich prize, aimed at highlighting the work of political figures.

Political offices
Preceded by Hans-Jochen Vogel	Mayor of Munich; 1972–1978	Succeeded by Erich Kiesl
Preceded by Erich Kiesl	Mayor of Munich; 1984–1993	Succeeded by Christian Ude
