= Karl Fiehler =

German Nazi, Mayor of Munich, SS-Obergruppenführer (1895–1969)

- Fiehler in September 1938

Mayor of Munich
- In office 20 March 1933 – 4 May 1945
- Preceded by: Karl Scharnagl
- Succeeded by: Karl Scharnagl

Reichsleiter
- In office 2 June 1933 – 8 May 1945

Personal details
- Born: 31 August 1895 Braunschweig, German Empire
- Died: 8 December 1969 (aged 74) Dießen am Ammersee, Bavaria, West Germany
- Party: Nazi Party
- Occupation: Merchant

Military service
- Rank: SS-Obergruppenführer

Karl Fiehler (31 August 1895 – 8 December 1969) was a German Nazi Party (NSDAP) official and Mayor of Munich from 1933 until 1945. He was an early member of the Nazi Party having joined in 1920. In 1933, he became a Reichsleiter in the party and was a member of the Reichstag. In March 1933, he was appointed Mayor of Munich and held that post until the end of World War II in Europe. During his time as mayor, Fiehler was zealously antisemitic and saw to it that the Jewish population of the city was persecuted. After the war in January 1949, Fiehler was sentenced to two years in a labour camp, but the sentence was suspended given the previous three-and-a-half years of detention he had already served.

== Early life ==
Fiehler was born in Braunschweig, German Empire. As a child, he attended a secondary modern school in Munich and afterwards he began a merchant apprenticeship, which he continued in Schleswig-Holstein in 1914. Fiehler served in World War I and was decorated with the Iron Cross, second class. In 1919 he entered the local government of the city of Munich as an administration trainee and in 1922 successfully passed the examination for the administrative and clerical grade.

== Nazi Party career ==
By 1920 he had already joined the Nazi Party with the membership number 37. In 1923, Karl Fiehler became a member of the Stoßtrupp-Hitler (Shock Troop-Hitler), that had been established to provide personal protect for Hitler. On 8 and 9 November 1923, he participated actively in the failed Beer Hall Putsch. For his participation, Fiehler was sentenced to 15 months' Festungshaft ('fortress confinement') in Landsberg fortress.

From 1924 until 1933 he was an honorary alderman and in 1929 he outlined the principles of Nazi local politics in his 80-page booklet "National Socialist Municipal Policy", printed by the Munich publishing house "Franz-Eher-Verlag", which was the central party publisher of the NSDAP. During the 1930s he published on several occasions concerning local politics in Germany from a National Socialist point of view.

Fiehler, who—as an early Nazi Party member—was not only allowed to call himself proudly "Alter Kämpfer" (Old Combatant), which meant members who had joined the Party before the Nazi takeover on 30 January 1933, but could also call himself one of the "Alte Garde" (Old Guard) pre-eminent in the hierarchy as (party members with membership numbers under 100,000) and climbed the party career ladder rapidly. From 1927 until 1930 he was the Ortsgruppenleiter (local chapter leader) of the Nazi Party in Munich.

=== In power ===
Following the Machtergreifung (Seizure of Power) of January 1933, Fiehler's rise in the party continued. From June 1933 until the end of the Nazi Germany in May 1945, he held the rank of a Reichsleiter, the second highest political rank in the NSDAP. He served at first as a secretary and afterwards as the head of the Main Office for Municipal Policy. He also belonged to the top-level management circle of the Nazi Party and being one of the twenty most intimate co-workers of Hitler in the NSDAP organization moved up the ranks quickly. He was also made a member of the Academy for German Law. On 31 July 1933 he joined the SS with the rank of SS-Standartenführer, being promoted on 24 December 1933 to SS-Oberführer and on 27 January 1934 to SS-Gruppenführer.

From November 1933 until 1945, Fiehler was also a member from electoral constituency 24, Upper Bavaria-Swabia, of the Nazi Reichstag which existed after the Enabling Act of 1933 and the so-called Gleichschaltung (synchronization). On 30 January 1942, Fiehler was promoted to SS-Obergruppenführer and was assigned to the Stab Reichsführer-SS (RFSS) (Staff Reichsführer-SS) Heinrich Himmler on 1 April 1936 where he remained until 9 November 1944.

=== Mayor of Munich ===
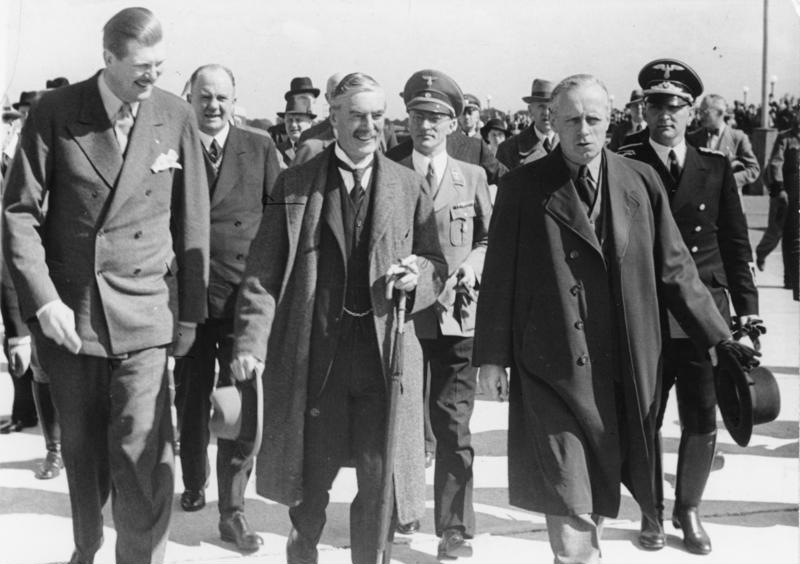
Karl Fiehler (second row, bright uniform, between Neville Chamberlain and Joachim von Ribbentrop) at the Munich Agreement 1938

On 9 March 1933 the Sturmabteilung (SA) occupied the Munich town hall and unfurled the swastika flag. Despite then First Mayor Karl Scharnagl, who belonged to the conservative Bavarian People's Party (BVP) and who defied the Nazis for eleven days on the top of the old city administration. However, on 20 March 1933 Adolf Wagner, Nazi Home Secretary of the Free State of Bavaria and Gauleiter of Munich and Upper Bavaria, appointed Karl Fiehler Provisional First Mayor. On 20 May 1933, Fiehler received the title Oberbürgermeister (Lord Mayor), a title that did not exist in Munich prior to that time.

All parties and organizations opposing the political Gleichschaltung were forbidden as a result of the National Socialist takeover, in Munich as well as throughout Germany. The "Book burning" (Bücherverbrennung) on the Königsplatz Square in front of the Staatliche Antikensammlung (Antiquity Collection) on 10 May 1933, the persecution of "non-folkish" (nicht-völkisch) writers, artists and scientists caused an exodus of Munich's intellectual elite. Thomas Mann and his family did not return from a journey abroad. On 22 March 1933, the Provisional Police Chief of Munich, Heinrich Himmler, opened the Dachau concentration camp.

In 1933, the "German Association of Cities" (Deutscher Städtetag) was forced to merge with other municipal umbrella organizations to form the "Deutscher Gemeindetag" (German Local Authorities Association). Fiehler was appointed chairman of this unity organization. The administrative office was situated on Alsenstraße in the Berlin-Tiergarten district. On 2 August 1935 a memorable conversation took place between Hitler and Karl Fiehler in the course of which Munich received a new epithet: Hauptstadt der Bewegung (Capital of the Movement). This "title" was given to remind the Germans of the NSDAP origins in Bavaria's metropolis.

During the 1930s a number of model buildings, prime examples of grandiose Nazi architecture, had been erected by Paul Ludwig Troost, the predecessor of Albert Speer as Hitler's "Court Master Builder", in Munich. A radical remodelling of Munich was intended, in which Fiehler wanted to illustrate as editor of the pictorial book München baut auf. Ein Tatsachen- und Bildbericht über den nationalsozialistischen Aufbau in der Hauptstadt der Bewegung ("Munich Rebuilds. A Factual and Pictorial Report on National Socialist Reconstruction in the Capital of the Movement"). By amalgamations on a grand scale, particularly in the west (Pasing district), the Munich population figure increased considerably from 746,000 (1936) to 889,000 (1943). Nevertheless, major projects like the relocation of the Munich Central Station to Laim district, did not get beyond the planning stage.

== Persecution of the Jews ==
Munich under Fiehler became the vanguard wherever it concerned actions against Jews. In the spring of 1933 the first systematic boycott against Jewish shops was very zealously carried out by Fiehler. On 30 March he decreed this sanction with anticipatory obedience, as the "official" date was actually 1 April. The SA and SS had been terrorising Jewish businessmen since the very beginning of March and had been taking them into Schutzhaft (protective custody). Fiehler proscribed—without any legal basis—municipal contracts with so called "non-German" companies. SA sentries bedaubed the fronts of Jewish shops with inscriptions like "Jew", the "Star of David" or "On vacation in Dachau!". Shop windows were smashed and their clients were intimidated, being mobbed by SA men who molested, registered and even photographed them. Later on the City of Munich hurried, in a quite exceptional manner, with the demolition of Jewish places of worship. The Minister of propaganda, Joseph Goebbels, had already commenced the destruction of Munich's main synagogue in June 1938, just to find out, whether the public's reaction would be shock or indifference. The apathetic behaviour of the population would encourage the Nazis to further new outrages.

On 9 November 1938 almost the whole Nazi Party elite convened for a social evening at the invitation of the Lord Mayor Fiehler in the Great Hall of Munich's Old Guildhall. A vicious antisemitic diatribe by Goebbels was, for the attendant SA and party-leaders, the signal for a general hunt on Jews. Numerous men and women were killed, tortured and injured in this night of pogrom, which was euphemistically referred to as Reichskristallnacht (Night of Broken Glass) in Germany afterwards. Many Jewish institutions, synagogues and shops fell prey to this devastation.

Munich's Municipal Cemeteries Department under Fiehler behaved in an absurd, strictly antisemitic, manner. It adamantly refused even deceased Christians of Jewish descent cremation or burials. Moreover, so-called "Jewish Christians" were no longer allowed to be buried in their own family graves, which had been in existence for generations. The department referred bureaucratically to surviving dependants as the "Israelite Community". Amongst other things it was no longer allowed to wear Protestant vestments at a funeral in a Jewish-orthodox graveyard. Johannes Zwanzger, who was appointed head of the "Munich aid office for non-Aryan Christians", formulated a letter of complaint to Lord Mayor Fiehler on behalf of the Bavarian Lutheran Regional Consistory in December 1938, without any success.

During World War II, genocide followed the disfranchisement of Jews. On 20 November 1941 the first transport of 1,000 Jewish men and women departed from Munich for Riga. The fictitious reason given to the scared people was that it was a matter of "evacuation". The transport was re-routed to Kaunas in Lithuania, because the Riga Ghetto was overcrowded at that time. Just after their arrival there, the deportees were murdered in a mass shooting by members of the Einsatzgruppen A under the command of SS-Brigadeführer Franz Walter Stahlecker in Fort IX of Kaunas. Up to February 1945, a total of 42 transports left Munich at irregular intervals: to exterminations in Kaunas, Piaski, (near Lublin), Auschwitz and also at the so-called "Ghetto for old and prominent people", the concentration camp Theresienstadt.

== Downfall and death ==
In the early afternoon of 30 April 1945, the first American soldiers led by 27-year-old Lieutenant Wolfgang F. Robinow approached Munich's central square Marienplatz. With the surrender of the town hall, the Nazi Party rule had ended in Munich. Fiehler had already left a long time before the occupation of Munich took place. On 4 May 1945, four days before the official end of World War II in Europe, the victorious American Forces reinstated Karl Scharnagl as Lord Mayor of the Bavarian capital.

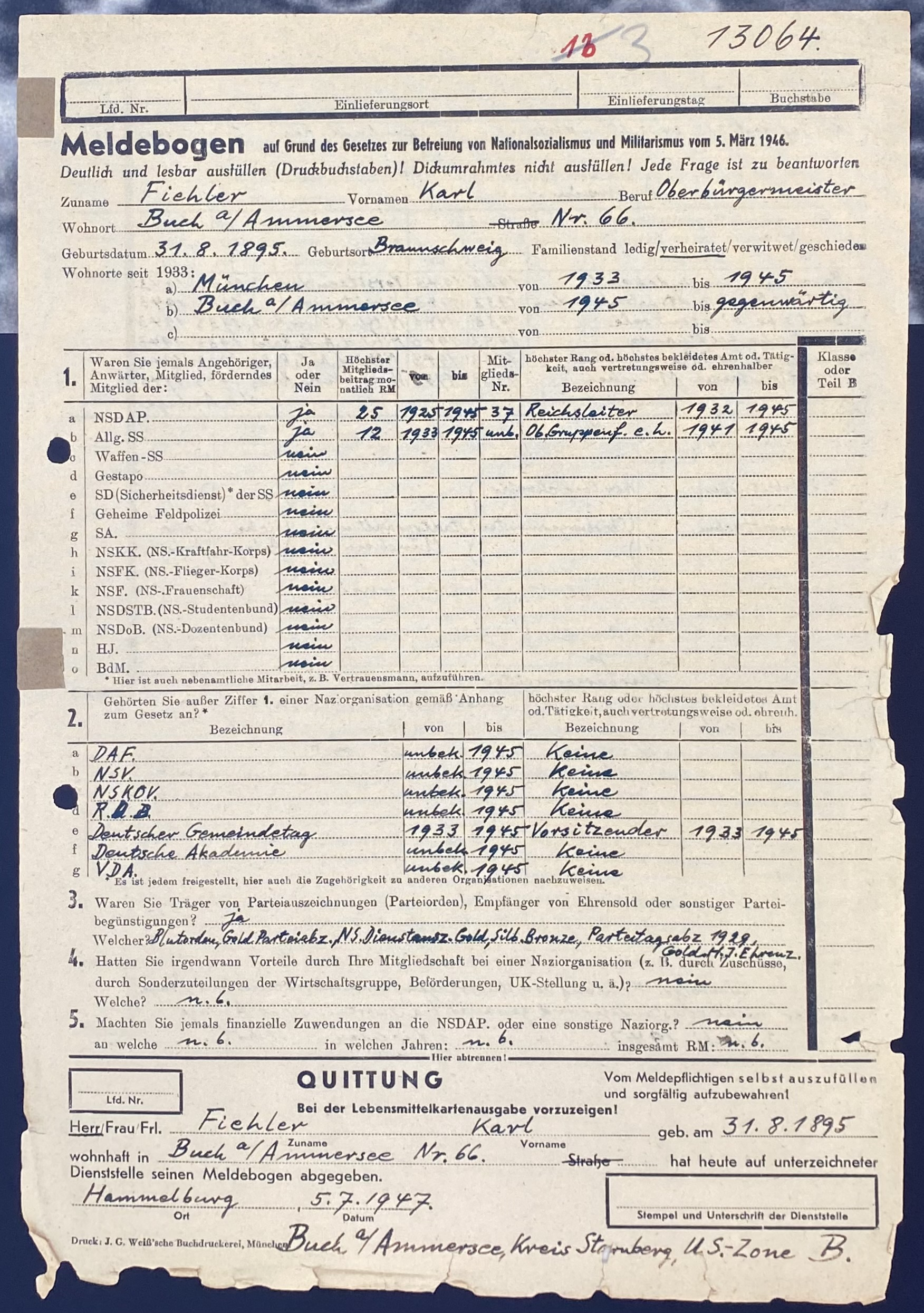
Denazification questionnaire filled out by Karl Fiehler, 1947

In January 1949, Fiehler, who was married and had three daughters, was sentenced to two years in a labour camp, the confiscation of one fifth of his property and a twelve-year employment ban after Spruchkammerverfahren (proceedings before denazification tribunals). However, he did not have to serve the sentence because the previous three and a half years of his detention were credited as time served. Fiehler died on 8 December 1969 in the village of Dießen on Lake Ammersee in the foothills of the Bavarian Alps.

== Decorations ==
- Iron Cross (1914), 2nd class
- Wound Badge (1918) in Black
- The Honour Cross of the World War 1914/1918 (1935)
- War Merit Cross, 1st and 2nd class
- Golden Party Badge of the NSDAP
- Blood Order
- Anschluss Medal
- Sudetenland Medal
- NSDAP Long Service Award in Bronze, Silver and Gold
- SS Honour Ring (Totenkopfring)
- Sword of honor of the Reichsführer-SS
- Grand Cross of the Order of the Lion of Finland (1943)

== See also ==
- List of SS-Obergruppenführer
- List of Nazi Party leaders and officials
- Nazi Germany: Nazi Party and Nazi government leaders and officials
- List of SS personnel
- List of Munich municipal leaders since 1818 (German Wikipedia)

== Notes ==
Political offices
Preceded by Eduard Schmid	Mayor of Munich; 1933–1945	Succeeded by Karl Scharnagl
