= Johannes von Widenmayer =

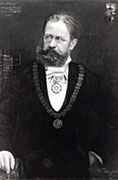
Johannes von Widenmayer (1838 - 1893)

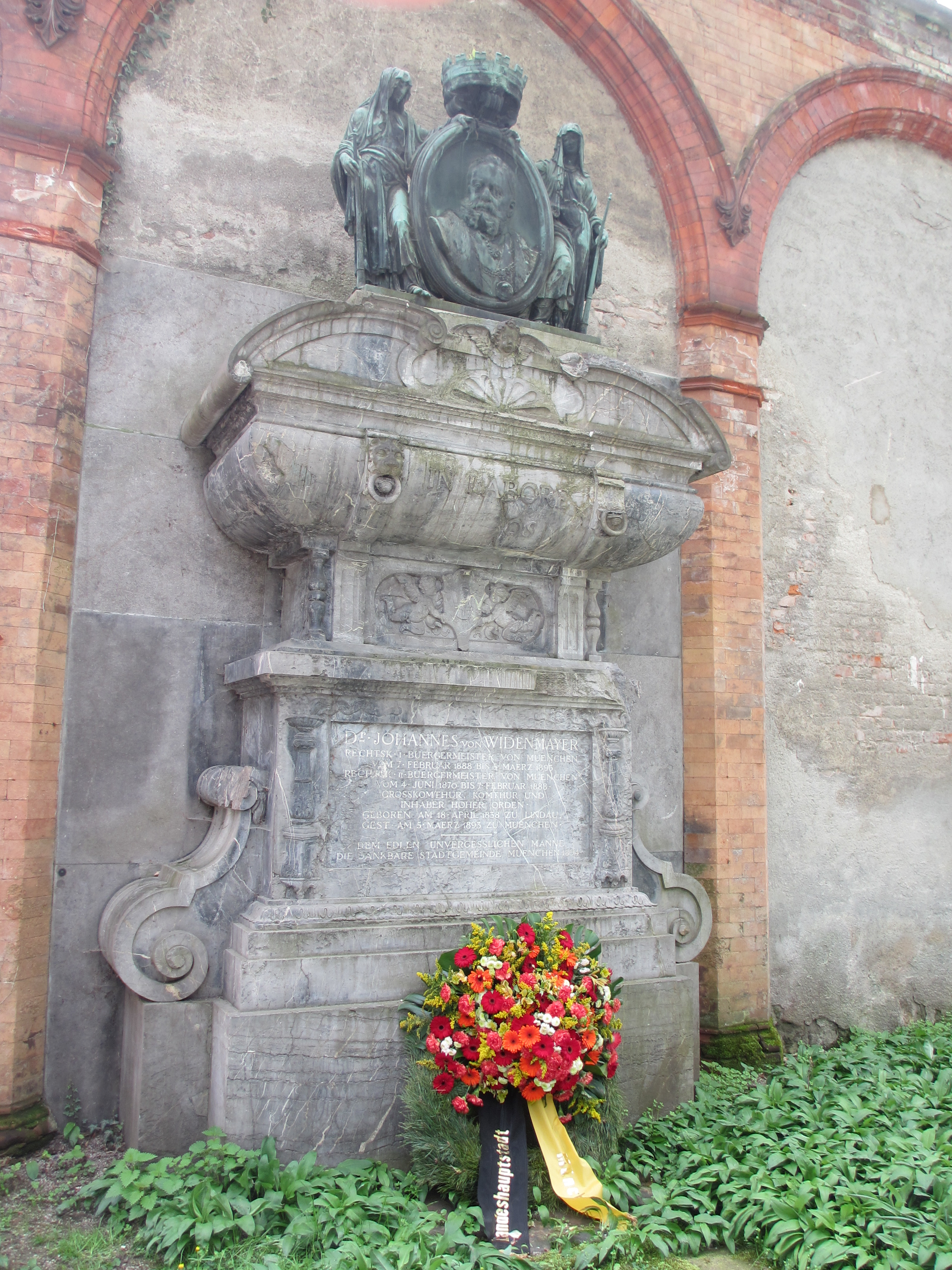
Grave of Johannes Widenmayer at the Old Southern Cemetery in Munich

Johannes von Widenmayer (18 April 1838 in Lindau – 5 March 1893 in Munich) was a German lawyer and Mayor of Munich from 1888 to 1893.

== Life ==
Widenmayer first attended the St. Anna-Gymnasium in Augsburg. After graduating from high school, he became a scholarship holder of the Maximilianeum Foundation in 1858 and began to study law at the Ludwig-Maximilians-Universität München, where he became a member of the Arminia/Algovia Fraternity in 1855. He later moved to Heidelberg University, where he received his doctorate in 1863. In July of the same year, Widenmayer was elected mayor of Lindau. On 4 June 1870, he was elected second mayor of the city of Munich by the newly elected municipal council as deputy to Alois von Erhardt. After Erhardt resigned, Widenmayer succeeded him on 16 February 1888. He held this office until his death (suicide by shooting) in March 1893.

== Tomb ==
The tomb of Johannes Widenmayer is located at the Old Southern Cemetery in Munich (Neu Arkaden Platz 88 near field 41). The tomb was designed by Hans Grässel. Anton Weigel created the model of the bronze elements by the sculptor Anton Pruska.

== Deeds ==
Widenmayer's term of office was marked by the rapid increase in the population in the course of industrialisation. His short period of office included the reform of the city's elementary schools, the construction of the alluvial sewage system, the incorporation of Schwabing, Bogenhausen and Neuhausen in 1890 and the founding of the market Wiener Markt.

== Honors ==
Just three years after his death, the street Äußere Isarstraße in Munich, which had just begun to become a magnificent avenue, was renamed Widenmayerstraße in his honour.

== Literature (in German) ==
- Helge Dvorak: Biographisches Lexikon der Deutschen Burschenschaft. Band I: Politiker. Teilband 6: T–Z. Winter, Heidelberg 2005, ISBN 3-8253-5063-0, S. 290.
