= Rama dama =

Organized public space cleanup in Bavaria

Rama dama or ramadama (Bavarian: "We are cleaning!" from German: Räumen tun wir!) is a volunteer cleanup movement in Bavaria, collecting waste from urban and natural public spaces. The organization is run by communities, schools, associations and citizens' initiatives.

Thomas Wimmer, the then-Mayor of Munich, called for people to "rama dama" for the first time on 29 October 1949, addressing the damage done to the city during the Second World War. More than 7500 volunteers joined the project, with Wimmer working with a shovel. In total, more than 15,000 cubic meters of rubble were collected that day. The term remained as designation for common, honorary tidying up.
