= Thomas Wimmer (politician) =

Thomas Wimmer (Siglfing 7 January 1887 – Munich 18 January 1964) was a Bavarian SPD politician. He was mayor of Munich from 1948 to 1960.

== See also ==
- Rama dama

Political offices
Preceded by Karl Scharnagl	Mayor of Munich; 1948–1960	Succeeded by Hans-Jochen Vogel
