= Franz Paul von Mittermayr =

Bavarian municipal administrator (1766 – 1836)

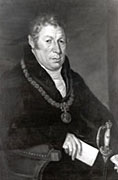

Mayor of Munich
- In office May 1818 – 6 July 1836
- Preceded by: Office established
- Succeeded by: Josef von Teng

Personal details
- Born: 2 April 1766
- Died: July 6, 1836 (aged 70)

Franz Paul von Mittermayr (2 April 1766 – 6 July 1836) was a royal Bavarian municipal administrator who served as the first Mayor of Munich from 1818 until his death in 1836.

== Biography ==
Mittermayr received an education at the Polling Abbey. In 1791, he elected to join the council of the Munich magistrate, which at the time was the administrative council of Munich. In 1804, Mittermayr was appointed mayor for life. In 1810, the magistrate system was abandoned and he was appointed municipal administrator of Munich. From May 1818 until his death in 1836 Mittermayr was the first Mayor of Munich. As Mayor, he promoted infrastructure projects and was extremely loyal to King Maximilian I Joseph.
