= Gegen Vergessen – Für Demokratie =

- Formation: 1993
- Type: NGO
- Purpose: Civic education
- Headquarters: Berlin
- Chairman: Bernd Faulenbach
- President of the Advisory Council: Rita Süssmuth
- Executive Director: Michael Parak
- Website: http://www.gegen-vergessen.de

Gegen Vergessen – Für Demokratie (Against Oblivion – For Democracy) is a German organization promoting diversity, tolerance and democratic participation, and opposing racism, prejudice and right-wing and left-wing extremism. It focuses in particular on the two dictatorships on German soil, the Nazi dictatorship and the communist dictatorship of East Germany. The organization was founded in 1993 and is headquartered in Berlin. Its activities are supported by the Government of Germany.

The organization was co-founded after the German reunification by former SPD chairman Hans-Jochen Vogel, Annemarie Renger, Jürgen Burckhardt, Manfred Struck and Freimut Duve, who all belonged to the SPD. Its current chairman is Joachim Gauck (since 2003), the deputy chairmen are Eberhard Diepgen, Bernd Faulenbach and Cornelia Schmalz-Jacobsen. The advisory council is chaired by Rita Süssmuth, and the Executive Director is Michael Parak.

The first chairman was Hans-Jochen Vogel (1993–2000), who was succeeded by former Bremen mayor Hans Koschnick (2000–2003).

Hans Bonkas, an honorary member of Gegen Vergessen – Für Demokratie, was active in the resistance against both the Nazis and the SED regime and spent seven years in an East German jail, and joined the Reichsbanner Schwarz-Rot-Gold in 1932.
