= Ludwig Osthelder =

German entomologist (1877–1954)

- Born: November 29, 1877; Frankenthal
- Died: February 9, 1954; Kochel am See
- Education: Ludwig-Maximilians-Universität München
- Known for: President of the governments of the Palatinate and Upper Bavaria
- Scientific career
- Fields: Law, Public administration

Ludwig Osthelder (29 November 1877 – 9 February 1954) was a Bavarian jurist, civil servant and entomologist.

== Biography ==
Born in the Bavarian Palatinate, Ludwig Osthelder studied law at the Ludwig-Maximilians-Universität München in Munich and was a member of the student fraternity Akademischer Gesangverein München within the Sondershäuser Verband (SV).

He entered the Bavarian civil service in 1905. From 1914 to 1915, he served in the First World War. In 1920, he was promoted to Oberregierungsrat (senior government councillor), and appointed as Ministerialrat (ministerial councillor) in 1923 with responsibility for legal affairs concerning public and vocational schools. In 1932, he became President of the Government of the Palatinate. With the Nazi seizure of power in 1933, he was placed into provisional retirement and returned to Munich. From 1943 he lived in Kochel.

On 23 May 1945 he was appointed by Munich’s lord mayor Karl Scharnagl as President of the Government of Upper Bavaria, and this appointment was confirmed by the Allied Military Government on 24 May. He retired on 31 December 1948. Osthelder died in 1954 in Kochel am See.

Between 1919/20 and 1922 Osthelder was a member of the Bavarian People's Party (BVP). From 1949 to 1951 he served as chairman of the Munich Entomological Society and also chaired the Association of Palatines in Right-Bank Bavaria, founded in Munich in 1949.

Osthelder was the great-grandfather of Christian Freiherr von Mauchenheim gen. Bechtolsheim, an investment manager and ambassador of the Sovereign Military Order of Malta.
