= Ethmia iranella =

Scientific classification
- Kingdom: Animalia
- Phylum: Arthropoda
- Clade: Pancrustacea
- Class: Insecta
- Order: Lepidoptera
- Family: Depressariidae
- Genus: Ethmia
- Species: E. iranella

Binomial name
- Ethmia iranella Zerny, 1940

Synonyms
- Ethmia bipunctella iranella Zerny, 1940

Species of moth

Ethmia iranella is a moth in the family Depressariidae. It has been recorded from Asia Minor, Syria, Iran, Spain, (Note: where it is known from three specimens: one male collected from Valencia in 1960 and two females collected from Granada in 1957 and 1962 respectively.) Portugal, Hungary, Romania, Greece and southern Russia. It has recently been recorded from France and Italy.

The species was first described as a subspecies of Ethmia bipunctella, with type locality Elburs, Iran. It was later recognized as valid, separate species with a wider distribution.

The host-plant or host-plants of this species are not yet known, but Boraginaceae is likely.
