= Jakob Bauer =

Bavarian politician (1787 – 1854)

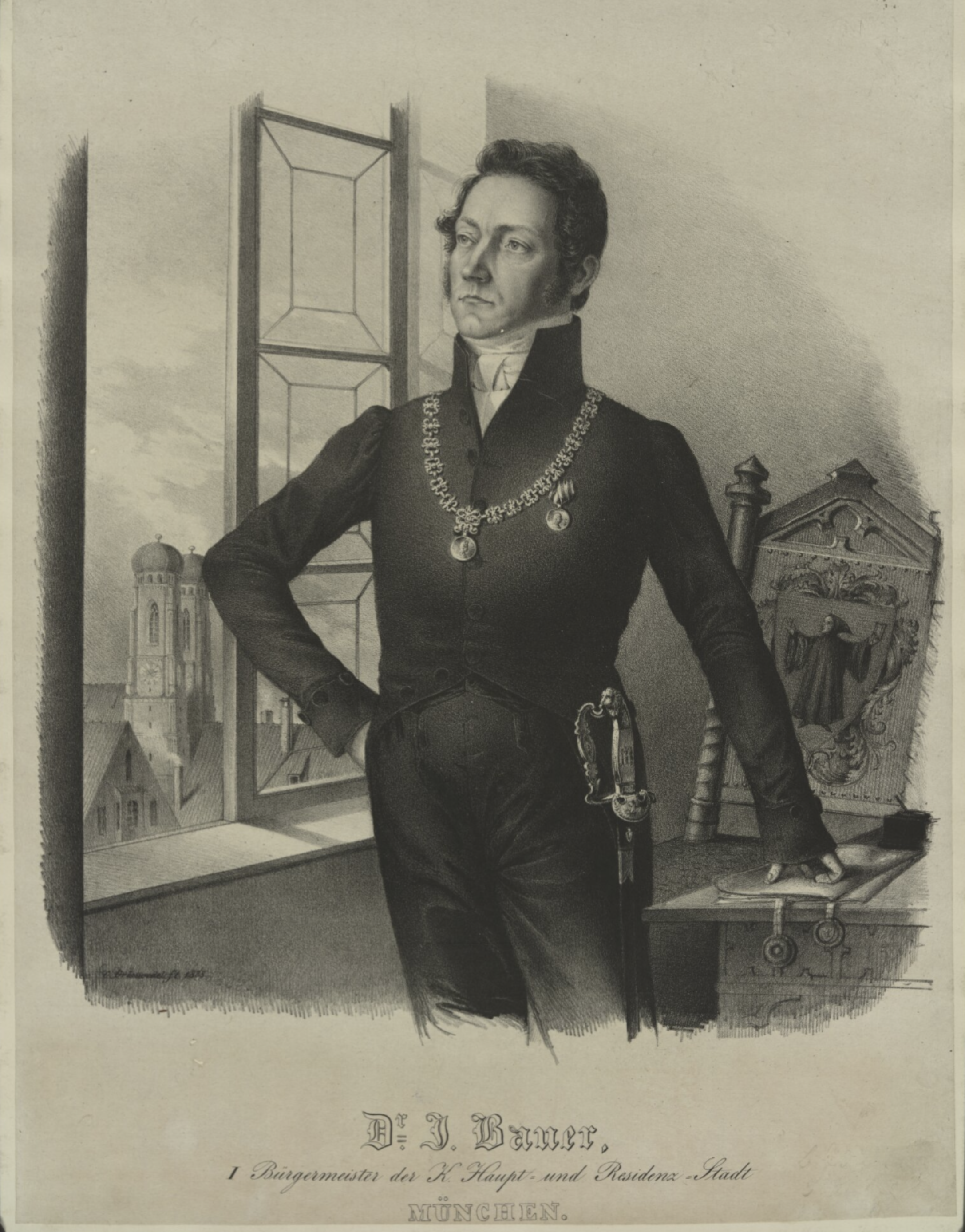
- Bauer c. 1838

Mayor of Munich
- In office 22 January 1838 – 5 August 1854
- Preceded by: Josef von Teng
- Succeeded by: Kaspar von Steinsdorf

Personal details
- Born: 19 December 1787 Hirschau, Kingdom of Bavaria, modern day Germany
- Died: August 5, 1854 (aged 66)

Jakob von Bauer (19 December 1787 – 5 August 1854) was a politician in the Kingdom of Bavaria who served as the third Mayor of Munich from 1838 until his death in 1854.

== Biography ==
On 22 January 1838, the municipal council of Munich elected him as mayor. He ordered the development of the Flaucheranlagen in the Flaucher area in Munich. Bauer's main priority during his mayoralty was curbing the economic crisis which had developed under his predecessor. He died in 1854.
