= Hans-Jochen Vogel =

German lawyer and politician (1926–2020)

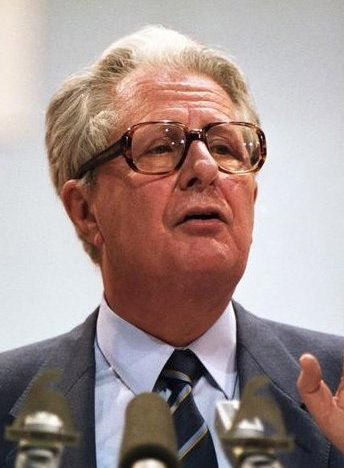
- Vogel in 1988

Leader of the Social Democratic Party
- In office 14 June 1987 – 29 May 1991
- Federal Manager: Peter Glotz; Anke Fuchs
- Preceded by: Willy Brandt
- Succeeded by: Björn Engholm

Leader of the Social Democratic Party in the Bundestag
- In office 8 March 1983 – 12 November 1991
- Preceded by: Herbert Wehner
- Succeeded by: Hans-Ulrich Klose

Governing Mayor of West Berlin
- In office 23 January 1981 – 11 June 1981
- Mayor: Guido Brunner
- Preceded by: Dietrich Stobbe
- Succeeded by: Richard von Weizsäcker

Minister of Justice
- In office 16 May 1974 – 22 January 1981
- Chancellor: Helmut Schmidt
- Preceded by: Gerhard Jahn
- Succeeded by: Jürgen Schmude

Minister of Regional Planning, Construction and Urban Development
- In office 15 December 1972 – 16 May 1974
- Chancellor: Willy Brandt
- Preceded by: Lauritz Lauritzen
- Succeeded by: Karl Ravens

Mayor of Munich
- In office 27 March 1960 – 11 June 1972
- Preceded by: Thomas Wimmer
- Succeeded by: Georg Kronawitter
Parliamentary constituencies
Member of the Bundestag; from Berlin
In office 29 March 1983 – 10 November 1994
| Constituency | State list |
Member of the Bundestag; from Bavaria
In office 12 December 1972 – 28 January 1981
| Preceded by | Kurt Ueberschär |
| Succeeded by | Multi-member district |
| Constituency | State list (1972–1976); Munich North (1976–1981) |
Member of the; Abgeordnetenhaus of Berlin; for Neukölln 3
In office 26 April 1979 – 26 April 1983
| Preceded by | Manfred Twehle |
| Succeeded by | Hans Ludwig Schoenthal |

Personal details
- Born: 3 February 1926 Göttingen, Germany
- Died: 26 July 2020 (aged 94) Munich, Germany
- Party: Social Democratic (1950–2020)
- Spouse: Liselotte Vogel (m. 1972)
- Children: 3
- Relatives: Bernhard Vogel (brother)
- Education: LMU Munich
- Occupation: Politician; Jurist; Civil Servant

Hans-Jochen Vogel (German: [hans ˈjɔxn̩ ˈfoːɡl̩]; 3 February 1926 – 26 July 2020) was a German lawyer and a politician for the Social Democratic Party (SPD). He served as Mayor of Munich from 1960 to 1972, winning the 1972 Summer Olympics for the city and Governing Mayor of West Berlin in 1981, the only German to ever lead two cities with over one million inhabitants each. He was Federal Minister of Regional Planning, Construction and Urban Development from 1972 to 1974, and Federal Minister of Justice from 1974 to 1981. He served as leader of the SPD in the Bundestag from 1983 to 1991, and as Leader of the Social Democratic Party from 1987 to 1991. In 1993, he co-founded the organisation Gegen Vergessen – Für Demokratie (Against Oblivion – For Democracy). He was a member of the National Ethics Council of Germany from its beginning in 2001.

== Early life and professional career ==
Vogel was born in Göttingen in the Province of Hanover, Germany on 3 February 1926. He attended the Max-Planck-Gymnasium in Göttingen, and from 1935 the Landgraf-Ludwig-Gymnasium in Gießen, Hesse where he achieved the Abitur in 1943. He was an active Catholic and joined the Hitler Youth and even became one of its squad leaders (Scharführer). He was not critical of the Nazi regime and later recalled:

"… in spite of all my doubts about details it did not occur to me at the time that you can, or even must, resist the State. Especially if I consider the biographies of other young people, for instance, Sophie and Hans Scholl, who came to completely different conclusions. I lived with my parents in Gießen then, I saw the synagogue burn. And nobody helped, on the contrary, the police and the firebrigade made the fire even worse. But not even that really opened my eyes."

Vogel volunteered for service in the German Army (Wehrmacht) in July 1943, aged 17, in the latter stages of World War II. Twice wounded at the Italian Front, Vogel was an Unteroffizier at the end of the war, when he was captured by the Americans. On his return from prison camp he worked as a transport worker for a short while, before he was able to study law at Marburg University and the Ludwig-Maximilians-Universität München. He received his doctorate ("magna cum laude") in 1950.

His professional career began in February 1952, when he became a junior official (Assessor) in the Ministry of Justice of Bavaria. At the age of 28 he was a county court judge, and in the following year he was appointed chairman of a commission in the Bavarian Minister-President's office which was to review Bavarian law for a new survey published by the Bavarian state parliament. The Munich City Council made him their legal secretary (Rechtsreferent) in 1958.

== Political career ==
=== Mayor in Munich ===
Vogel became a member of the Social Democratic Party of Germany (SPD) in 1950. At age 34, he was elected Mayor of Munich on 27 March 1960, with 64.3% of the vote, then the youngest mayor of a city in Europe with more than a million inhabitants. His popularity increased further, partly due to his success in tackling the city's traffic problems, and he was re-elected in 1966 with 77.9%. The fact that Munich was chosen as the venue of the 1972 Summer Olympics, which had additional beneficial effects on town planning and traffic projects, was to a large extent a result of his efforts.

When Vogel became the leader of the Bavarian Social Democrats and also a member of the executive of the Social Democratic Party of Germany in 1972, he resigned as Mayor of Munich, succeeded by Georg Kronawitter. He described his Munich years in his book Die Amtskette ("The Chain of Office"), which was published in the same year.

In the Federal Elections of 19 November 1972, Vogel was the top candidate of the Bavarian SPD; two years later he was the SPD's top candidate in the elections for the Bavarian State Parliament. Whereas he could not prevent a victory of the Christian Social Union of Bavaria (CSU), he personally gained the best result for any SPD politician in Bavaria after the Second World War.

=== Minister in Bonn ===
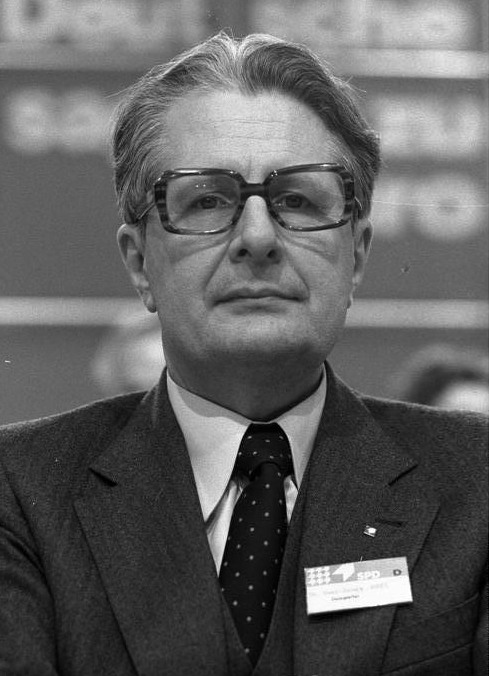
Vogel on a SPD Parteitag in 1978

In December 1972, Chancellor Willy Brandt made Vogel Federal Minister of Regional Planning, Construction and Urban Development; Brandt's successor, Helmut Schmidt, made him Minister of Justice in 1974.

=== Mayor in Berlin ===
A new challenge came in 1981 when Dietrich Stobbe stepped down as Mayor of West Berlin, and Vogel was asked to be his successor and take charge of a deeply divided Berlin SPD. He created a unique "Berlin way" (Neue Berliner Linie) of dealing with the problem of "squats" (Hausbesetungen) by granting contracts to the squatters, while preventing any new squats at the same time. Although he managed to successfully deal with his party's difficulties to a large extent, the SPD lost the following West Berlin elections, only a few months after Vogel had taken office. Governing Mayor of West Berlin became Richard von Weizsäcker (CDU), the later President of Germany. During the following year, Vogel led the opposition in the West Berlin parliament.

=== Party leader ===
Vogel became the SPD's top candidate for the federal elections on 6 March 1983, filling in for Helmut Schmidt, who had been toppled as chancellor by the CDU leader, Helmut Kohl. His campaign focused on disarmament and the problems of the labour market (Arbeitsmarkt), but Kohl won the elections.

After the elections, Vogel was one of Berlin's members of the German parliament, Bundestag. Herbert Wehner, the previous leader of the parliamentary SPD, nominated him as his successor, and Vogel held that office until 1991. Under his leadership the Parliamentary SPD turned against atomic energy after the Chernobyl disaster of 1986.

From 1987 to 1991 Vogel was also the leader of the SPD. He was a member of the Bundestag until 1994. "I've never pushed myself into the foreground", he said of himself.

=== Career after political posts ===
After 1994, Vogel withdrew from political posts, but he continued as a member of the organisation Gegen Vergessen – Für Demokratie (Against Oblivion – For Democracy), aimed at spreading basic democratic values, as a contrast to Nazi Germany and East German concept. Vogel was one of its founders in 1993, and its first chairman. He served as chairman until 2000.

From the beginning in 2001 to 2005, Vogel belonged to the National Ethics Council of Germany, looking at ethical aspects such as biotechnology and its consequences for individuals and society.

== Awards ==
Vogel was awarded the Grand Cross 1st class of the Order of Merit of the Federal Republic of Germany in 1986. He received the Heinz Galinsky Prize for promoting a better understanding between the Jewish community in Berlin and its social surroundings in 1998. In 2001 he won the Leo Baeck Prize, the highest award of the Central Council of Jews in Germany.

== Personal characteristics and private life ==
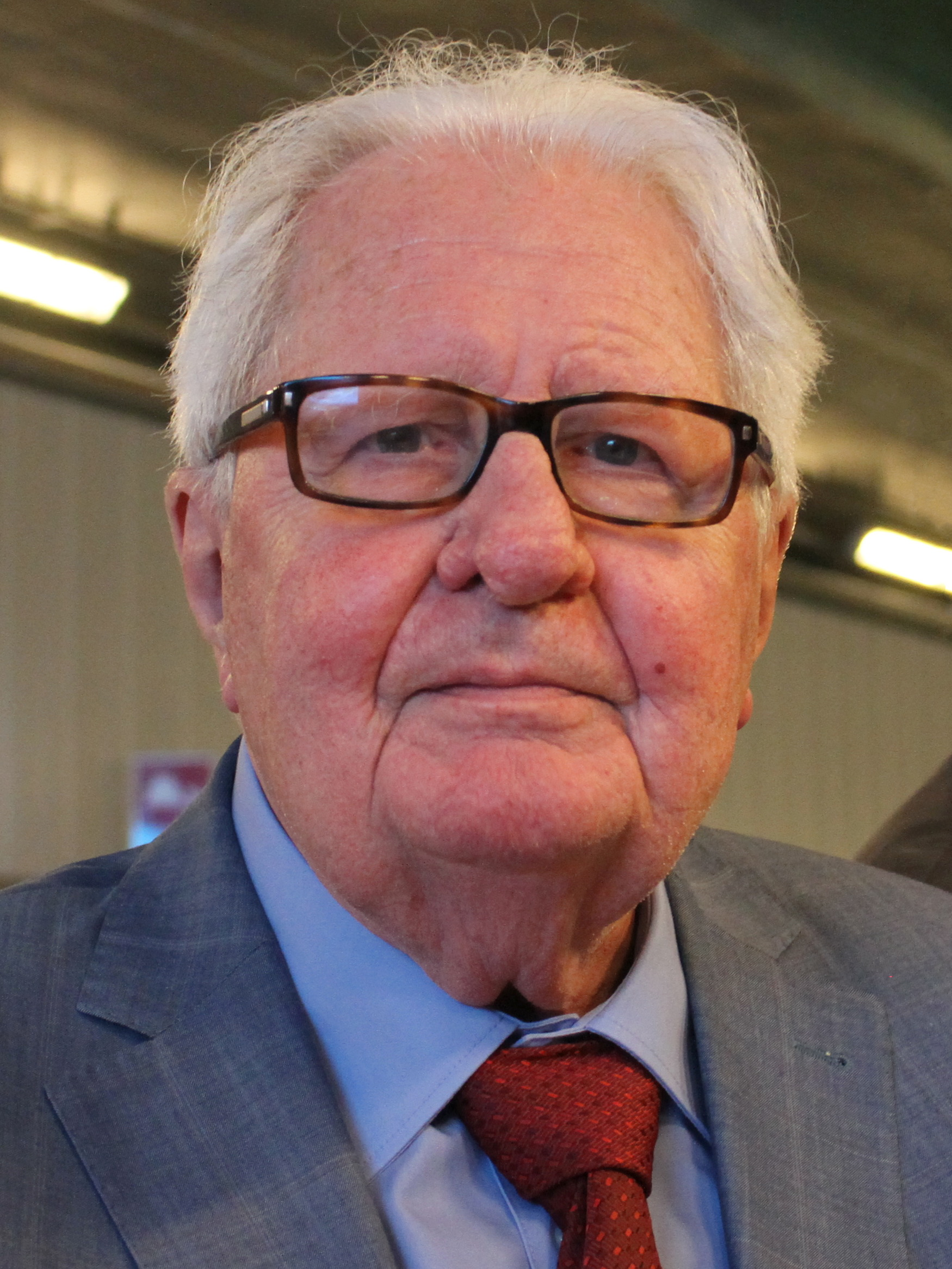
Vogel in 2015

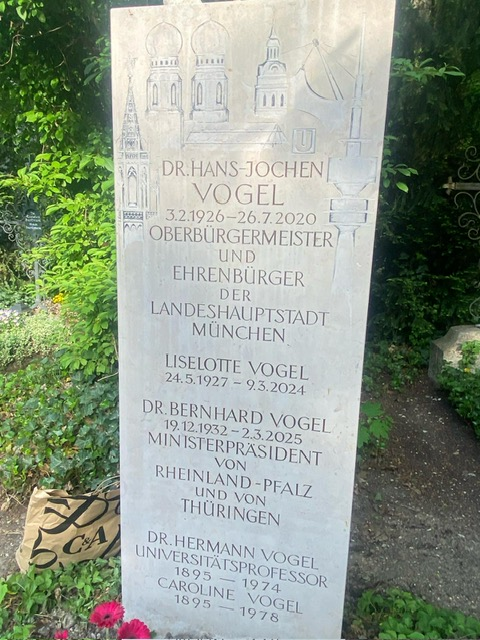
The gravestone of Hans-Jochen Vogel with his wife Liselotte, who died in 2024, his brother Bernhard Vogel, who died in 2025, and his parents in Munich

Originally on the right wing of the SPD, Vogel became more and more liberal in his views, for instance, with regard to the legislation about asylum seekers, referendums, or the protection of personal data (Datenschutz) from the state. In 1992, he visited twelve successor states of the former Soviet Union, meeting numerous presidents, ministers, but also leaders of the opposition, of the Orthodox Church, and of Islam, which broadened his outlook.

In his party, Vogel was a mediator between the various wings, and a centre of integration. He was open to seeking co-operation with the other parties. As the chairman of his party's delegates in a parliamentary commission for reviewing the Constitution, he achieved the inclusion of the principles of the protection of the environment and of the promotion of women in society. In his final speech in parliament, he said that he would have liked to see a better representation of East German values in the German Constitution after unification.

Vogel summed up his political attitude: "I am a Social Democrat who would like to reconcile something of a vision with the rather stringent and inexorable knowledge that politics cannot be conducted with clouds of words, but with solid work and craftsmanship."

Vogel was the elder brother of CDU politician Bernhard Vogel. In 1949, he married his first wife, Ilse, and the couple had three children. They were divorced in 1971. He married his second wife, Liselotte, in 1972. They moved to a senior citizen's home in 2006. In 2014, Vogel announced that he had Parkinson's disease which had been diagnosed two years prior. He died in Munich on 26 July 2020 at the age of 94.

Party political offices
| Preceded by Willy Brandt | Chairman of the Social Democratic Party of Germany; 1987–1991 | Succeeded by Björn Engholm |
Political offices
| Preceded by Dietrich Stobbe | Mayor of West Berlin; 1981 | Succeeded by Richard von Weizsäcker |
| Preceded by Thomas Wimmer | Mayor of Munich; 1960–1972 | Succeeded by Georg Kronawitter |
Sporting positions
| Preceded by (Mexico) Pedro Ramírez Vázquez | President of Organizing Committee for Summer Olympic Games; 1972 | Succeeded by (Canada) Jean Doré |
