= Christian Ude =

German politician

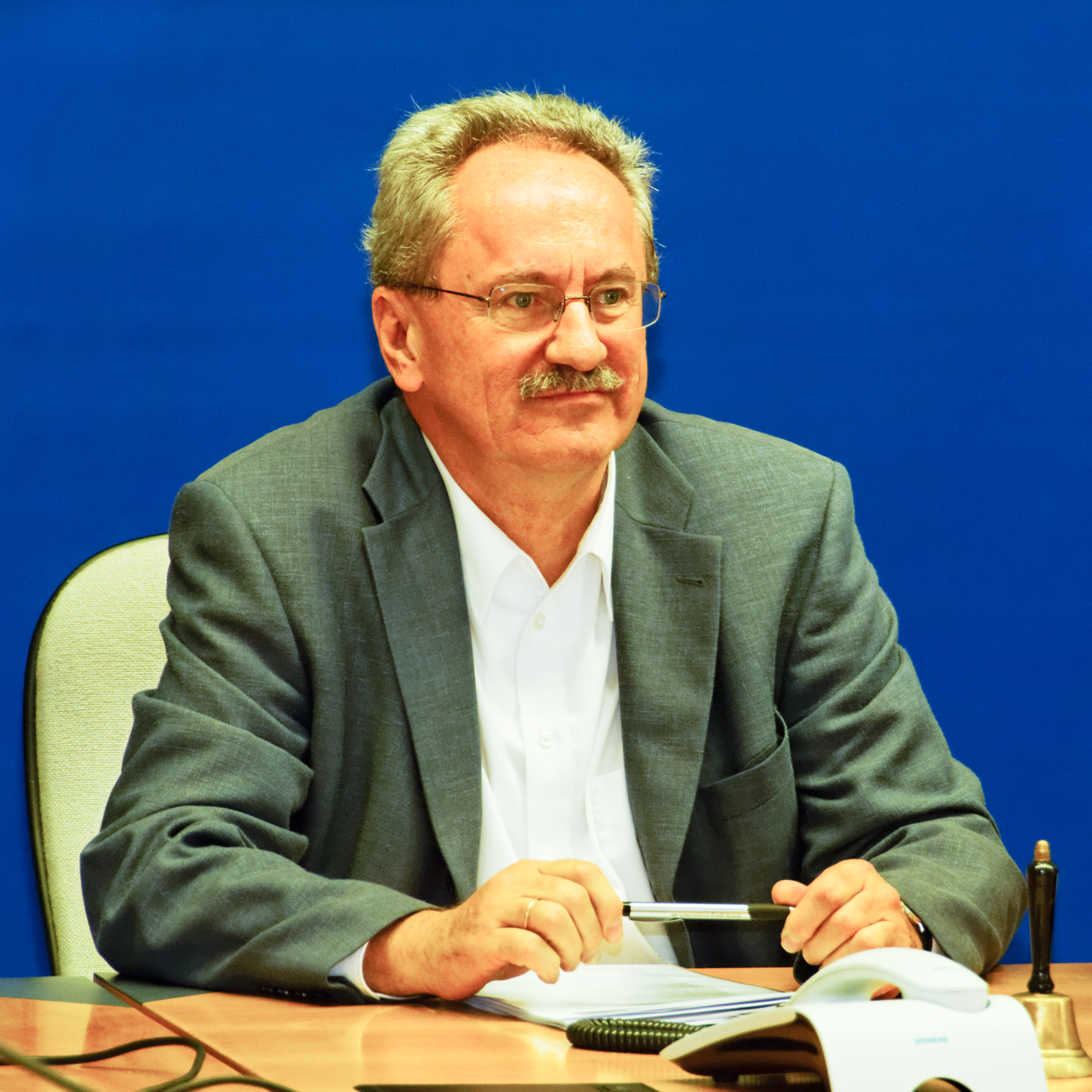
- Ude in 2012

Mayor of Munich
- In office 12 September 1993 – 30 April 2014
- Preceded by: Georg Kronawitter
- Succeeded by: Dieter Reiter

Deputy Mayor of Munich
- In office 2 May 1990 – 11 September 1993

Personal details
- Born: 26 October 1947 (age 78) Munich, Bavaria, Germany
- Party: Social Democratic Party
- Spouse: Edith von Welser-Ude
- Children: 6

Christian Ude (born 26 October 1947) is a German politician who served as mayor of Munich from 1993 to 2014. He is a member of the Social Democratic Party of Germany (SPD).

== Career ==
Ude was born in Munich, the son of journalist and author Karl Ude and his Swiss-born wife, Renée Madeleine, née Guggisberg. From 1967 to 1969 he worked for the daily newspaper Süddeutsche Zeitung. He studied legal science in Munich 1969-1977. From 1979 to 1990 he worked as a lawyer.

He was elected as deputy mayor of Munich on 2 May 1990, two months after he was elected into the city council of Munich.

On 12 September 1993, Ude was elected as lord mayor and successor of Georg Kronawitter. He was re-elected three times, on 13 June 1999 with 61.2 per cent of all votes, on 3 March 2002 with 64.5 per cent and on 2 March 2008 with 66.8 per cent. In August 2011 Christian Ude announced his intention to become the SPD's leading candidate for the upcoming Bavarian state election in 2013.

== Personal life ==
In addition to his position as lord mayor, Ude is also a political cabaret artist. Ude has been married to Edith von Welser-Ude (*1939) since 1983, it is his first and her second marriage.

== Other activities ==
Additionally, Ude was a member of the board of directors of the 1860 Munich until 2009.

In 2005, he was elected to the post of President of the German cities association.

There is a "Culture and Education Center" named after Christian Ude in Tunceli, Pülümür. Construction started in 2007 with a ceremony with his participation. At the same time, he is an honorary member of Pülümür.

== Bibliography ==
- Asta Schreib: Christian Ude. (in German). (MünchenPortrait; 1) München, München-Verlag 2007, ISBN 978-3-937090-22-1.

Political offices
Preceded by Georg Kronawitter	Mayor of Munich; 1993–2014	Succeeded by Dieter Reiter
