= Josef von Teng =

Bavarian politician (1786 – 1837)

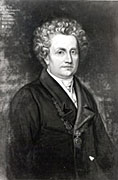

Mayor of Munich
- In office 6 July 1836 – 7 December 1837
- Preceded by: Franz Paul von Mittermayr
- Succeeded by: Jakob Bauer

Personal details
- Born: 29 August 1786
- Died: July 2, 1837 (aged 50)

Josef von Teng (29 August 1786 – 7 December 1837) was a Bavarian politician who served as the second Mayor of Munich from 1836 until his death a year later in 1837.

== Mayor of Munich ==
Upon the death of his predecessor, Franz Paul von Mittermayr in 1836, Teng was chosen to be the new Mayor of Munich, despite being ill. He would die in 1837, after only a year as Mayor. His mayoralty was marked by a financial crisis that began before he became Mayor. In an attempt to curb the crisis, he increased taxes substantially.
