= List of mayors of Munich =

Mayor of Munich
- Coat of arms of Munich

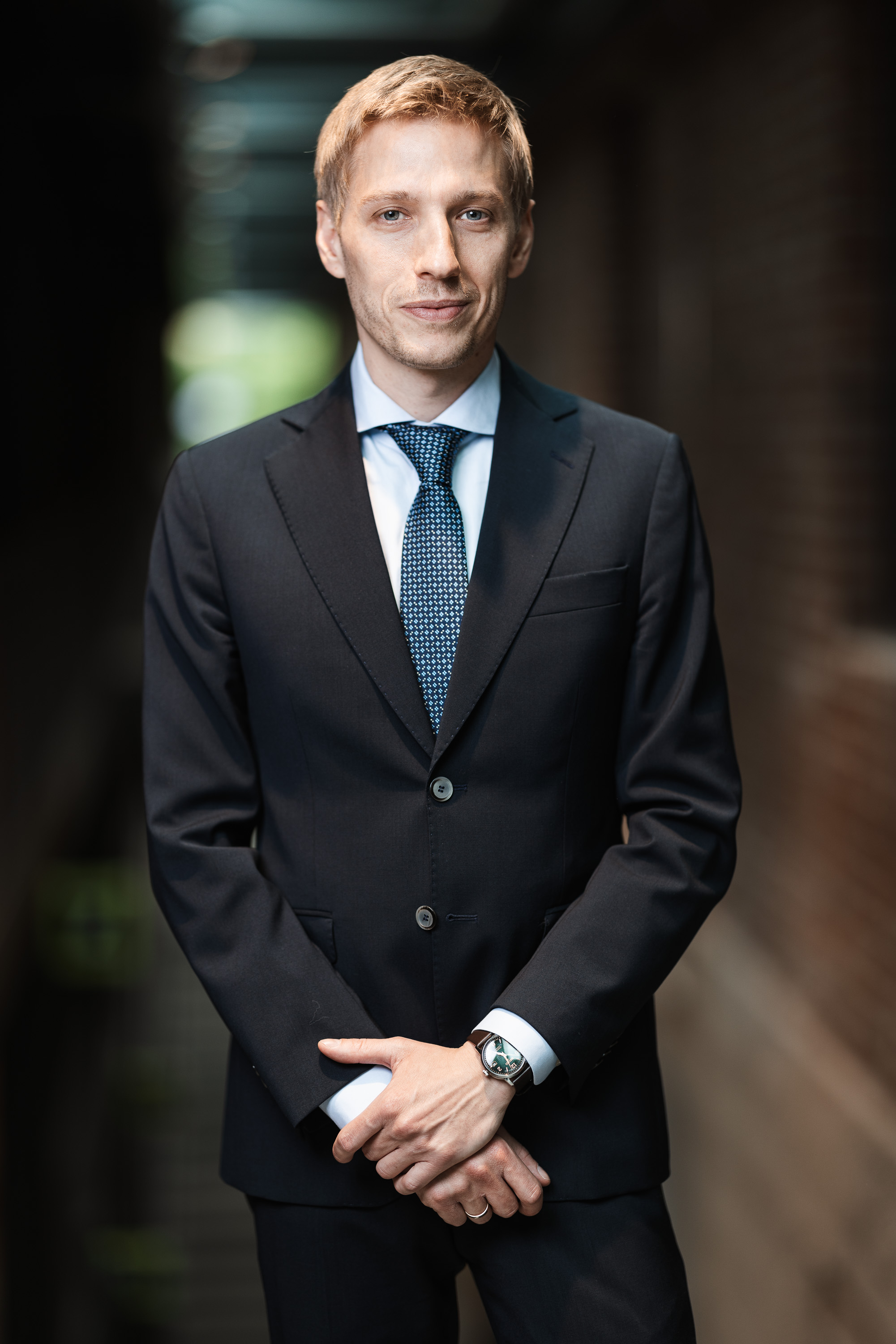
- Incumbent; Dominik Krause since 1 May 2026
- Inaugural holder: Franz Paul von Mittermayr
- Formation: 1818
- Website: https://www.muenchen.de

This is a list of mayors of Munich since 1818.

== Kingdom of Bavaria ==
Name	Picture	Term	Party	2. Bürgermeister
Franz Paul von Mittermayr		1818–1836		Joseph von Utzschneider (1818–1823); Jakob Klar (1823–1833); Josef von Teng (1833–1836)
Josef von Teng		1836–1837		Vacant / Handled by Magistracy
Jakob Bauer		1838–1854		Kaspar von Steinsdorf (1837–1854)
Kaspar von Steinsdorf		1854–1870	Non-partisan	Anton von Widder (1854–1870)
Alois von Erhardt		1870–1887	DFP	Johannes von Widenmayer (1870–1888)
Johannes von Widenmayer		1888–1893		Wilhelm Georg von Borscht (1888–1893)
Wilhelm Georg von Borscht		1893–1919	Zentrum	Dr. Philipp Brunner (1893–1914); Dr. Otto Merkt (1914–1917)

== Free State of Bavaria ==
Name	Picture	Term	Party
Eduard Schmid		1919–1924	SPD
Karl Scharnagl		1924–1933	BVP
Karl Fiehler		1933–1945	NSDAP
Karl Scharnagl		1945–1948	CSU
Thomas Wimmer		1948–1960	SPD
Hans-Jochen Vogel		1960–1972	SPD
Georg Kronawitter		1972–1978	SPD
Erich Kiesl		1978–1984	CSU
Georg Kronawitter		1984–1993	SPD
Christian Ude		1993–2014	SPD
Dieter Reiter		2014–2026	SPD
Dominik Krause		2026–present	Greens

== See also ==
- Munich
- Timeline of Munich
