= Eduard Schmid =

Mayor of Munich from 1919 to 1924

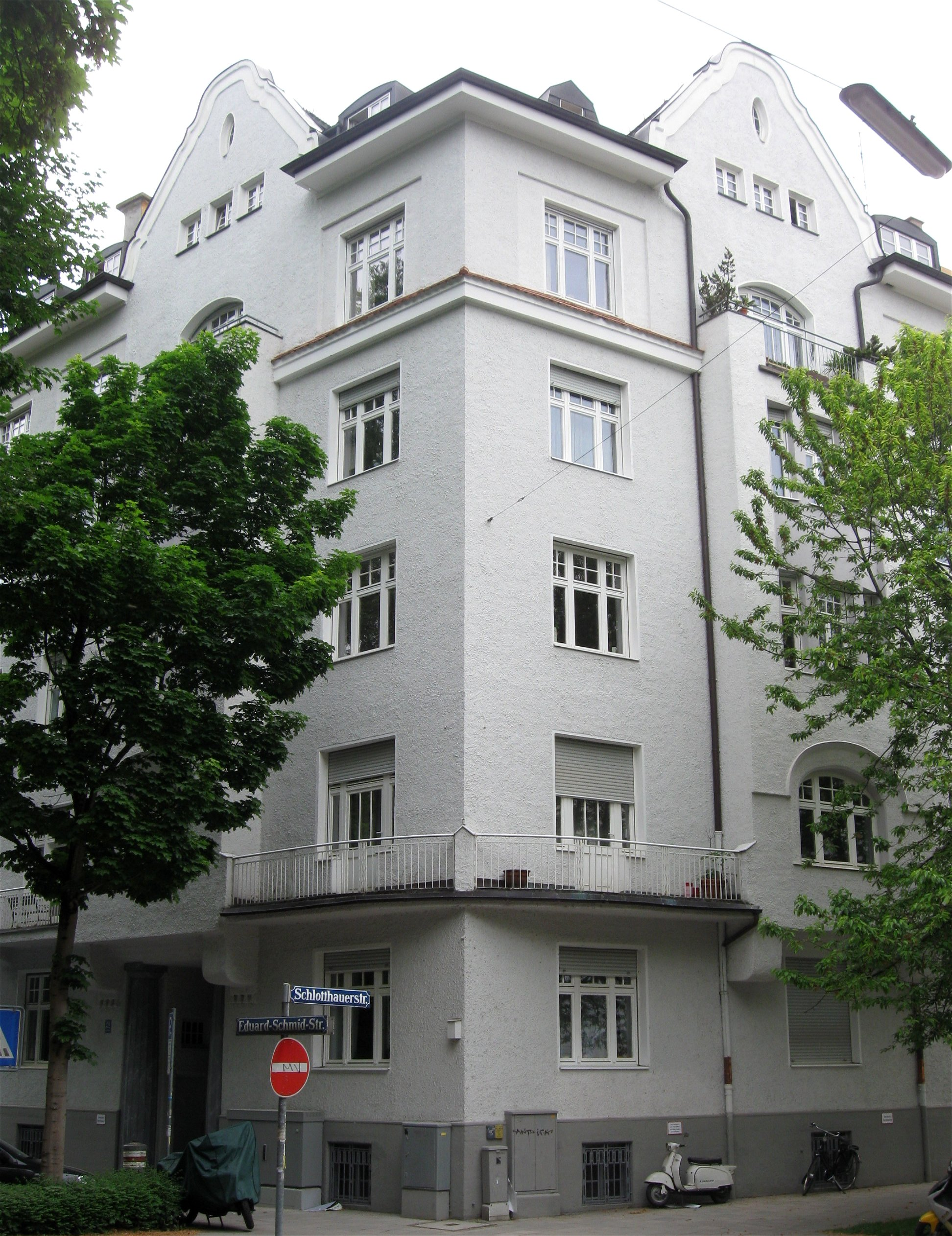
Eduard-Schmid-Straße

Eduard Schmid (born October 15, 1861 in Ostrach, Province of Hohenzollern, Kingdom of Prussia, died 8 June 1933 in Munich) was Lord Mayor of Munich from 1919 to 1924. He was the first SPD politician to hold this position.

== Apprenticeship and work as an editor ==
A joiner by trade, after his apprenticeship Schmid spent a few years as journeyman until he settled in Munich, where he became a member of the Deutscher Holzarbeiterverband (German Wood Workers Association). He also worked as an editor for the SPD affiliated newspaper Münchener Post.

== Political career ==
In 1899 Schmid became the first Social Democrat member of the City of Munich Magistrate. In 1907 he became member of the Second Chamber of the Bavarian Parliament. In a time of severe domestic disputes, a few weeks after the defeat of the Bavarian Council Republic, Schmid was elected to Lord Mayor of Munich on 26 June 1919, in which he became the first Social Democrat to hold the highest position in the city until 1924. Living conditions in Munich were determined at that time by strikes, hunger, economic difficulties, unemployment and party strife.

== Achievements ==
Schmid's tenure was marked by efforts to improve the electricity and water supply. The further expansion of the middle Isar for energy production was initiated by him. Through the purchases of land areas in the source well area of the Taubenberg he secured Munich's water supply. Other major projects which he promoted or initiated were the tram workshop in Perlach and the St. Joseph retirement home in Mittersendling.

== Inflation and arrests by the SA ==
Two unpleasant historical events happened during Schmid’s term in office. In 1923, due to the general economic crisis, the sharp decline in the value of money, resulting in inflation. Because of this many citizens were deprived of their last savings, causing many to fall into a state of misery and despair. The second event was the Beer Hall Putsch in 1923. Schmid was an important social democrat and opponent of Adolf Hitler. On 9 November 1923, he was arrested during the putsch by the SA and barely escaped death by hanging.

== Resignation and Honorary Citizen Award ==
On 31 December 1924 Schmid resigned from his position as First Mayor. On his 70s birthday, on 15 October 1931, he was named the 32nd Honorary Citizen of the City of Munich. A few months after the Nazis’ seizure of power, Schmid died on 8 June 1933 in Munich.

== Literature ==
- Bruno Effinger: "Historische Persönlichkeiten". In: Otto Kasper (Ed.): Der Landkreis Sigmaringen. 1981, Thorbecke, Sigmaringen. p. 281f.

Political offices
Preceded by new office	Mayor of Munich; 1919–1924	Succeeded by Karl Scharnagl
