= Reisdorf, Bavaria =

Reisdorf is a village in the German state of Bavaria, about 25 miles north of Munich. It is part of the municipality of Schweitenkirchen, in the district of Pfaffenhofen.
