= Taubenberg =

Mountain in Germany

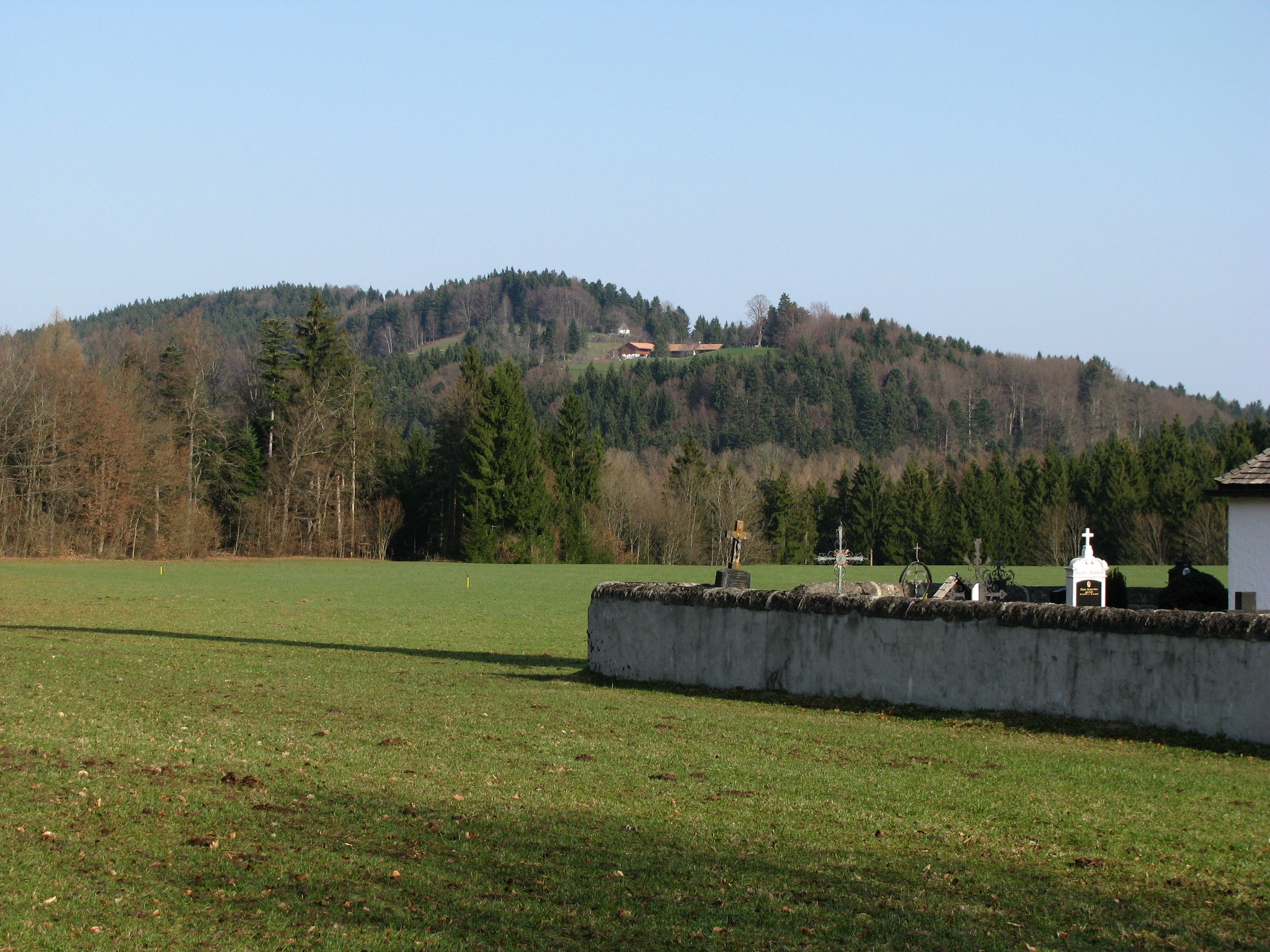
- Taubenberg from Gotzing(German), view from the south east

Highest point
- Elevation: 896 m (2,940 ft)DE-NN
- Coordinates: 47°49′46.74″N 11°45′50.23″E

Geography
- Location: Bavaria, Germany
- Parent range: Bavarian Prealps

Geology
- Rock age: Tertiary
- Rock type: Conglomerate

Taubenberg is a mountain with a height of 896 m amsl and area of 1847 ha in the Warngau municipality in the district of Miesbach in Bavaria, Germany. It is set apart from the Tegernsee mountains of the Bavarian Prealps. It is a popular hiking destination and the most important water supply area of the Bavarian capital Munich. About two-thirds of the mountain is owned by the city of Munich, the rest is freehold of local farmers and foresters.

== Geography ==
Geologically Taubenberg belongs to the Molasse foothills with its characteristic east–west orientation and marks (as, for example, the Hoher Peißenberg ) the northern edge of the Subalpine Molasse(German) in the Bavarian Alpine foothills and thus the geological edge of the Alps. Taubenberg is the result of debris flows of the upper freshwater molasses, which came from the south about 10-15 million years ago - when the Alps were formed. These coarse debris cones now form characteristic mountains in front of the exits of the former tertiary Alpine rivers ( Tischberg{German}, Hoher Peißenberg, Irschenberg and others). Through the ice of later glaciations, they were later left as Buttes from their softer environment of fine sands and acted as icebreakers, separating the ice flows of individual glacier termini.

The distribution of Glacial erratics and the soil horizons in the summit area of the Taubenberg suggest that it was not overshadowed by glaciers in the last, the Würm glaciation, but emerged from the ice as Nunatak.

Taubenberg has a peculiar geomorphology. The highest point is in the west of the ridge. From there, the small Farnbach(German) flows in a valley in the center of the terrain structure to the east and the Mangfall, in which it flows. The valley of the Farnbach divides Taubenberg into a northern and a southern ridge, which are connected to each other in the west. The northern ridge is higher, in its east is the second highest point of the mountain. The southern ridge drops almost equally from west to east. In front of it is the Steinbachtal(German), a broad sloping hollow with fen.
