= Schweitenkirchen =

- Municipality
- Coat of arms

- Location of Schweitenkirchen within Pfaffenhofen a.d.Ilm district
- Interactive map of Schweitenkirchen
- Location within Germany Location within Bavaria
- Coordinates: 48°30′N 11°37′E
- Country: Germany
- State: Bavaria
- Admin. region: Oberbayern
- District: Pfaffenhofen a.d.Ilm

Government
  - Mayor (2020–26): Josef Heigenhauser (CSU)

Area
  - Total: 53 km^{2} (20 sq mi)
- Elevation: 533 m (1,749 ft)

Population (2025-12-31)
  - Total: 5,595
  - Density: 110/km^{2} (270/sq mi)
- Time zone: UTC+01:00 (CET)
  - Summer (DST): UTC+02:00 (CEST)
- Postal codes: 85301
- Dialling codes: 08444
- Vehicle registration: PAF
- Website: www.schweitenkirchen.de

Schweitenkirchen (German pronunciation: [ʃvaɪtn̩ˈkɪʁçn̩]) is a municipality in the district of Pfaffenhofen in Bavaria in Germany.

== See also ==
- Reisdorf
