= Karl Scharnagl =

German politician

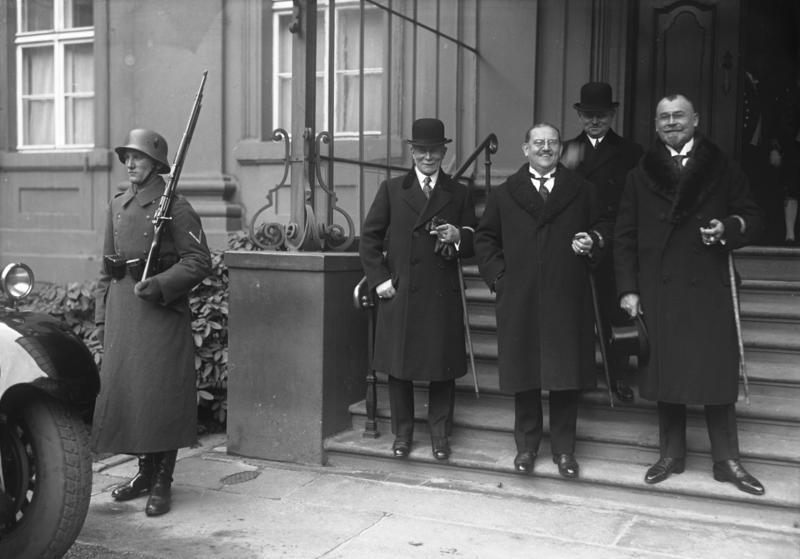
Karl Scharnagl (middle) 1930 at Reich Chancellery in Berlin

Karl Scharnagl (born 17 January 1881 in Munich; died 6 April 1963 in Munich) was a German politician. He was Lord Mayor of Munich from 1925 to 1933 and again from 1945 to 1948, and in 1945 he co-founded the Christian Social Union in Bavaria (CSU).

== Life ==
Scharnagl first learned bakery and confectionery trades in the family business, but showed interest in a political career at an early age. His brother Anton Scharnagl was a clergyman. In 1911, at just 30 years of age, he was a deputy of the Center Party in the second chamber of the Bavarian Parliament. In 1918, after breaking off from the Centre Party, he was a member of the Bavarian People's Party, where he was a member of Parliament through two election periods 1920–1924 and 1928–1932. In 1917, he was also in the select committee of the Bavarian Association of the German Fatherland Party.

== 1919 to 1945 ==
In 1919, Scharnagl was elected to the city council of Munich, 1925 vice mayor and in 1926 he was elected mayor of the city. As mayor, his attention was given to the expansion of the transport network as well as to housing. After the seizure of power by the Nazi Party in 1933, and after several clashes he resigned in office and returned to his learned profession as a baker.

Although he was not involved in the failed assassination attempt of 20 July 1944, Scharnagl was arrested and detained in the Dachau concentration camp. After the liberation of the camp and the subsequent surrender of the German Wehrmacht, Scharnagl was placed by the US armed forces in May 1945 in the position as mayor of Munich. Together with Karl Meitinger he played an important role in the historicist reconstruction of the city center ("Scharnagl Plan") and was the initiator of the "Kulturbaufonds" Munich. To commemorate his plans for a traffic circle, a section of Altstadtring was named after him.

== After 1945 ==
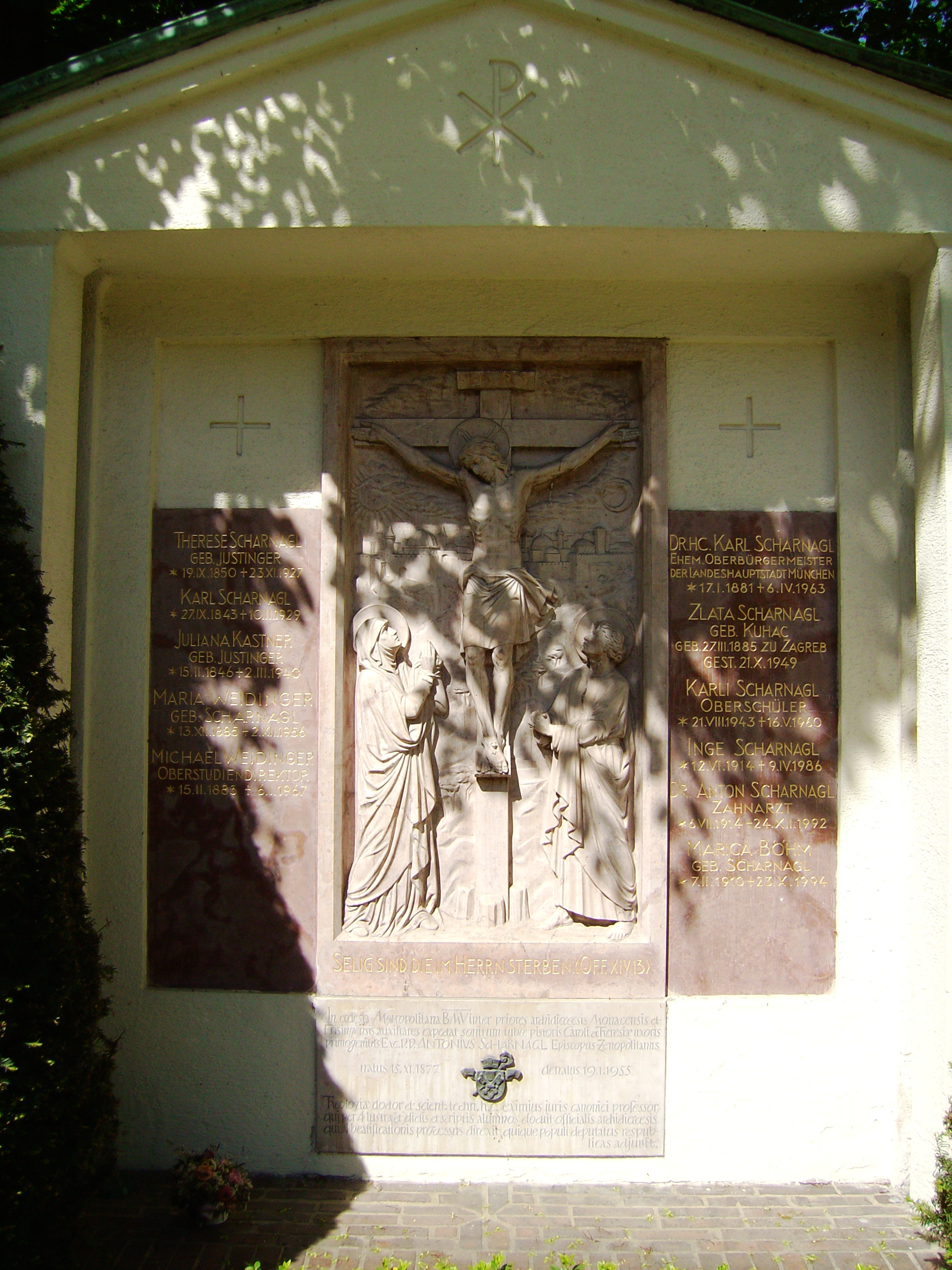
Grave of Karl Scharnagl, Ostfriedhof, Munich

In the summer of 1945 Scharnagl was one of the leaders in the preparations for the founding of the Christian Social Union in Bavaria (CSU). Through his organization, a meeting of twelve persons was held on August 14, which discussed the possibility of establishing a conservative-bourgeois party as a counterweight to the "socialist camp". A committee to prepare the party's founding was used and adopted at a further meeting on September 12, which is considered the actual founding meeting of the CSU, under the name of the Bavarian Christian Social Union. The statewide official founding as Christian Social Union, was on October 13 in Würzburg.

On June 6, 1946 Karl Scharnagl was officially voted in as mayor in his office, but two years later he was defeated by Thomas Wimmer (SPD). He served one year as the second mayor, and then went into retirement in 1949.

On May 22, 1945, Scharnagl received the allowance from the American military government the authority to re-establish the organization of the Red Cross for Bavaria. He called upon Adalbert Prince of Bavaria to become its president. On 1 June 1946 he was elected honorary president of the Bavarian Red Cross (BRK) and on 12 April 1947 he was elected president.

1948 Scharnagl co-founded the Society for Christian-Jewish Cooperation. From 1947 to 1949 he was a member of the Bavarian Senate. He was a member of the Catholic fraternity K.S.St.V. Alemannia Munich, Kartellverband.

On April 6, 1963, Karl Scharnagl died. He was buried in the Ostfriedhof in Munich.

== Literature ==
- Thomas Schlemmer (2005). "Scharnagl, Karl". Neue Deutsche Biographie (in German). Vol. 22. Berlin: Duncker & Humblot. pp. 573–574. (full text online).

Political offices
Preceded by Eduard Schmid	Mayor of Munich; 1924–1933	Succeeded by Karl Fiehler
Preceded by Karl Fiehler	Mayor of Munich; 1945–1948	Succeeded by Thomas Wimmer
