= Hundersingen =

- Ortsteil of Herbertingen
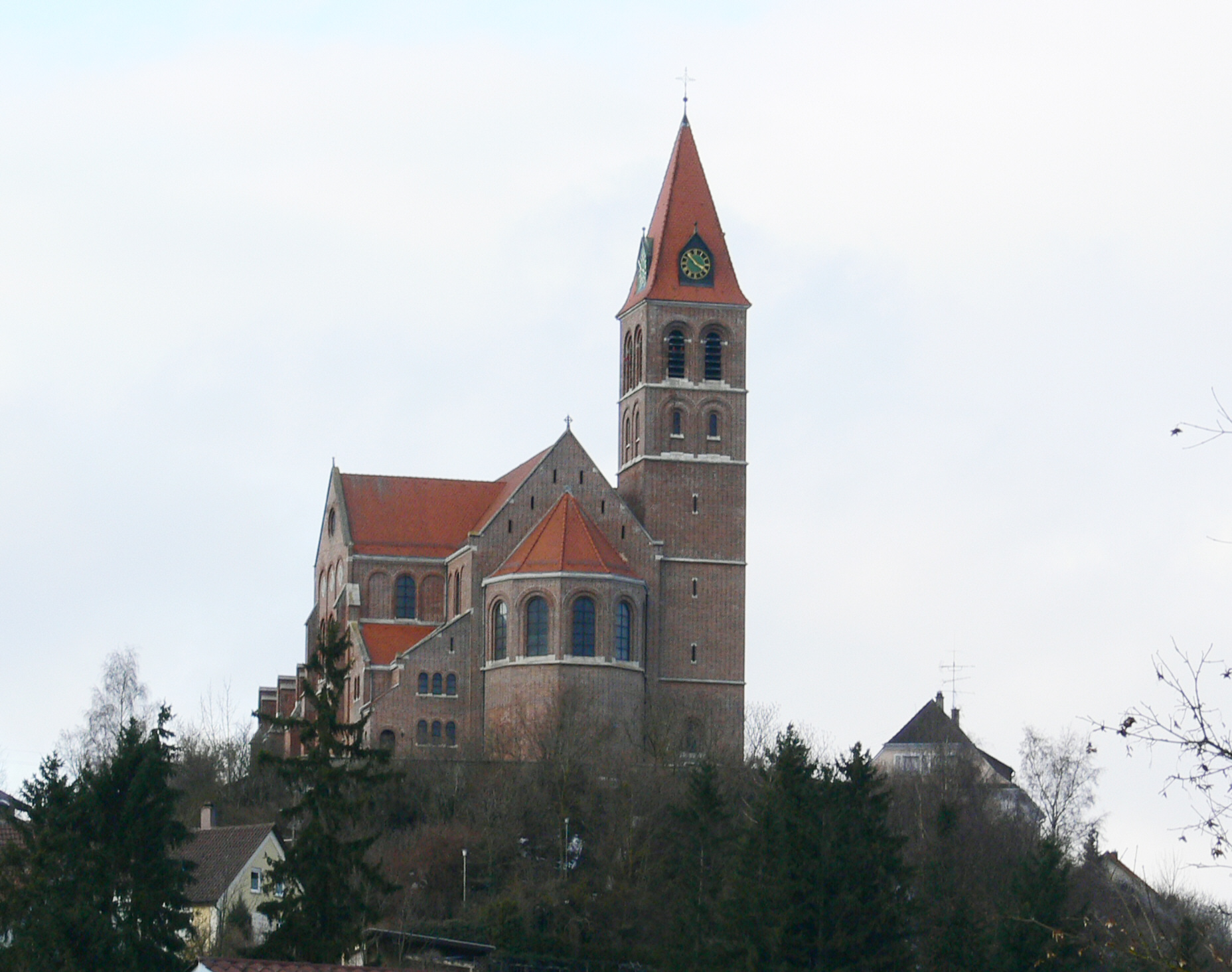
- Hundersingen St Martin

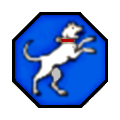
- Coat of arms
- Interactive map of Hundersingen
- Location within Germany Location within Baden-Württemberg
- Coordinates: 48°4′34″N 9°24′0″E
- Country: Germany
- State: Baden-Württemberg
- Admin. region: Tübingen
- District: Sigmaringen
- Municipality: Herbertingen

Area
  - Total: 9.68 km^{2} (3.74 sq mi)
- Elevation: 590 m (1,940 ft)

Population (2017)
  - Total: 935
  - Density: 96.6/km^{2} (250/sq mi)
- Time zone: UTC+01:00 (CET)
  - Summer (DST): UTC+02:00 (CEST)
- Postal codes: 88518
- Dialling codes: 07586
- Vehicle registration: SIG
- Website: www.herbertingen.net

Hundersingen is a village within the municipality of Herbertingen and is part of the administrative district of Sigmaringen in the state of Baden-Württemberg, Germany. As of 2017, it had a population of 935. Current municipal administrator is Reinhold Eisele. Hundersingen has a nursery school and a primary school.

== Geography ==
=== Geographical location ===
The village of Hundersingen is situated on the steep molasse hillside towards the left bank of the Danube and on its adjacent plateau. On the plateau's edge the Roman Catholic parish church of St Martin can be seen from afar. At the bottom of the valley the development area reaches as far as the river banks.

=== Size of the area ===
The total area of the district Hundersingen amounts to 9.68 km^{2}.

== History ==
The name Hundersingen is derived from the term 'huntare', which was used to describe a small administrative area under a Frankish king. Located near Hundersingen, the prehistoric hillfort Heuneburg was a prestigious princely residence and a thriving centre of power in the Golden Age of the Celts from 600 to 400 B.C. In 1511 A.D., Count Andreas von Sonnenberg was slain by Felix von Werdenberg († 1530) near Hundersingen in retaliation for defamation. Today, there is a memorial at the site of the murder.

The village was incorporated into Herbertingen in 1975.

=== Coat of arms ===
The formerly independent municipality Hundersingen led its own coat of arms. Blazon: A (heraldic) left-rising silver dog, in blue, with red collar.

== Culture and landmarks ==
The Heuneburg-Rundwanderweg is a circular educational trail that covers a distance of 8 kilometres. From its starting point, the Heuneburgmuseum in the village of Hundersingen, it traces the path of the most important archaeological sites of the early Celtic settlement centre on the upper course of the Danube and returns after approximately 2.5 to 3 hours to the trail head.

Starting at the museum, the hiking trail leads to the Lehenbühl, a burial mound from the first half of the sixth century. On this stretch sit the remains of the medieval castle Baumburg (Buwenburg), which might have originated from an Iron Age burial mound. From there the path leads to the open-air museum Heuneburg, a Celtic princely residence located about three kilometres north-east of Hundersingen.

The educational trail continues north towards a group of four big burial mounds at Gießübel/Talhau and towards the forest. Passing the Soppenweiher and the Wiedhauhütte, a small reservoir and a shack, the trail leads to the Hohmichele, one of the largest preserved burial mounds in Central Europe. It then continues past a Celtic Viereckschanze, a quadrangular Celtic enclosure typical for Southern Germany. Turning east the trail continues through woodland and then heads south over country lanes towards Hundersingen. All archaeological sites are clearly marked with detailed explanation plates.

=== Museum ===
The Heuneburgmuseum, in the former tithe barn of the monastery Heiligkreuztal, houses excavation finds from the Heuneburg and the Celtic princely graves.

=== Celtic burial site Bettelbühl Necropolis ===
In 2005, a child's grave including numerous burial objects was discovered approximately two kilometres south of the Heuneburg. It dates back to ca. 590 B.C.. As part of a rescue excavation, archaeologists of the State Office for Monument Protection Baden-Württemberg found a woman's grave in 2010. For treatment and analysis purposes, the 3,6x4,5m oaken burial chamber - containing the corpus of finds - with its surrounding soil was brought into a former factory building in Ludwigsburg. Between September 2012 and February 2013, selected troves were exhibited at the Große Landesausstellung Die Welt der Kelten (″The Celts′ World″) at the Landesmuseum Württemberg.

=== Historic building ===
- Pfarrkirche St. Martin, church constructed 1905-1906 by Joseph Cades in Neo-Romanesque style, containing well-preserved furnishings created during the Historicism.

== Notable resident ==
- Josef Karlmann Brechenmacher (1877–1960), German etymologist, teacher in Hundersingen around 1900.
