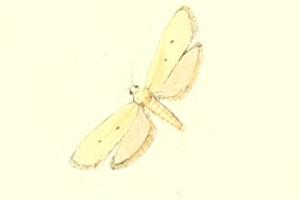

Scientific classification
- Kingdom: Animalia
- Phylum: Arthropoda
- Class: Insecta
- Order: Lepidoptera
- Family: Depressariidae
- Genus: Ethmia
- Species: E. distigmatella

Binomial name
- Ethmia distigmatella (Erschoff, 1874)

Synonyms
- Psecadia distigmatella Erschoff, 1874; Psecadia bipunctella Rebel, 1936 (preocc.); Psecadia distichella Rebel, 1949

= Ethmia distigmatella =

Species of moth

Ethmia distigmatella is a moth in the family Depressariidae (though alternative family-level taxonomies exist). It is found on Crete and in the Taurus Mountains in Turkey, as well as in Afghanistan and Uzbekistan.

The larvae feed on the inflorescences of Heliotropium europaeum. Adults emerge when flowering has commenced and oviposit on the flowers.
