= Herbertingen =

- Municipality
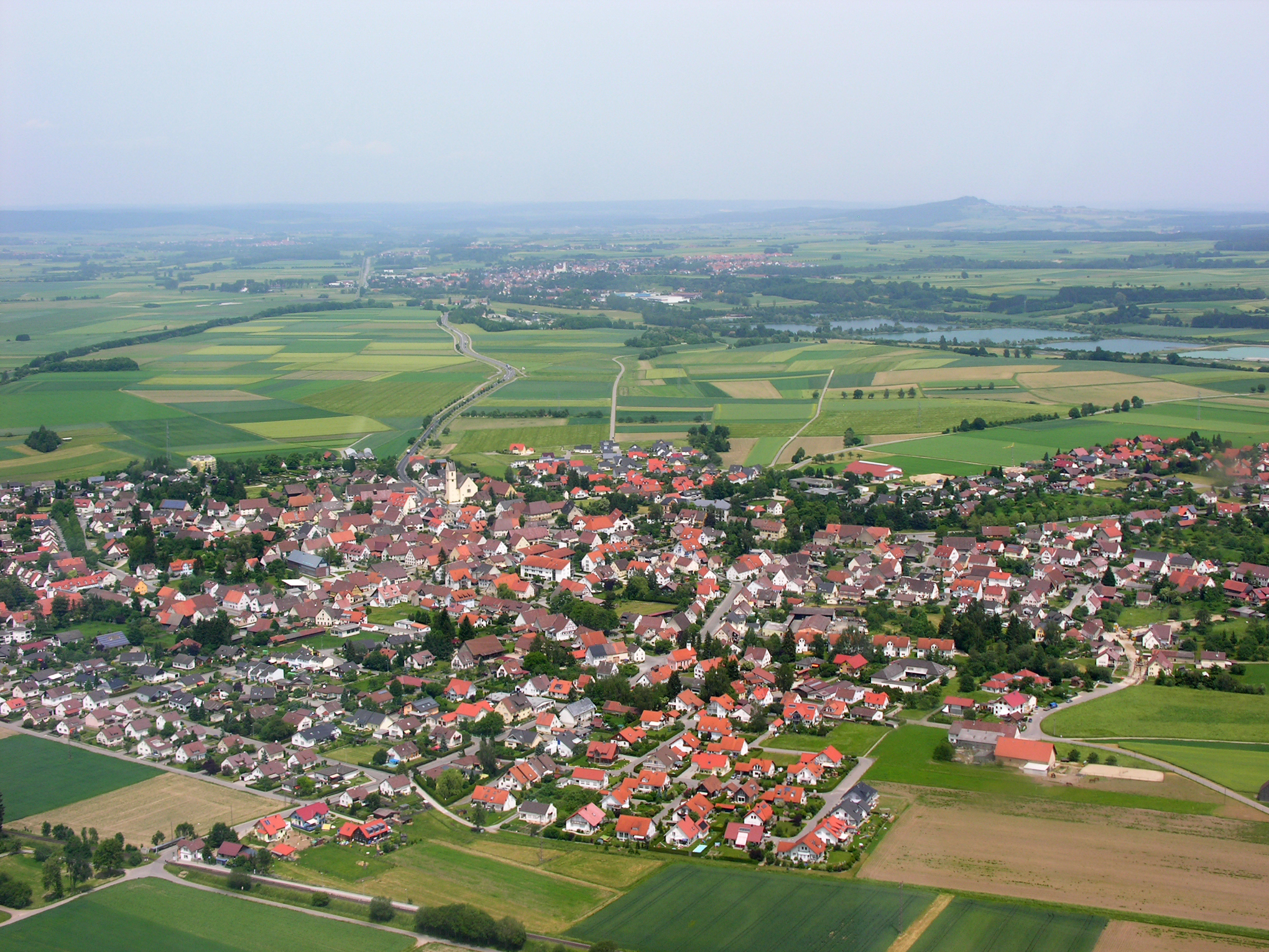
- Aerial view

- Coat of arms

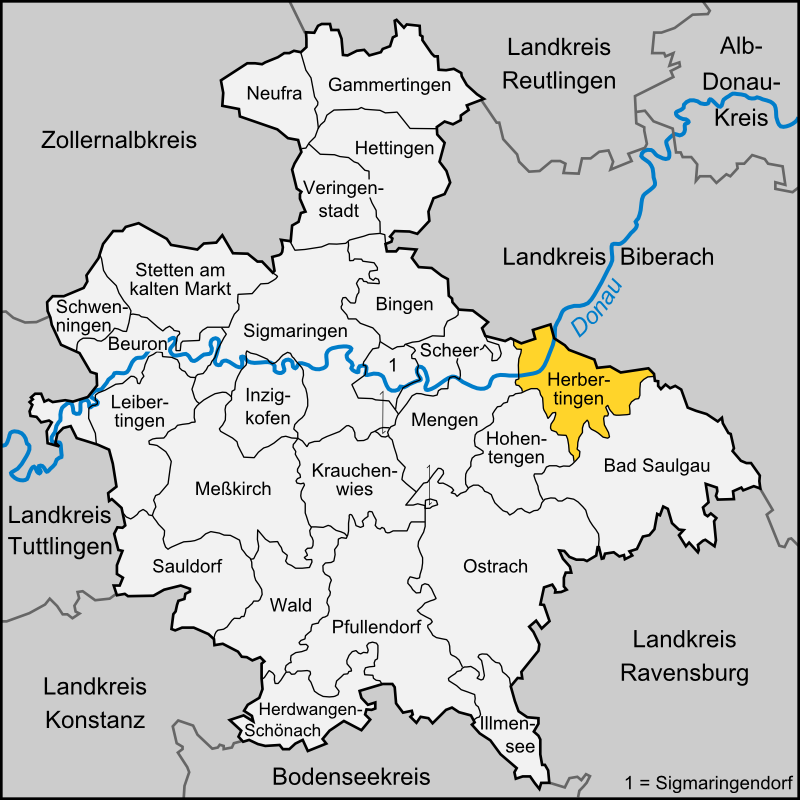
- Location of Herbertingen within Sigmaringen district
- Interactive map of Herbertingen
- Location within Germany Location within Baden-Württemberg
- Coordinates: 48°3′30″N 9°26′21″E
- Country: Germany
- State: Baden-Württemberg
- Admin. region: Tübingen
- District: Sigmaringen
- Subdivisions: 4

Government
  - Mayor (2023–31): Magnus Hoppe (Ind.)

Area
  - Total: 38.64 km^{2} (14.92 sq mi)
- Elevation: 562 m (1,844 ft)

Population (2025-12-31)
  - Total: 4,778
  - Density: 123.7/km^{2} (320.3/sq mi)
- Time zone: UTC+01:00 (CET)
  - Summer (DST): UTC+02:00 (CEST)
- Postal codes: 88516–88518
- Dialling codes: 07586
- Vehicle registration: SIG
- Website: www.herbertingen.de

Herbertingen (Swabian: Herberdenga) is a municipality in the district of Sigmaringen in Baden-Württemberg in Germany. The municipality Herbertingen consists of the villages Herbertingen, Hundersingen, Marbach and Mieterkingen. Herbertingen is twinned with Saint-Paul-en-Jarez in France.

== Geography ==
The community Herbertingen with its rolling hills and wide valleys is located on the northern edge of Upper Swabia. The landscape is formed by the ice masses and the meltwater of the Rhine glacier, which has been advancing from the Alps to Upper Swabia for more than 2 million years during several ice ages. The valleys of the Danube, Schwarzach and Krähenbach were carved into the molasse layers, colorful marls and glimmering fine sands, which form the core of the long hills between the valleys and their subsoil. The glacier of the penultimate, the crack ice age (200,000 to 130,000 years before today) crossed the territory of the community with repeated advances and left deep valleys and small lakes between steep hills with fat ground moraine on hills and slopes for agriculture and gravel for the gravel pits.

The glacier of the last, the Würm Ice Age (115,000 to 11,500 years before today) did not reach the municipality, but remained stuck south of Bad Saulgau. His melt waters filled the Schwarzachtal with gravel. The glacial landscape in front of the glacier's forehead was a deep frozen, almost treeless Arctic cold desert. In the Arctic summer, the earth thawed superficially, flowed as mud to the base of a slope or was flooded by the rain, the steep slopes flattened: The old landscape took on the sanded soft shapes that we know today.

11,500 years old is the warm period in which we live. More than 10,000 years ago, deciduous forest began to cover the land, bogs grew in depressions and wet valleys, where the streams and rivers flowed in loops. Over 6,000 years ago, man began managing nature. The Danube was not so easy to control; she has cut open until the regulation with dikes, the left half of the valley with flood waters with new loops.

For buses (767 m above sea level), it is only a stone's throw away. The "holy mountain of Upper Swabia", a landmark that can be seen from afar, opens the view to the nearby Federsee and its moor girdle and, with visibility, over the entire Alpine arc. The Swabian Alb with streams of water, framed by white limestone cliffs on valley walls, with plateaus, juniper heaths and stalactite caves, is developed by a network of cycling and hiking trails. The Upper Danube also attracts with its breakthrough valley. For Lake Constance, with its mild climate and own vegetation, it is just 50 km, where you cross the Jungmoränen landscape with half-timbered towns and baroque monasteries and churches.

== Transport ==
Herbertingen is served by the Ulm–Sigmaringen railway.

== Culture and monuments ==
=== Archeological location ===
- The Heuneburg, Residence of Celtic Princes at Hundersingen

=== Museum ===
- The Celtic Museum (Keltenmuseum) at Hundersingen
