= Ostrach =

- Municipality
- Coat of arms

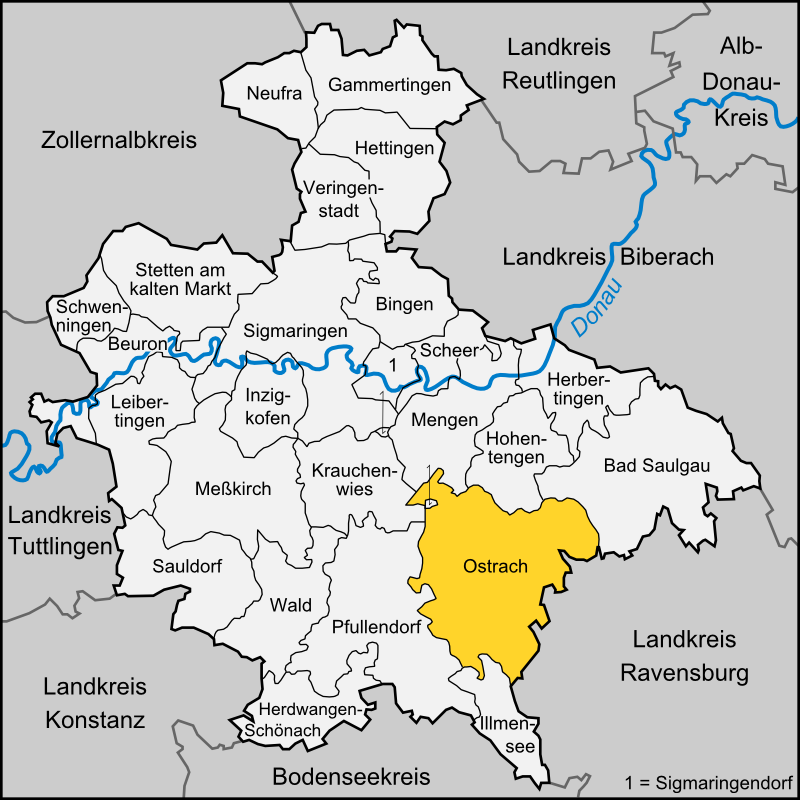
- Location of Ostrach within Sigmaringen district
- Interactive map of Ostrach
- Location within Germany Location within Baden-Württemberg
- Coordinates: 47°57′9″N 9°22′53″E
- Country: Germany
- State: Baden-Württemberg
- Admin. region: Tübingen
- District: Sigmaringen
- Subdivisions: 9

Government
  - Mayor (2023–31): Lena Burth

Area
  - Total: 108.89 km^{2} (42.04 sq mi)
- Elevation: 611 m (2,005 ft)

Population (2025-12-31)
  - Total: 7,013
  - Density: 64.40/km^{2} (166.8/sq mi)
- Time zone: UTC+01:00 (CET)
  - Summer (DST): UTC+02:00 (CEST)
- Postal codes: 88354–88356
- Dialling codes: 07585
- Vehicle registration: SIG
- Website: www.ostrach.de

Ostrach (German pronunciation: [ˈɔstʁax]) is a municipality in the district of Sigmaringen in Baden-Württemberg in Germany.

== Geography ==
Ostrach lies between the Danube and Lake Constance, about halfway between Sigmaringen and Ravensburg. It lies on the brook of the same name, which passes through a narrow pass between the glacial moraines left by the Rhine Glacier at the end of the last ice age. The landscape is hilly and wooded. Abandoned quarries to the north and south of the village of Jettkofen have created small lakes.

== History ==
The first mention of Ostrach occurs in 851. In the 13th century, the area passed gradually from the Holy Roman Empire into the hands of the monastery of Salem.

On 21 March 1799 the Austrian and French troops fought a battle at Ostrach. In 1803, in the German Mediatisation, Ostrach and Bachhaupten passed into the hands of the house of Thurn und Taxis, and in 1806 they were incorporated into the lands of the house of Hohenzollern-Sigmaringen.

The railway line Altshausen-Ostrach-Pfullendorf opened in 1875. The last freight train passed through Ostrach on 31 July 2002.

On 1 January 1975 the surrounding villages of Burgweiler (with Dichtenhausen, Hahnennest, Ochsenbach, Waldbeuren, Ulzhausen, Egelreute), Einhart, Habsthal (with Bernweiler), Jettkofen, Kalkreute, Laubbach, Levertsweiler, Magenbuch (with Lausheim), Spöck, Tafertsweiler (with Bachhaupten, Eschendorf, and Gunzenhausen), Wangen, and Wirnsweiler were incorporated into Ostrach.

== Mayors ==
- 1975–2007: Herbert Barth (CDU)
- 2007–2023: Christoph Schulz (CDU)
- since 2023: Lena Burth (independent)

== Sons and daughters of the town ==
- Eduard Schmid (1861-1933), politician (SPD), 1919-1924 Lord Mayor of Munich
- Reinhold Frank (born 1896-1945), born in today's district Bachhaupten, lawyer, resistance fighter against national socialism, executed after the failed Hitler assassination of 20 July 1944
