= House of Hohenzollern =

German royal and imperial dynasty

- Country: Germany, Romania
- Etymology: Hohenzollern Castle
- Founded: Before 1061
- Founder: Burkhard I, Lord of Zollern
- Current head: Germany and Prussia: Prince Georg Friedrich (1994–present); Hohenzollern-Sigmaringen: Prince Karl Friedrich (2010–present)
- Final ruler: Germany and Prussia: Kaiser Wilhelm II (1888–1918); Romania: King Michael I (1927–1930, 1940–1947)
- Titles: German Emperor; Count of Zollern; Margrave of Brandenburg; Duke of Prussia; Burgrave of Nuremberg; Margrave of Brandenburg-Bayreuth; Margrave of Brandenburg-Ansbach; King of Prussia; King in Prussia; King of Romania; Grand Master of the Teutonic Order; Prince of Hohenzollern-Hechingen (before 1869); Prince of Hohenzollern-Sigmaringen (before 1869); Prince of Hohenzollern (after 1869); Prince of Neuchâtel (1707–1807, 1814–1857); Prince of Romania Grand Voevode of Alba Iulia
- Estates: Germany, Prussia, Romania, Russia
- Deposition: Germany and Prussia: 1918: Abdication of Wilhelm II; Romania: 1947: Abdication of Michael I
- Branches: Franconian branch; Swabian branch; Romanian branch; Hohenberg branch

The House of Hohenzollern (/ˌhoʊənˈzɒlərn/, US also /-nˈzɔːl-, -ntˈsɔːl-/; German: Haus Hohenzollern, pronounced [ˌhaʊs hoːənˈtsɔlɐn]; Romanian: Casa de Hohenzollern) is a formerly royal (and from 1871 to 1918, imperial) German dynasty whose members were variously princes, electors, kings and emperors of Hohenzollern, Brandenburg, Prussia, the German Empire, and Romania. The family came from the area around the town of Hechingen in Swabia during the late 11th century and took their name from Hohenzollern Castle. The first ancestors of the Hohenzollerns were mentioned in 1061.

The Hohenzollern family split into two branches, the Catholic Swabian branch and the Protestant Franconian branch, which ruled the Burgraviate of Nuremberg and later became the Brandenburg–Prussian branch. The Swabian branch ruled the principalities of Hohenzollern-Hechingen and Hohenzollern-Sigmaringen until 1849, and also ruled Romania from 1866 to 1947. Members of the Franconian branch became Margrave of Brandenburg in 1415 and Duke of Prussia in 1525.

The Margraviate of Brandenburg and the Duchy of Prussia were ruled in personal union after 1618 and were called Brandenburg-Prussia. From there, the Kingdom of Prussia was created in 1701, eventually leading to the unification of Germany and the creation of the German Empire in 1871, with the Hohenzollerns as hereditary German Emperors and Kings of Prussia.

Germany's defeat in World War I in 1918 led to the German Revolution. The Hohenzollerns were overthrown and the Weimar Republic was established, thus bringing an end to the German and Prussian monarchy. Georg Friedrich, Prince of Prussia, is the current head of the formerly royal Prussian line; while Karl Friedrich, Prince of Hohenzollern, is the head of the formerly princely Swabian line.

== County of Zollern ==
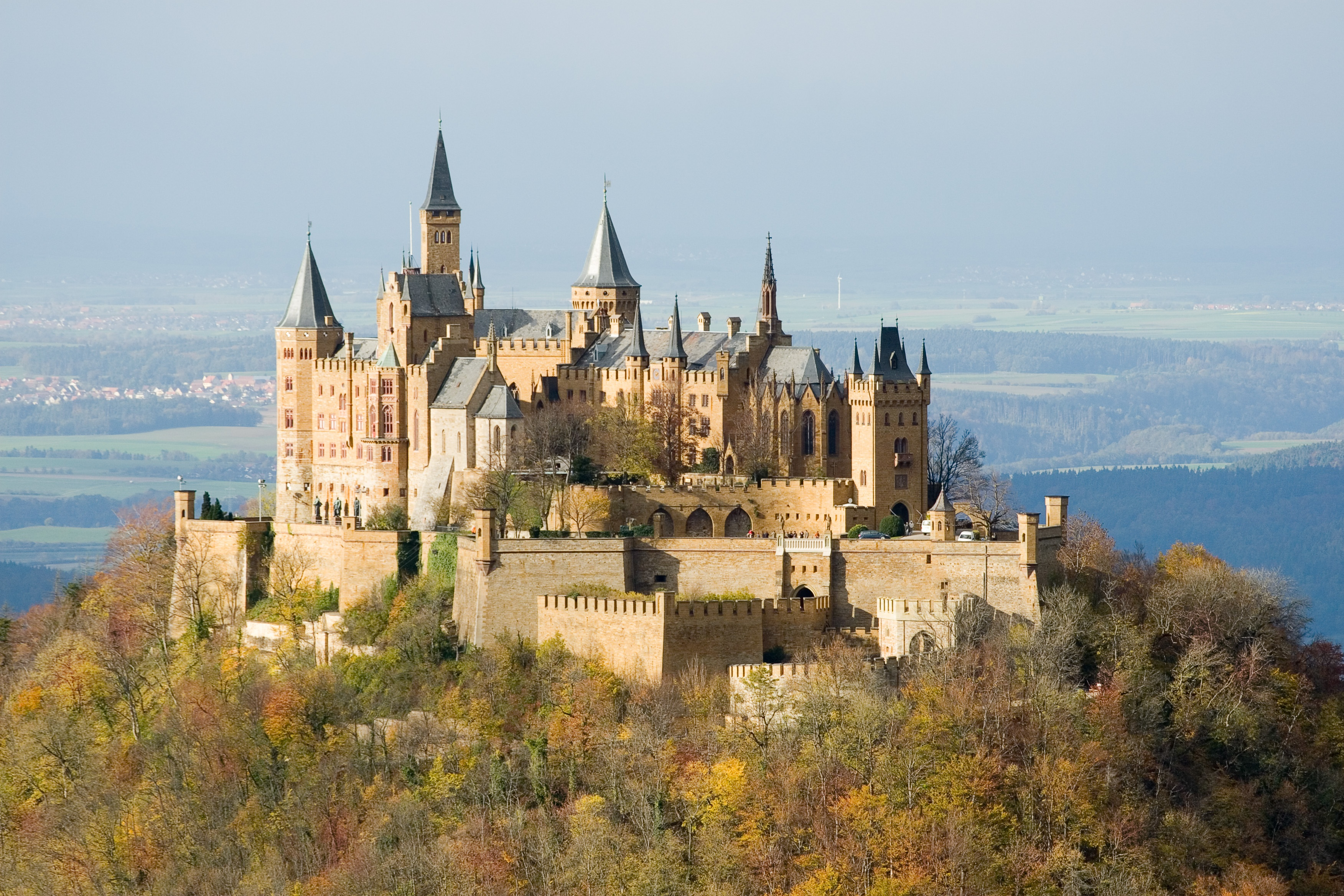
Hohenzollern Castle, near Hechingen, was built in the mid-19th century by Frederick William IV of Prussia on the remains of the castle founded in the early 11th century.

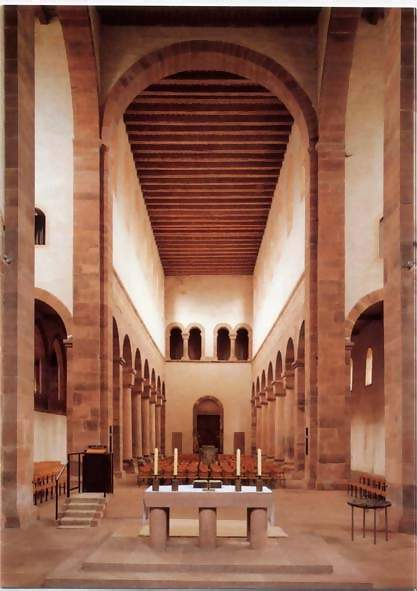
Alpirsbach Abbey, founded by the Hohenzollerns in 1095

Zollern, from 1218 Hohenzollern, was a county of the Holy Roman Empire. Later its capital was Hechingen.

The Hohenzollerns named their estates after Hohenzollern Castle in the Swabian Alps. The Hohenzollern Castle lies on an 855 meters high mountain called Hohenzollern. It still belongs to the family today.

The dynasty was first mentioned in 1061. According to the medieval chronicler Berthold of Reichenau, Burkhard I, Count of Zollern (de Zolorin) was born before 1025 and died in 1061. In 1560, at the behest of Karl I, Count of Hohenzollern, the historian Johann Basilius Herold invented Tassilo, Count of Zollern as the legendary progenitor of the dynasty, an alleged grandson of Charlemagne, although his existence was disproven in the 19th century. Burkhard I is therefore the first historically attested member of the dynasty.

In 1095, Count Adalbert of Zollern founded the Benedictine monastery of Alpirsbach, situated in the Black Forest.

The Zollerns received the Graf title from Emperor Henry V in 1111.

As loyal vassals of the Swabian Hohenstaufen dynasty, they were able to significantly enlarge their territory. Count Frederick III (c. 1139 – c. 1200) accompanied Emperor Frederick Barbarossa against Henry the Lion in 1180, and through his marriage was granted the Burgraviate of Nuremberg by Emperor Henry VI in 1192. In about 1185, he married Sophia of Raabs, the daughter of Conrad II, Burgrave of Nuremberg. After the death of Conrad II who left no male heirs, Frederick III was granted Nuremberg as Burgrave Frederick I.

In 1218, the burgraviate passed to Frederick's elder son Conrad I; he thereby became the ancestor of the Franconian Hohenzollern branch, which acquired the Electorate of Brandenburg in 1415.

== Franconian branch ==
The senior Franconian branch of the House of Hohenzollern was founded by Conrad I, Burgrave of Nuremberg (1186–1261).

The family supported the Hohenstaufen and Habsburg rulers of the Holy Roman Empire during the 12th to 15th centuries, being rewarded with several territorial grants. Beginning in the 16th century, this branch of the family became Protestant and decided on expansion through marriage and the purchase of surrounding lands.

In the first phase, the family gradually added to their lands, at first with many small acquisitions in the Franconian region of Germany:

- Ansbach in 1331
- Kulmbach in 1340

In the second phase, the family expanded their lands further with large acquisitions in the Brandenburg and Prussian regions of Germany and present-day Poland:

- Margraviate of Brandenburg in 1417
- Duchy of Prussia in 1525

These acquisitions eventually transformed the Franconian Hohenzollerns from a minor German princely family into one of the most important dynasties in Europe.

From 8 January 1701 the title of Elector of Brandenburg was attached to the title of King in Prussia and, from 13 September 1772, to that of King of Prussia.

=== Burgraviate of Nuremberg (1192–1427) and the Principalities of Ansbach (1398–1791) and Kulmbach/Bayreuth (1398–1791) ===
As a burgraviate, Nuremberg was located in the namesake town; almost two centuries later, the burgraviate lost power over the city, which became independent from 1219. The burgraviate was eventually partitioned into Ansbach and Bayreuth. In 1427 Frederick, Elector of Brandenburg sold Nuremberg Castle and his rights as burgrave to the Imperial City of Nuremberg. The territories of Brandenburg-Ansbach and Brandenburg-Kulmbach remained possessions of the family, once parts of the Burgraviate of Nuremberg.

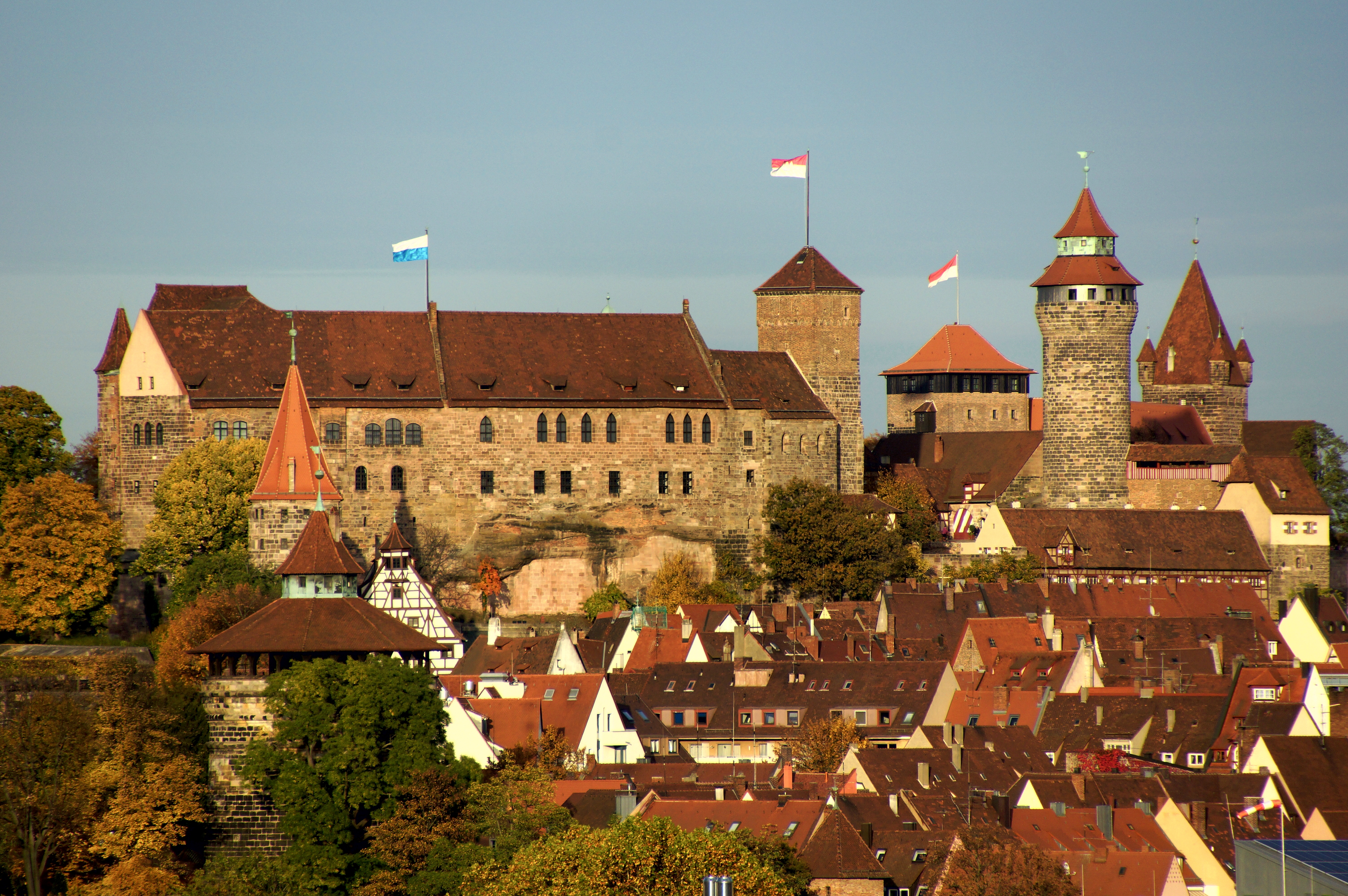
Nuremberg Castle (the Emperor's castle, left, and the Burgrave's castle, right)

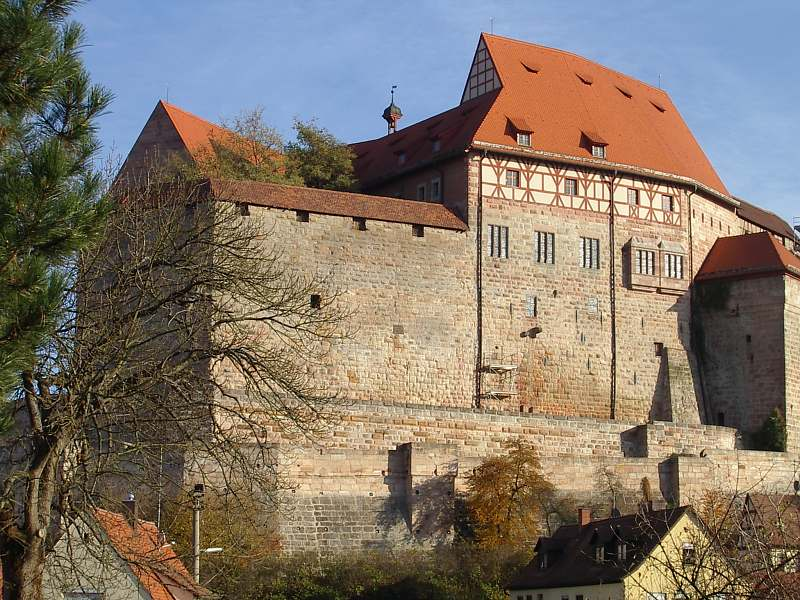
Cadolzburg Castle near Nuremberg (from 1260 seat of the Burgraves)

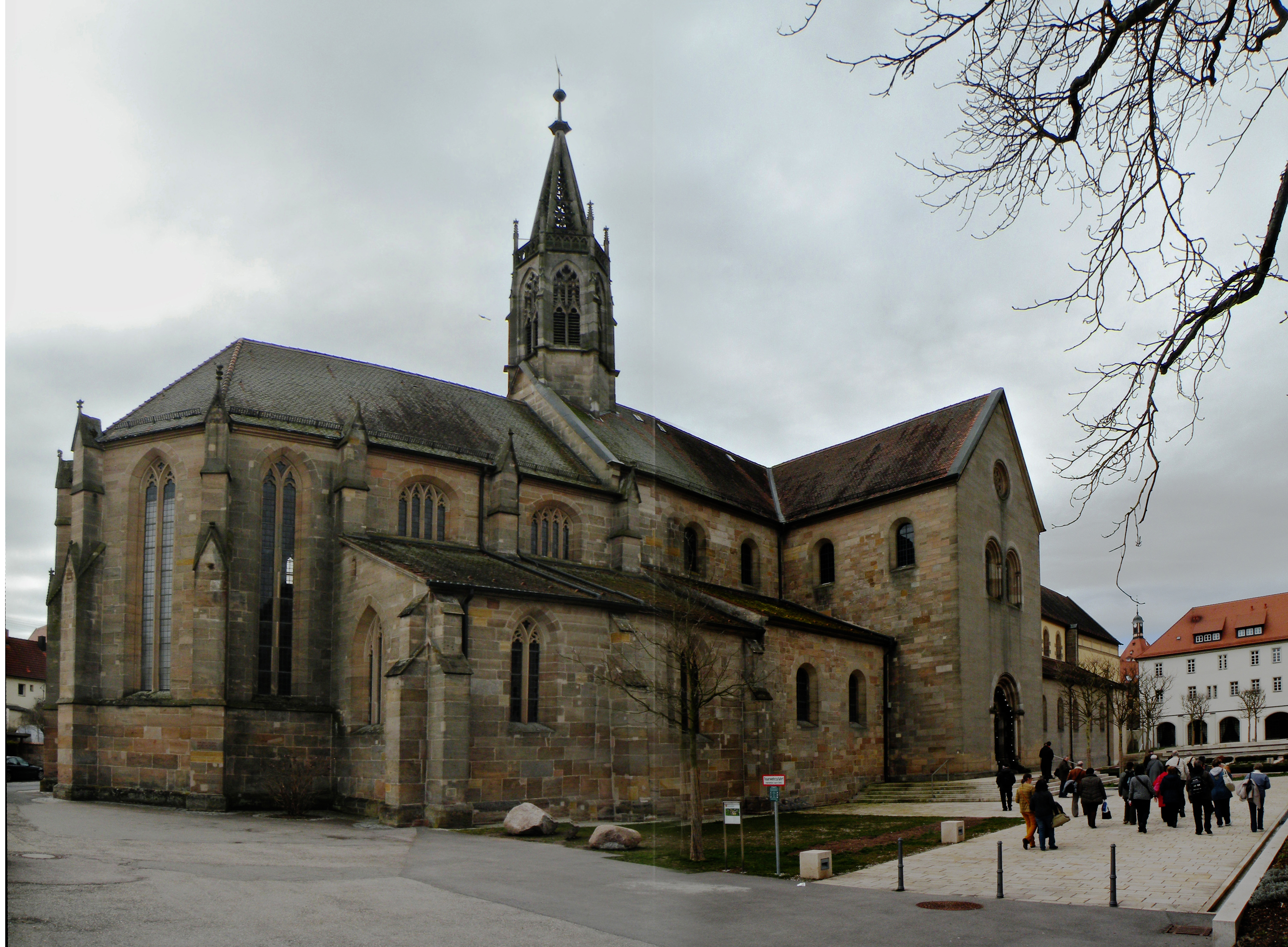
Heilsbronn Abbey, which the Hohenzollerns used as the family burial place

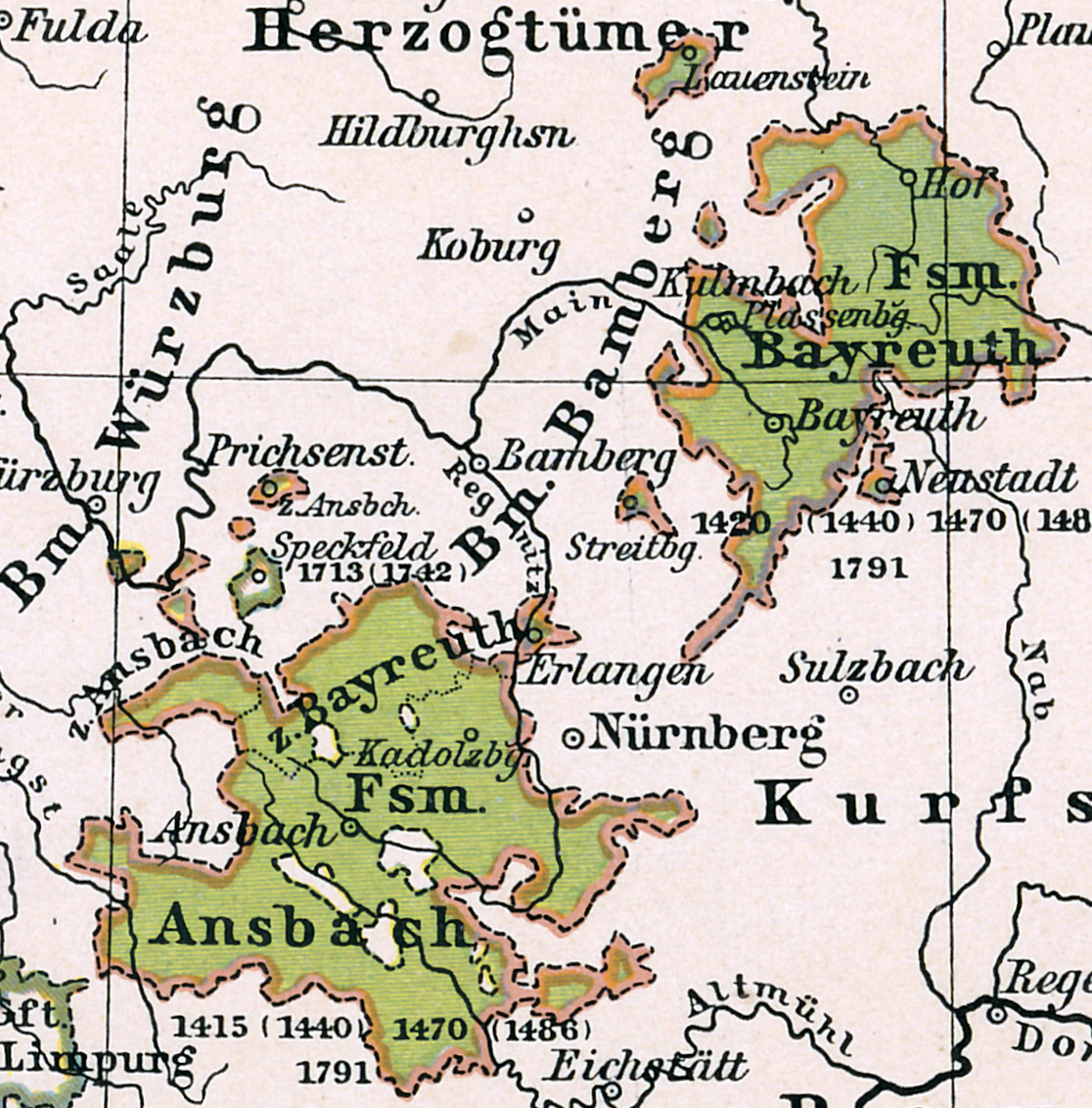
Region of Nuremberg, Ansbach, Kulmbach and Bayreuth (Franconia)

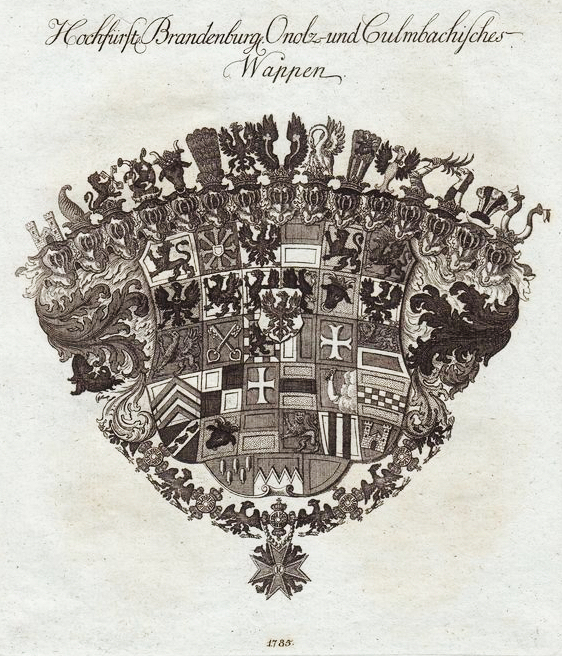
Coat of arms of Brandenburg-Kulmbach and Bayreuth
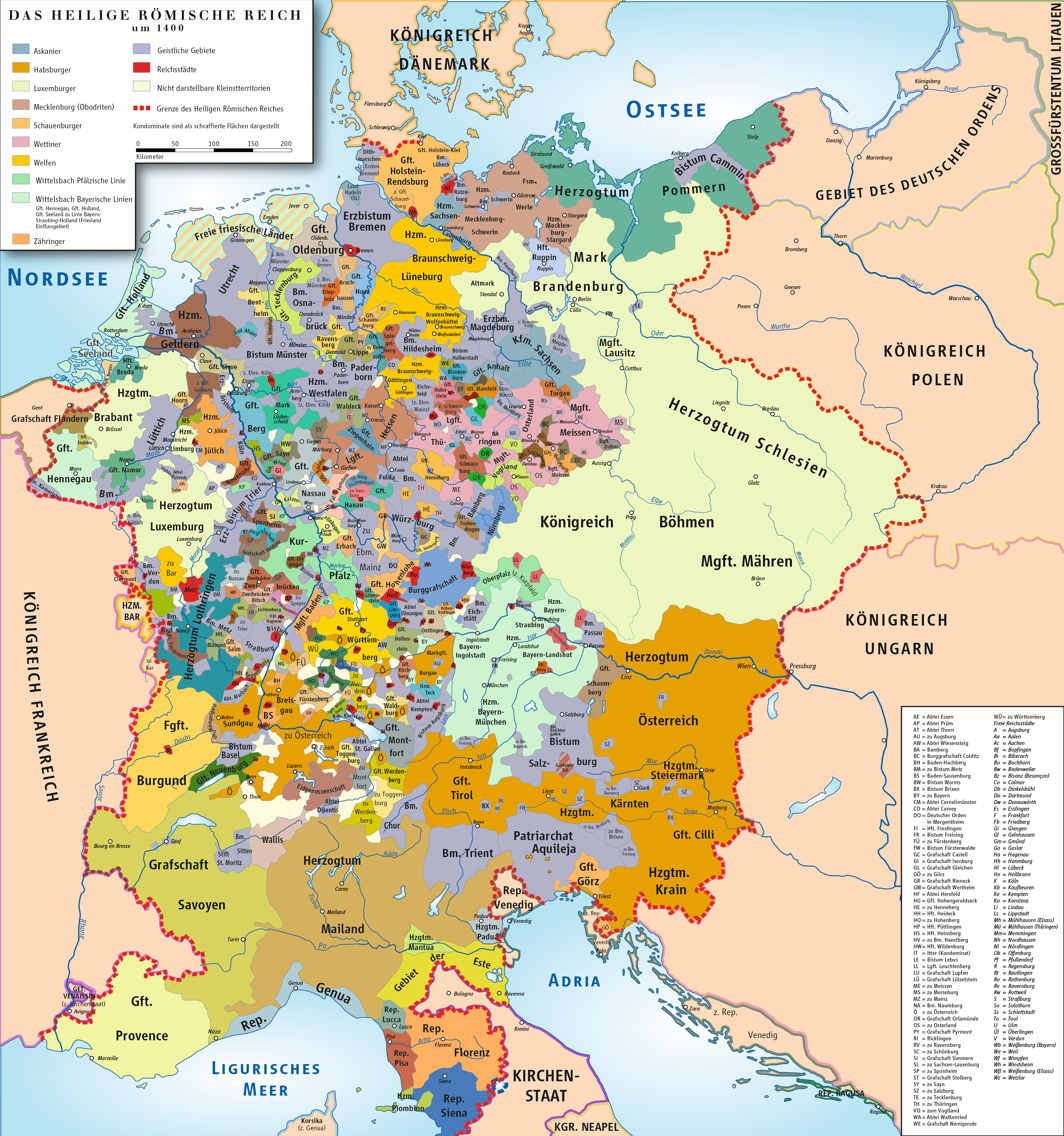
Burgraviate of Nuremberg (Burggrafschaft Nürnberg) with the independent Free Imperial City of Nuremberg in red
The original Burgraviate of Nuremberg (Burggrafschaft Nürnberg) developed into the Burgraviate of Ansbach and the Burgraviate of Bayreuth with the independent Free Imperial City of Nuremberg in red.

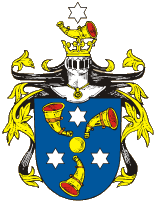

=== Dukes of Jägerndorf (1523–1622) ===
The Duchy of Jägerndorf (Krnov) was purchased in 1523, and was confiscated by Emperor Ferdinand III in 1622.

=== Margraviate of Brandenburg (1415–1619) ===
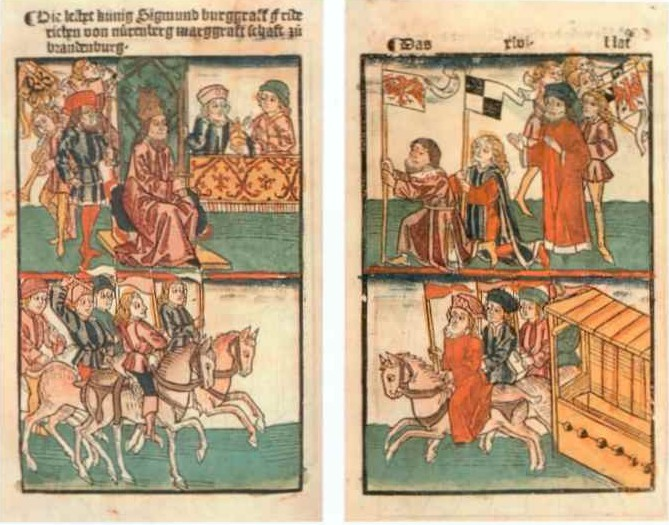
Frederick VI became Margrave of Brandenburg in 1415.

In 1411, Frederick VI, Burgrave of the small but wealthy Nuremberg, was appointed governor of Brandenburg in order to restore order and stability. At the Council of Constance in 1415, King Sigismund elevated Frederick to the rank of Elector and Margrave of Brandenburg as Frederick I. In 1417, Elector Frederick purchased Brandenburg from its then-sovereign, Emperor Sigismund, for 400,000 Hungarian guilders.

Coat of arms of the Margraviate of Küstrin

Coat of arms of the Margraviate of Schwedt

==== Margraviate of Küstrin (1535–1571) ====
The short-lived Margraviate of Brandenburg-Küstrin was set up as a secundogeniture of the House of Hohenzollern.

==== Margraviate of Schwedt (1688–1788) ====
Although recognized as a branch of the dynasty since 1688, the Margraviate of Brandenburg-Schwedt remained subordinate to the electors, and was never an independent principality.

=== Dukes of Prussia (1525–1701) ===
In 1525, the Duchy of Prussia was established as a fief of the King of Poland. Albert of Prussia was the last Grand Master of the Teutonic Knights and the first Duke of Prussia. He belonged to the Ansbach branch of the dynasty. The Duchy of Prussia adopted Protestantism as the official state religion.

From 1701, the title of Duke of Prussia was attached to the title of King in and of Prussia.

Coat of arms of the Dukes of Prussia

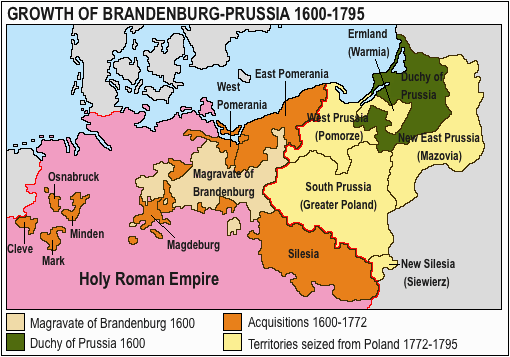
Growth of Brandenburg-Prussia, 1600–1795

=== Kings in Prussia (1701–1772) and Kingdom of Prussia (1772–1918) ===

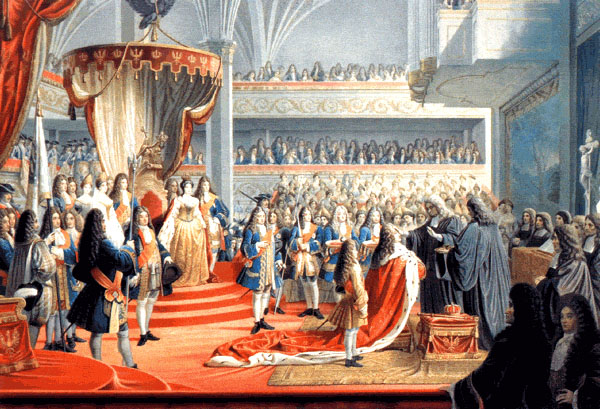
Coronation of Frederick I in Königsberg

In 1701, the title of King in Prussia was granted, without the Duchy of Prussia being elevated to a Kingdom within Poland but recognized as a kingdom by the Holy Roman Emperor, theoretically the highest sovereign in the West. From 1701 onwards the titles of Duke of Prussia and Elector of Brandenburg were always attached to the title of King in Prussia. The Duke of Prussia adopted the title of king as Frederick I, establishing his status as a monarch whose royal territory lay outside the boundaries of the Holy Roman Empire, with the assent of Emperor Leopold I: Frederick could not be "King of Prussia" because part of Prussia's lands were under the suzerainty of the Crown of the Kingdom of Poland. In Brandenburg and the other Hohenzollern domains within the borders of the empire, he was legally still an elector under the ultimate overlordship of the emperor. By this time, however, the emperor's authority had become purely nominal over the other German princes outside the immediate hereditary lands of the emperor. Brandenburg was still legally part of the empire and ruled in personal union with Prussia, though the two states came to be treated as one de facto. The king was officially Margrave of Brandenburg within the Empire until the Empire's dissolution in 1806. In the age of absolutism, most monarchs were obsessed with the desire to emulate Louis XIV of France with his luxurious palace at Versailles.

In 1772, the Duchy of Prussia was elevated to a kingdom.

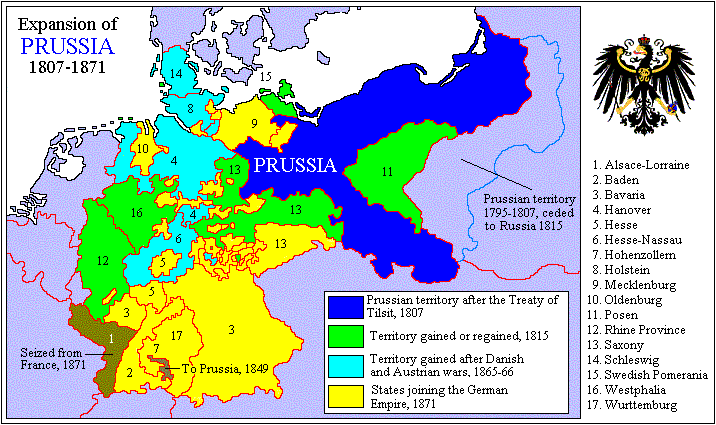
Expansion of Prussia, 1807–1871

Frederick William's successor, Frederick the Great gained Silesia in the Silesian Wars so that Prussia emerged as a great power. The king was strongly influenced by French culture and civilization and preferred the French language.

In the 1772 First Partition of Poland, the Prussian king Frederick the Great annexed neighboring Royal Prussia, i.e., the Polish voivodeships of Pomerania (Gdańsk Pomerania or Pomerelia), Malbork, Chełmno and the Prince-Bishopric of Warmia, thereby connecting his Prussian and Farther Pomeranian lands and cutting off the rest of Poland from the Baltic coast. The territory of Warmia was incorporated into the lands of former Ducal Prussia, which, by administrative deed of 31 January 1772 were named East Prussia. The former Polish Pomerelian lands beyond the Vistula River together with Malbork and Chełmno Land formed the province of West Prussia with its capital at Marienwerder (Kwidzyn) in 1773. The Polish Partition Sejm ratified the cession on 30 September 1772, whereafter Frederick officially went on to call himself King "of" Prussia. From 1772 onwards the titles of Duke of Prussia and Elector of Brandenburg were always attached to the title King of Prussia.

In 1871, the Kingdom of Prussia became a constituent member of the German Empire, and the King of Prussia gained the additional title of German Emperor.

=== German Empire (1871–1918) ===

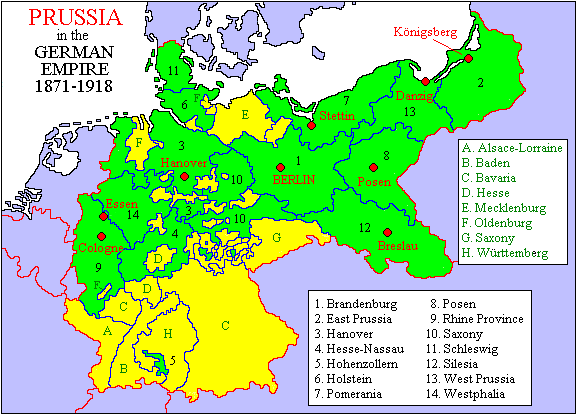
Prussia in the German Empire, 1871–1918

In 1871, the German Empire was proclaimed. With the accession of William I to the newly established imperial German throne, the titles of King of Prussia, Duke of Prussia and Elector of Brandenburg were always attached to the title of German Emperor.

Prussia's Minister President Otto von Bismarck convinced William that German Emperor instead of Emperor of Germany would be appropriate. He became primus inter pares among other German sovereigns.

William II intended to develop a German navy capable of challenging Britain's Royal Navy. The assassination of Archduke Franz Ferdinand of Austria on 28 June 1914 set off the chain of events that led to World War I. As a result of the war, the German, Russian, Austro-Hungarian and Ottoman empires ceased to exist.

The new Hohenzollern crypt (Hohenzollerngruft) in the new Berlin Cathedral was completed in 1905.

In 1918, the German empire was abolished and replaced by the Weimar Republic. After the outbreak of the German revolution in 1918, both Emperor William II and Crown Prince William signed the document of abdication.

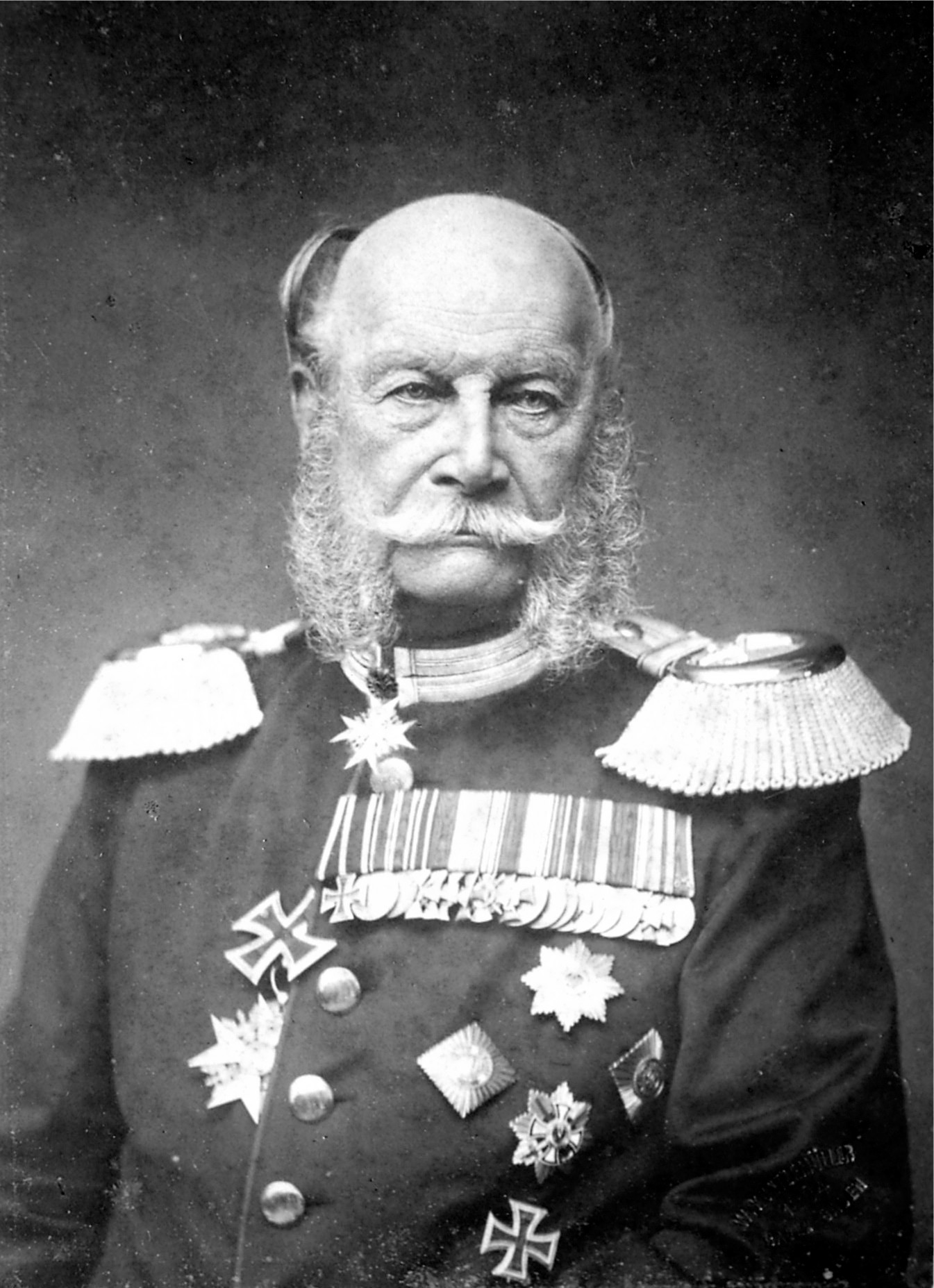
William I (1871–1888)

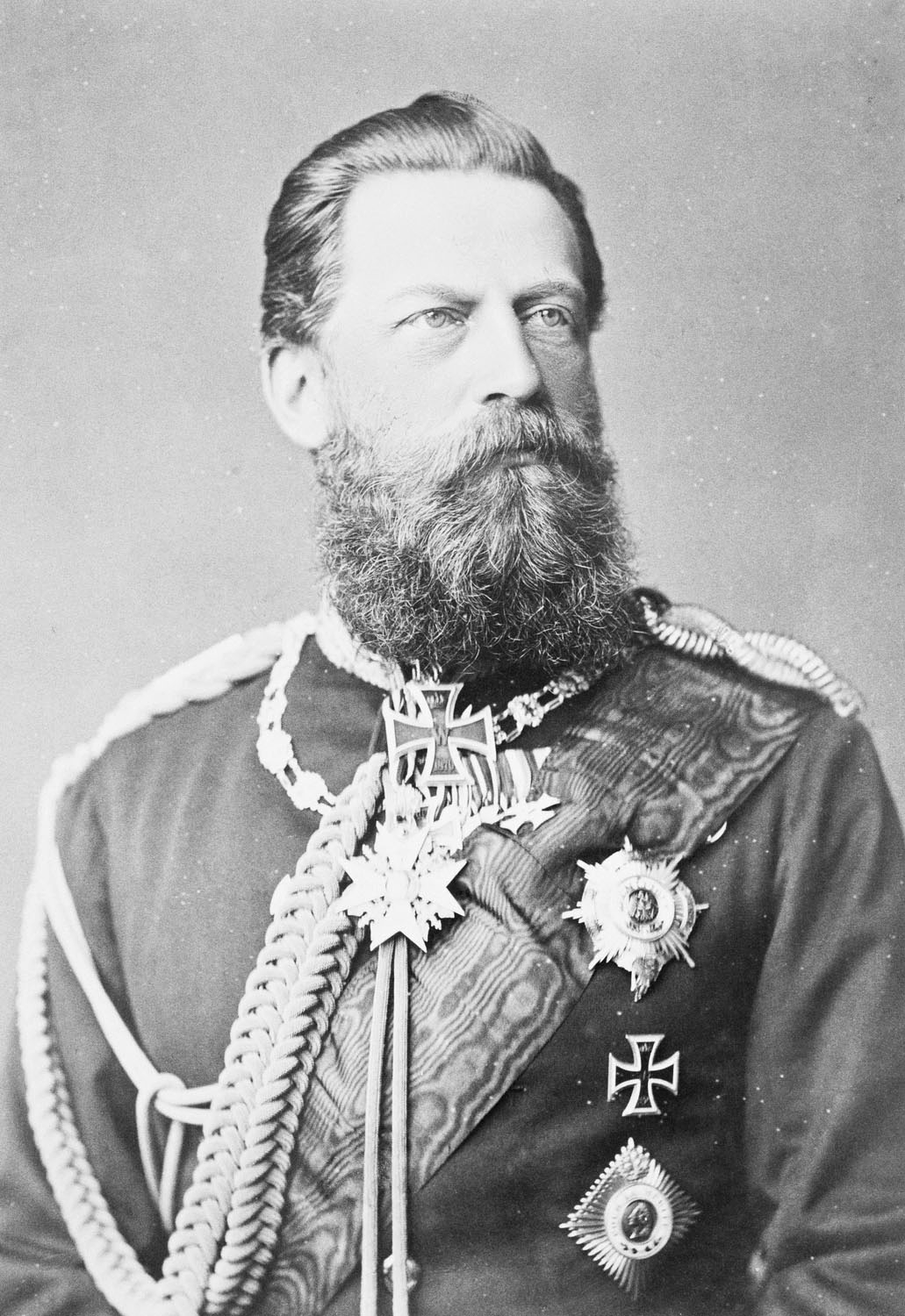
Frederick III (1888)

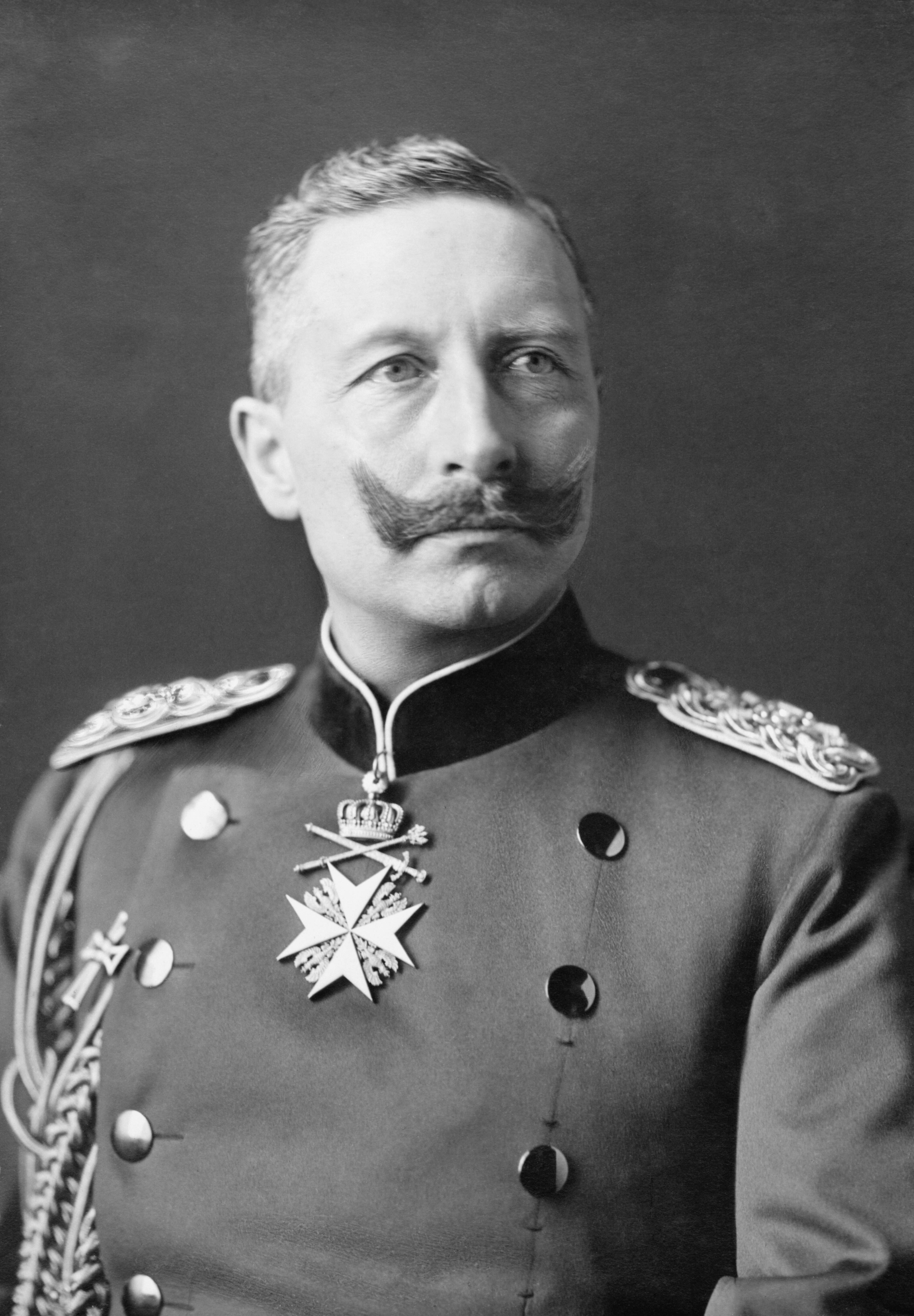
William II (1888–1918)

=== Prussian Hohenzollern religion and religious policy ===
The official religion of the state was "bi-confessional". John Sigismund's most significant action was his conversion from Lutheranism to Calvinism, after he had earlier equalized the rights of Catholics and Protestants in the Duchy of Prussia under pressure from the King of Poland. He was probably won over to Calvinism during a visit to Heidelberg in 1606, but it was not until 25 December 1613 that he publicly took communion according to the Calvinist rite. The vast majority of his subjects in Brandenburg, including his wife Anna of Prussia, remained deeply Lutheran, however. After the Elector and his Calvinist court officials drew up plans for mass conversion of the population to the new faith in February 1614, as provided for by the rule of Cuius regio, eius religio within the Holy Roman Empire, there were serious protests, with his wife backing the Lutherans. This was doubly important as Anna brought with her the duchy of Prussia into the Brandenburg line of the house and the nascent Brandenburg-Prussian state. Resistance was so strong that in 1615, John Sigismund backed down and relinquished all attempts at forcible conversion. Instead, he allowed his subjects to be either Lutheran or Calvinist according to the dictates of their own consciences. Henceforward, Brandenburg-Prussia would be a bi-confessional state, with the ruling Hohenzollern house staying Calvinist.

This situation persisted until Frederick William III of Prussia. Frederick William was determined to unify the Protestant churches to homogenize their liturgy, organization, and architecture. The long-term goal was to have fully centralized royal control of all the Protestant churches in the Prussian Union of Churches. The merging of the Lutheran and Calvinist (Reformed) confessions to form the United Church of Prussia was highly controversial. Angry responses included a large and well-organized opposition. The crown's aggressive efforts to restructure religion were unprecedented in Prussian history. In a series of proclamations over several years, the Church of the Prussian Union was formed, bringing together the majority group of Lutherans and the minority group of Reformed Protestants. The main effect was that the government of Prussia had full control over church affairs, with the king himself recognized as the leading bishop.

=== Succession tree of the Franconian House of Hohenzollern ===
Table of the Royal Brandenburg-Prussian House of Hohenzollern

=== Franconian/Brandenburg-Prussian branch since 1918 abdication ===
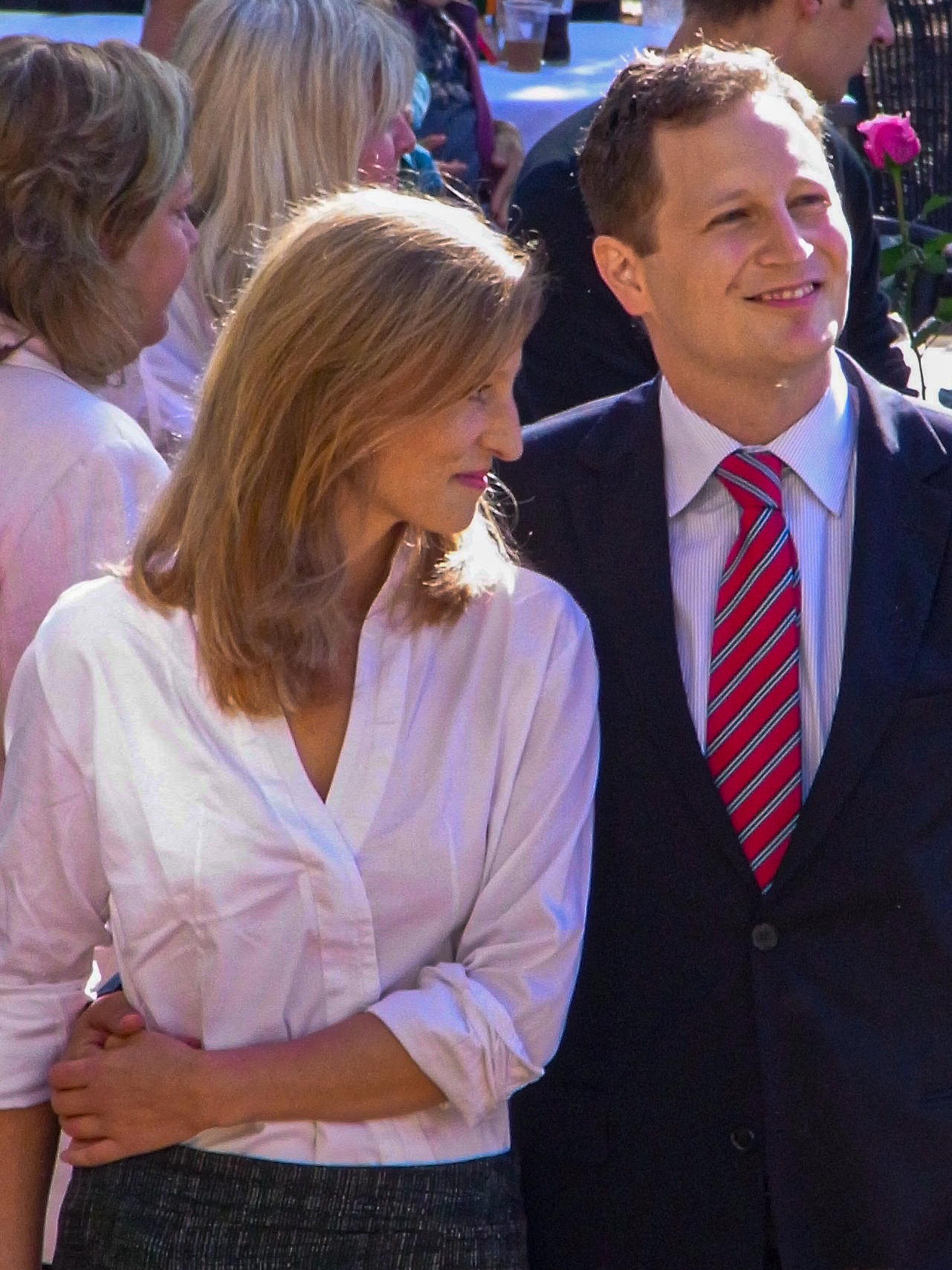
Georg Friedrich, the head of the Prussian Hohenzollerns, and his wife

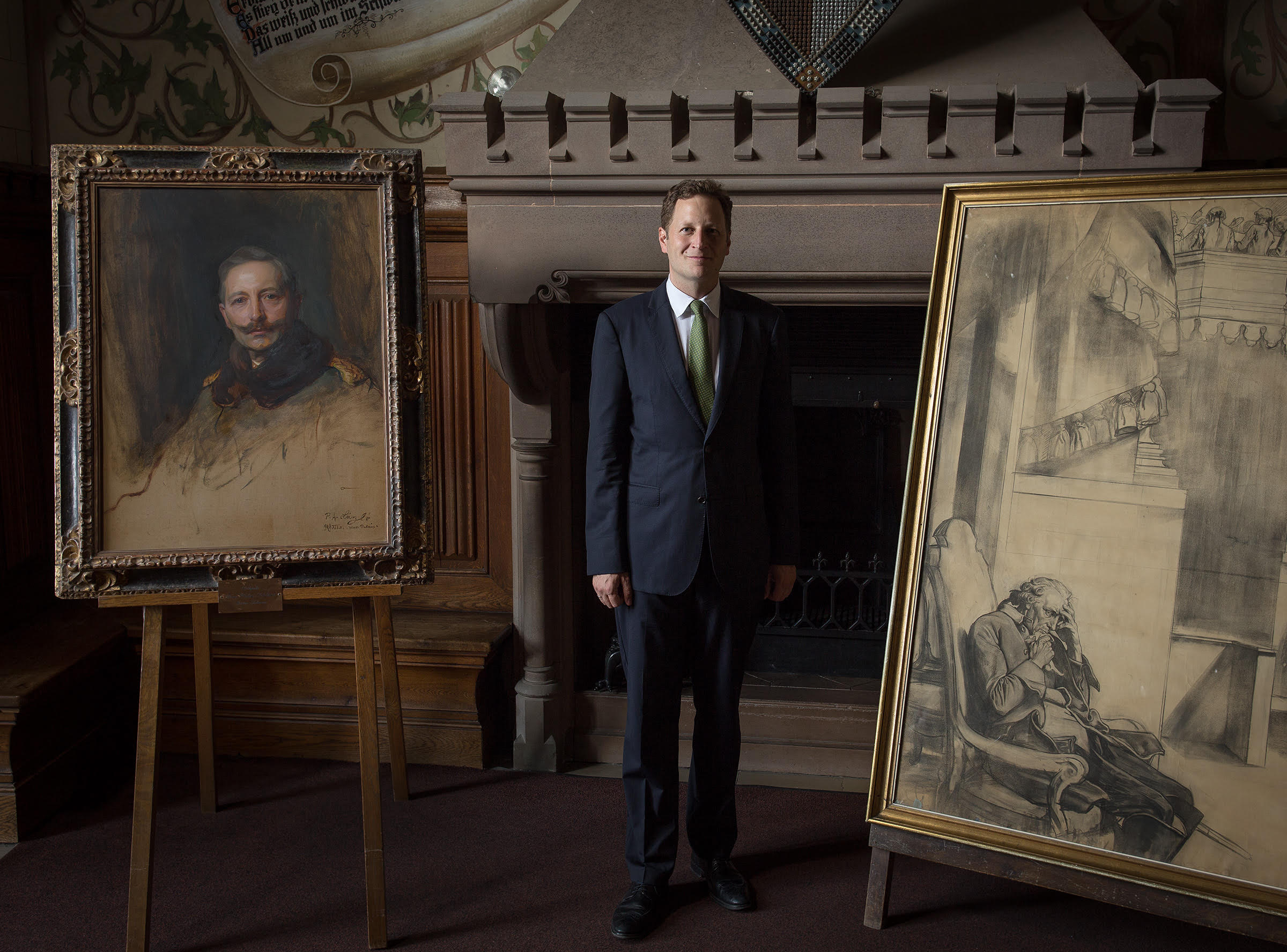
George Friedrich photographed by Oliver Mark in Hohenzollern Castle, Bisingen 2018

In June 1926, a referendum on expropriating the formerly ruling princes of Germany without compensation failed and as a consequence, the financial situation of the Hohenzollern family improved considerably. A settlement between the state and the family made Cecilienhof property of the state but granted a right of residence to Crown Prince Wilhelm and his wife Cecilie. The family also kept the ownership of Monbijou Palace in Berlin, Oleśnica Castle in Silesia, Rheinsberg Palace, Schwedt Palace and other property until 1945.

Since the abolition of the German monarchy, no Hohenzollern claims to imperial or royal prerogatives are recognized by Germany's Basic Law for the Federal Republic of Germany of 1949, which guarantees a republic.

The communist government of the Soviet occupation zone expropriated all landowners and industrialists; the House of Hohenzollern lost almost all of its fortune, retaining a few company shares and Hohenzollern Castle in West Germany. The Polish government appropriated the Silesian property and the Dutch government seized Huis Doorn, the Emperor's seat in exile.

After German reunification, however, the family was legally able to reclaim their portable property, namely art collections and parts of the interior of their former palaces. Negotiations on the return of or compensation for these assets are not yet completed.

The Berlin Palace, home of the German monarchs, was rebuilt in 2020. The Berlin Palace and the Humboldt Forum are located in the middle of Berlin.

==== Order of succession ====
Arms of George Friedrich as Prince of Prussia
(also often depicted without the central Hohenzollern shield, and just the "FR")

Name	Titular reign	Relation to predecessor
Wilhelm II	1918–1941	Succeeded himself as pretender to the throne.
Crown Prince Wilhelm	1941–1951	Son of
Louis Ferdinand, Prince of Prussia	1951–1994	Son of
Georg Friedrich, Prince of Prussia	since 1994	Grandson of
Carl Friedrich, Prince of Prussia	(heir apparent)	Son of

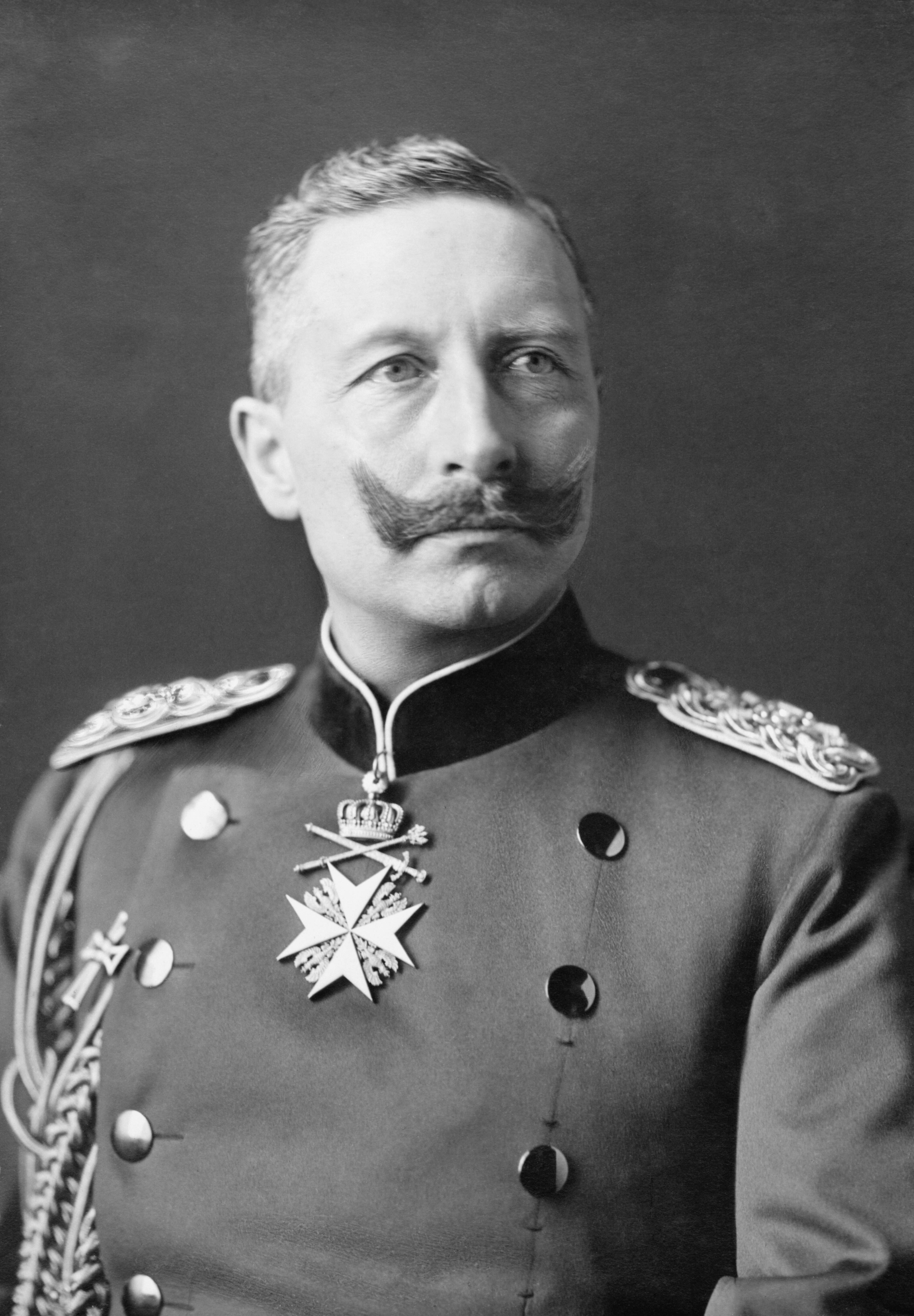
Wilhelm II, the last incumbent of the throne

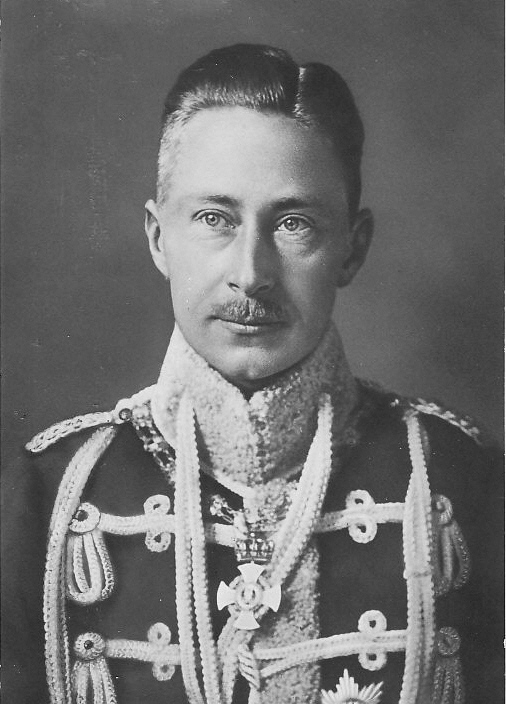
Crown Prinz Wilhelm

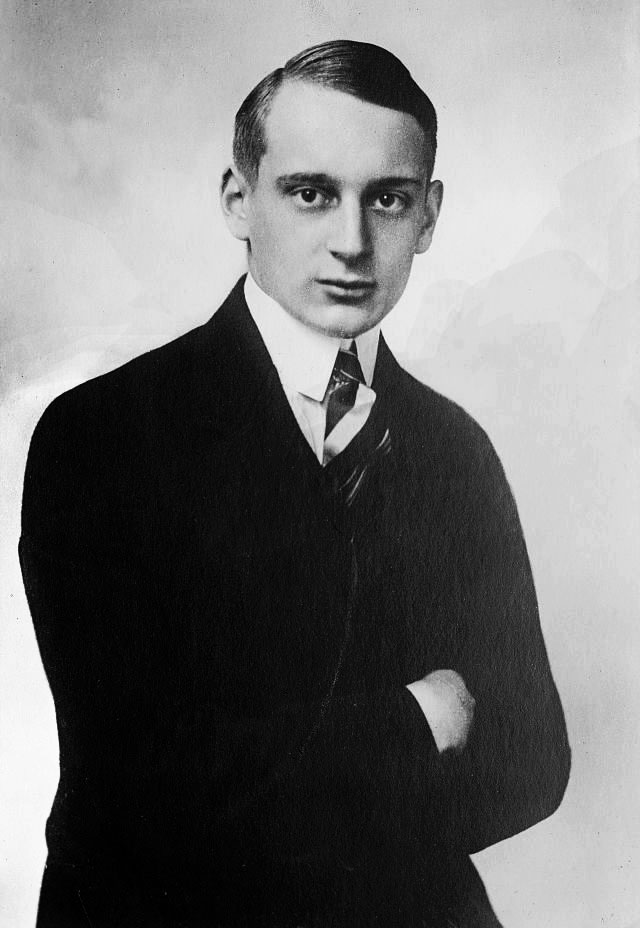
Louis Ferdinand

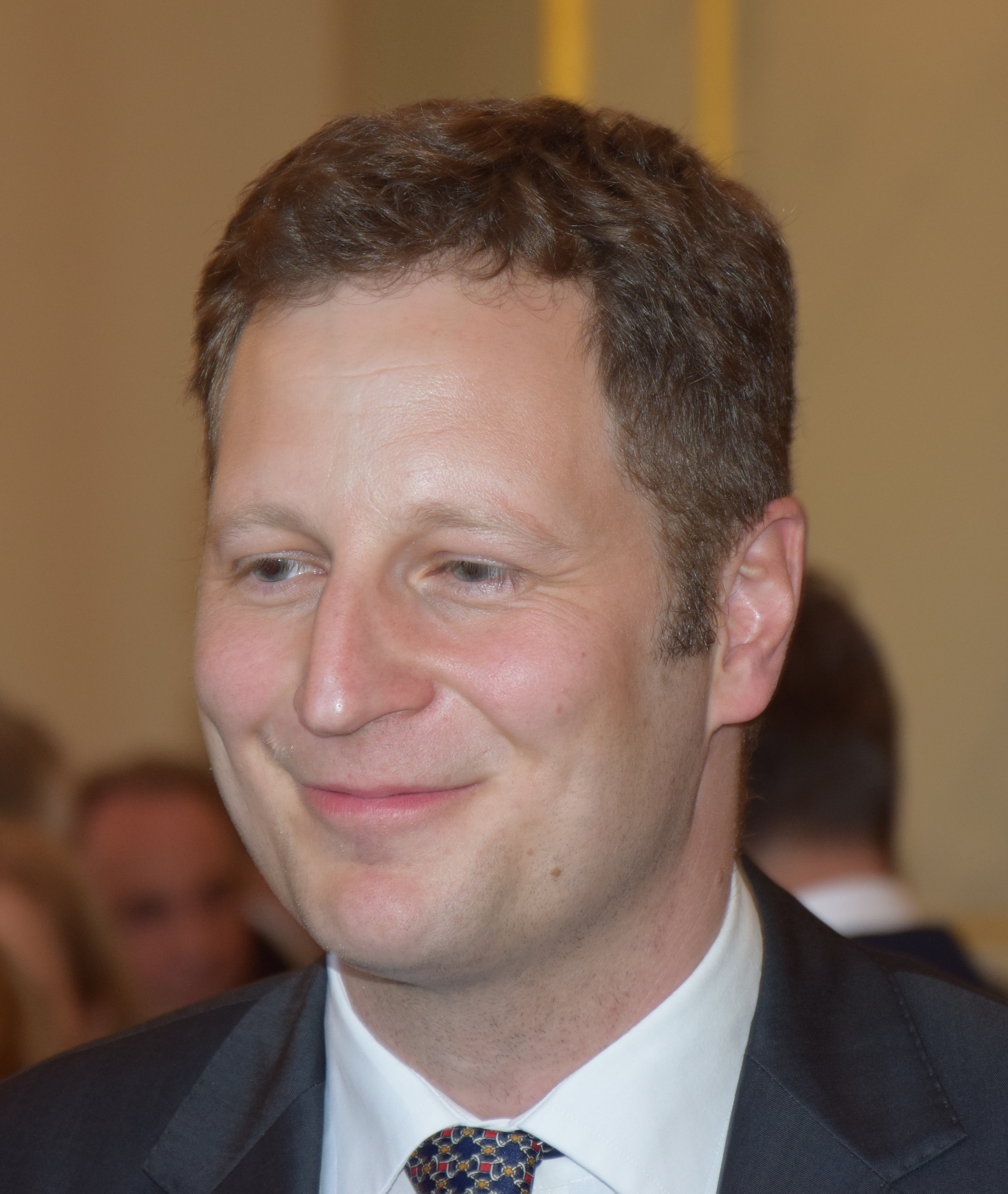
Georg Friedrich

The head of the house is the titular King of Prussia and German Emperor. He also bears a historical claim to the title of Prince of Orange. Members of this line style themselves princes of Prussia.

Georg Friedrich, Prince of Prussia, the current head of the royal Prussian House of Hohenzollern, was married to Princess Sophie of Isenburg on 27 August 2011. On 20 January 2013, she gave birth to twin sons, Carl Friedrich Franz Alexander and Louis Ferdinand Christian Albrecht, in Bremen. Carl Friedrich, the elder of the two, is the heir apparent.

==== Living legitimate members of the Prussian branch ====
Bold signifies heads of the house and numbers shown indicate the pretense to the kingship of Prussia and the German Empire:

- **William I** (1797–1888)
  - **Frederick III** (1831–1888)
    - **Wilhelm II** (1859–1941)
      - **Wilhelm, German Crown Prince** (1882–1951)
        - Prince Wilhelm of Prussia (1906–1940)
        - **Louis Ferdinand, Prince of Prussia** (1907–1994)
          - Prince Friedrich Wilhelm of Prussia (1939–2015), married non-dynastically and had issue
          - Prince Michael of Prussia (1940–2014), twice married non-dynastically and had issue
          - Princess Marie Cécile of Prussia (born 1942), married Duke Friedrich August of Oldenburg (1936–2017) and has issue
          - Princess Kira of Prussia (1943–2004), married Thomas Liepsner and had issue
          - Louis Ferdinand, Hereditary Prince of Prussia (1944–1977), married Countess Donata of Castell-Rüdenhausen and had issue
            - **Georg Friedrich, Prince of Prussia** (born 1976)
              - **(1)** Carl Friedrich, Hereditary Prince of Prussia (born 2013)
              - **(2)** Prince Louis Ferdinand of Prussia (born 2013)
              - Princess Emma Marie of Prussia (born 2015)
              - **(3)** Prince Heinrich Albert of Prussia (born 2016)
            - Princess Cornelie-Cécile of Prussia (born 1978)
          - **(4)** Prince Christian-Sigismund of Prussia (born 1946)
            - Princess Isabelle Alexandra of Prussia (born 1969)
            - **(5)** Prince Christian Ludwig of Prussia (born 1986)
            - Princess Irina of Prussia (born 1988)
          - Princess Xenia of Prussia (1949–1992), married Per-Edvard Lithander and had issue
        - Prince Hubertus of Prussia (1909–1950)
        - Prince Frederick of Prussia (1911–1966)
          - Prince Frederick Nicholas of Prussia (born 1946), married non-dynastically and has issue
          - Prince Andreas of Prussia (born 1947), married non-dynastically and has issue
          - Princess Victoria Marina of Prussia (born 1952), married Philippe Alphonse Achache (born 1945) and has issue
          - Prince Rupert of Prussia (born 1955), married non-dynastically and has issue
          - Princess Antonia of Prussia (born 1955), married Charles Wellesley, 9th Duke of Wellington (born 1945), and has issue
        - Princess Alexandrine of Prussia (1915–1980), unmarried without issue
        - Princess Cecilie of Prussia (1917–1975), married Clyde Kenneth Harris (1918–1958) and had issue
      - Prince Eitel Friedrich of Prussia (1883–1942), married Duchess Sophia Charlotte of Oldenburg (1879–1964) without issue
      - Prince Adalbert of Prussia (1884–1948)
        - Princess Victoria Marina of Prussia (1915)
        - Princess Victoria Marina of Prussia (1917–1981), married Kirby Patterson (1907–1984) and had issue
        - Prince Wilhelm Victor of Prussia (1919–1989)
          - Princess Marie Louise of Prussia (born 1945), married Count Rudolf of Schönburg-Glauchau and has issue
          - **(6)** Prince Adalbert of Prussia (born 1948)
            - **(7)** Prince Alexander of Prussia (born 1984)
            - **(8)** Prince Christian of Prussia (born 1986)
            - **(9)** Prince Philipp of Prussia (born 1986)
      - Prince August Wilhelm of Prussia (1887–1949)
        - Prince Alexander Ferdinand of Prussia (1912–1985)
          - Prince Stephan Alexander (1939–1993)
      - Prince Oskar of Prussia (1888–1958)
        - Prince Oskar of Prussia (1915–1939)
        - Prince Burchard of Prussia (1917–1988), married Countess Eleonore Fugger von Babenhausen without issue
        - Princess Herzeleide of Prussia (1918–1989), married Karl, Prince Biron von Courland (1907–1982), without issue
        - Prince Wilhelm Karl of Prussia (1922–2007)
          - Princess Donata of Prussia (1952–2026)
          - **(10)** Prince Wilhelm-Karl of Prussia (born 1955)
          - **(11)** Prince Oscar of Prussia (born 1959)
            - **(12)** Prince Oskar of Prussia (born 1993)
            - Princess Wilhelmine of Prussia (born 1995)
            - **(13)** Prince Albert of Prussia (born 1998)
      - Prince Joachim of Prussia (1890–1920)
        - Prince Karl Franz of Prussia (1916–1975)
          - **(14)** Prince Franz Wilhelm of Prussia (born 1944), married Grand Duchess Maria Vladimirovna of Russia (born 1953) and had issue and Nadia Nour El Etreby (born 1949) without issue
            - **(15)** Grand Duke George Mikhailovich of Russia (born 1981) married Rebecca Virginia Bettarini (born 1982) cr. The Princess Romanova
              - **(16)** Prince Alexander Georgievich Romanov (born 2022)
              - Princess Kira Leonida Georgievna Romanova (born 2025)
          - Prince Friedrich Christian of Prussia (1943)
          - **(17)** Prince Franz-Friedrich of Prussia (born 1944), married Gudrun Winkler (born 1949) without issue and Susann Genske (born 1964) without issue
          - Princess Alexandra Maria of Prussia (born 1960), married Alberto Reboa and has issue
          - Princess Désirée Anastasia of Prussia (born 1961), married Juan Carlos Gamarra y Skeels (born 1954) and has issue
      - Princess Victoria Louise of Prussia (1892–1980), married Ernest Augustus, Duke of Brunswick (1887–1953), and had issue
    - Princess Charlotte of Prussia (1860–1919), married Bernhard III, Duke of Saxe-Meiningen (1860–1919), and had issue
    - Prince Henry of Prussia (1862–1929)
      - Prince Waldemar of Prussia (1889–1945), married Princess Calixta of Lippe-Biesterfeld (1895–1982) without issue
      - Prince Sigismund of Prussia (1896–1978)
        - Princess Barbara of Prussia (1920–1994), married Duke Christian Louis of Mecklenburg (1912–1996) and had issue
        - Prince Alfred of Prussia (1924–2013), married Maritza Farkas (1929–1996) without issue
      - Prince Henry of Prussia (1900–1904)
    - Prince Sigismund of Prussia (1864–1866)
    - Princess Viktoria of Prussia (1866–1929), married Prince Adolf of Schaumburg-Lippe (1859–1916) without issue and Alexander Zoubkoff without issue
    - Prince Waldemar of Prussia (1868–1879)
    - Princess Sophia of Prussia (1870–1932), married Constantine I of Greece (1868–1923) and had issue
    - Princess Margaret of Prussia (1872–1954), married Prince Frederick Charles of Hesse (1868–1940) and had issue
  - Princess Louise of Prussia (1838–1923), married Frederick I, Grand Duke of Baden (1851–1928), and had issue

== Swabian branch ==
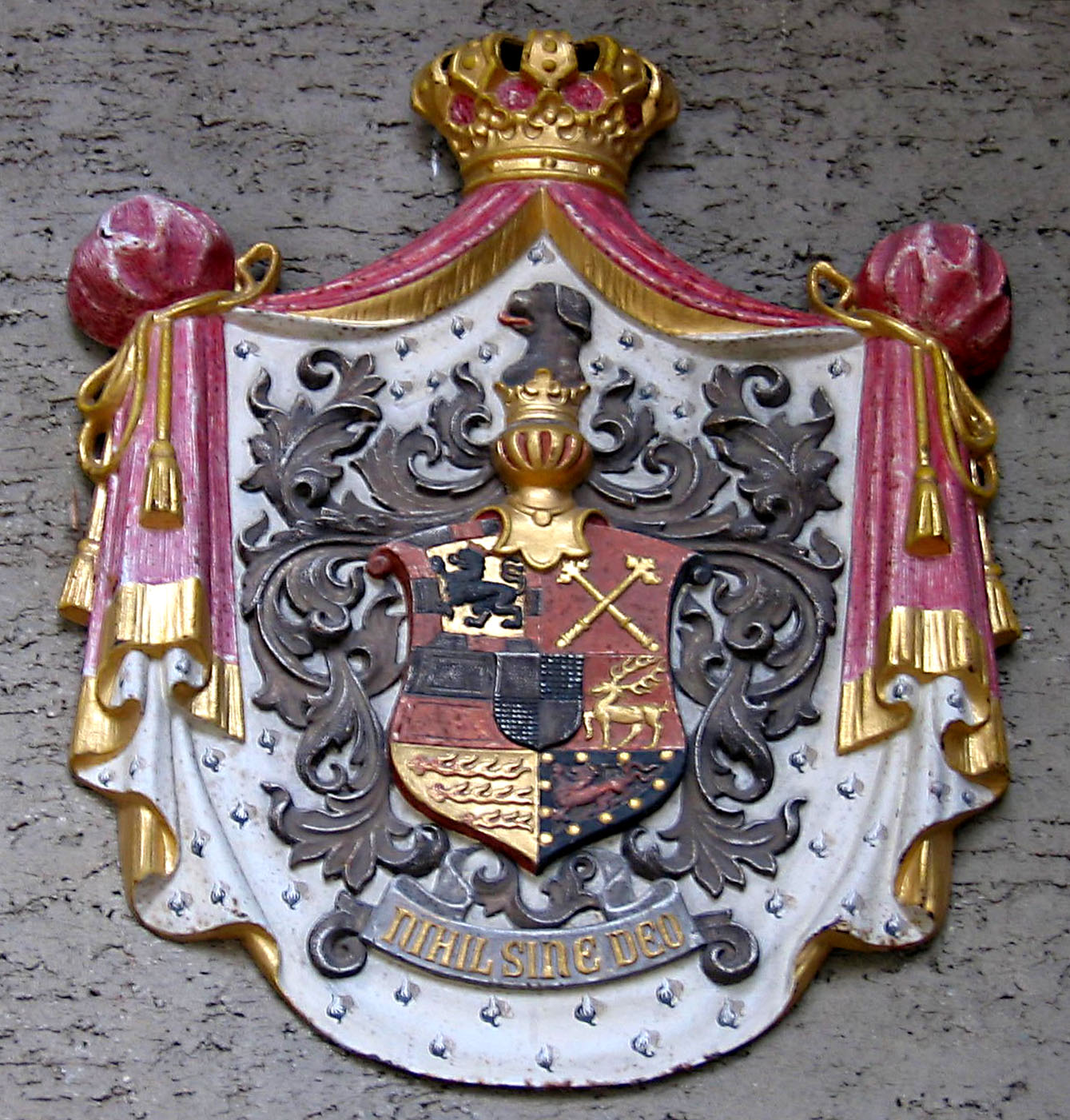
Combined coat of arms of the House of Hohenzollern-Sigmaringen (1849)

The cadet Swabian branch of the House of Hohenzollern was founded by Frederick IV, Count of Zollern. The family ruled three territories with seats at, respectively, Hechingen, Sigmaringen and Haigerloch. The counts were elevated to princes in 1623. The Swabian branch of the Hohenzollerns is Catholic.

Affected by economic problems and internal feuds, the Hohenzollern counts from the 14th century onwards came under pressure by their neighbors, the Counts of Württemberg and the cities of the Swabian League, whose troops besieged and finally destroyed Hohenzollern Castle in 1423. Nevertheless, the Hohenzollerns retained their estates, backed by their Brandenburg cousins and the Imperial House of Habsburg. In 1535, Count Charles I of Hohenzollern (1512–1576) received the counties of Sigmaringen and Veringen as Imperial fiefs.

In 1576, when Charles I, Count of Hohenzollern died, his county was divided to form the three Swabian branches. Eitel Frederick IV took Hohenzollern with the title of Hohenzollern-Hechingen, Karl II took Sigmaringen and Veringen, and Christopher got Haigerloch. Christopher's family died out in 1634.

- Eitel Frederick IV of Hohenzollern-Hechingen (1545–1605)
- Charles II of Hohenzollern-Sigmaringen (1547–1606)
- Christopher of Hohenzollern-Haigerloch (1552–1592)

In 1695, the remaining two Swabian branches entered into an agreement with the Margrave of Brandenburg, which provided that if both branches became extinct, the principalities should fall to Brandenburg. Because of the Revolutions of 1848, Constantine, Prince of Hohenzollern-Hechingen and Karl Anton, Prince of Hohenzollern-Sigmaringen abdicated their thrones in December 1849. The principalities were ruled by the Kings of Prussia from December 1849 onwards, with the Hechingen and Sigmaringen branches obtaining official treatment as cadets of the Prussian royal family.

The Hohenzollern-Hechingen branch became extinct in 1869. A descendant of this branch was Countess Sophie Chotek, morganatic wife of Archduke Franz Ferdinand of Austria-Lotharingen.

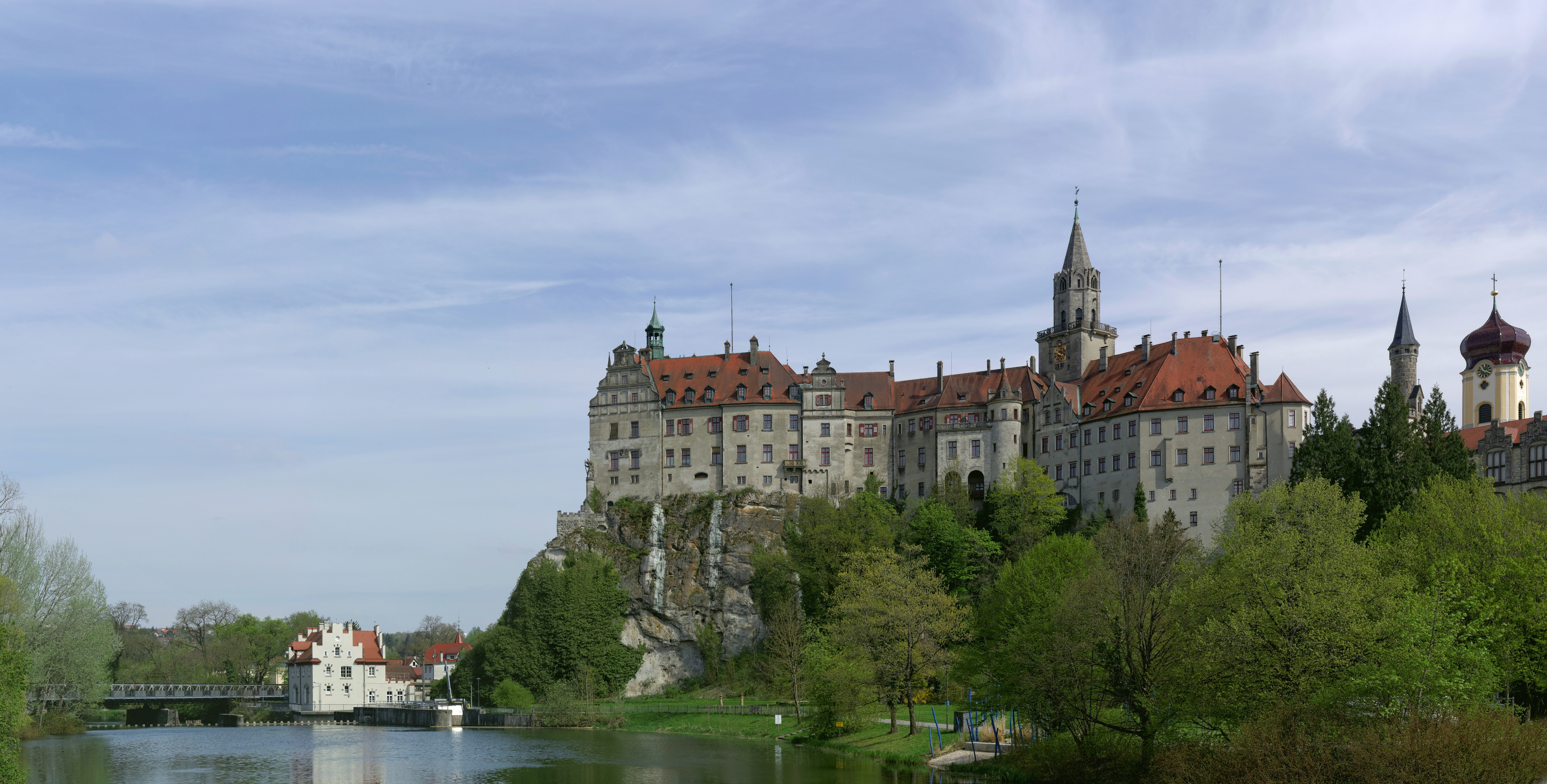
Sigmaringen Castle

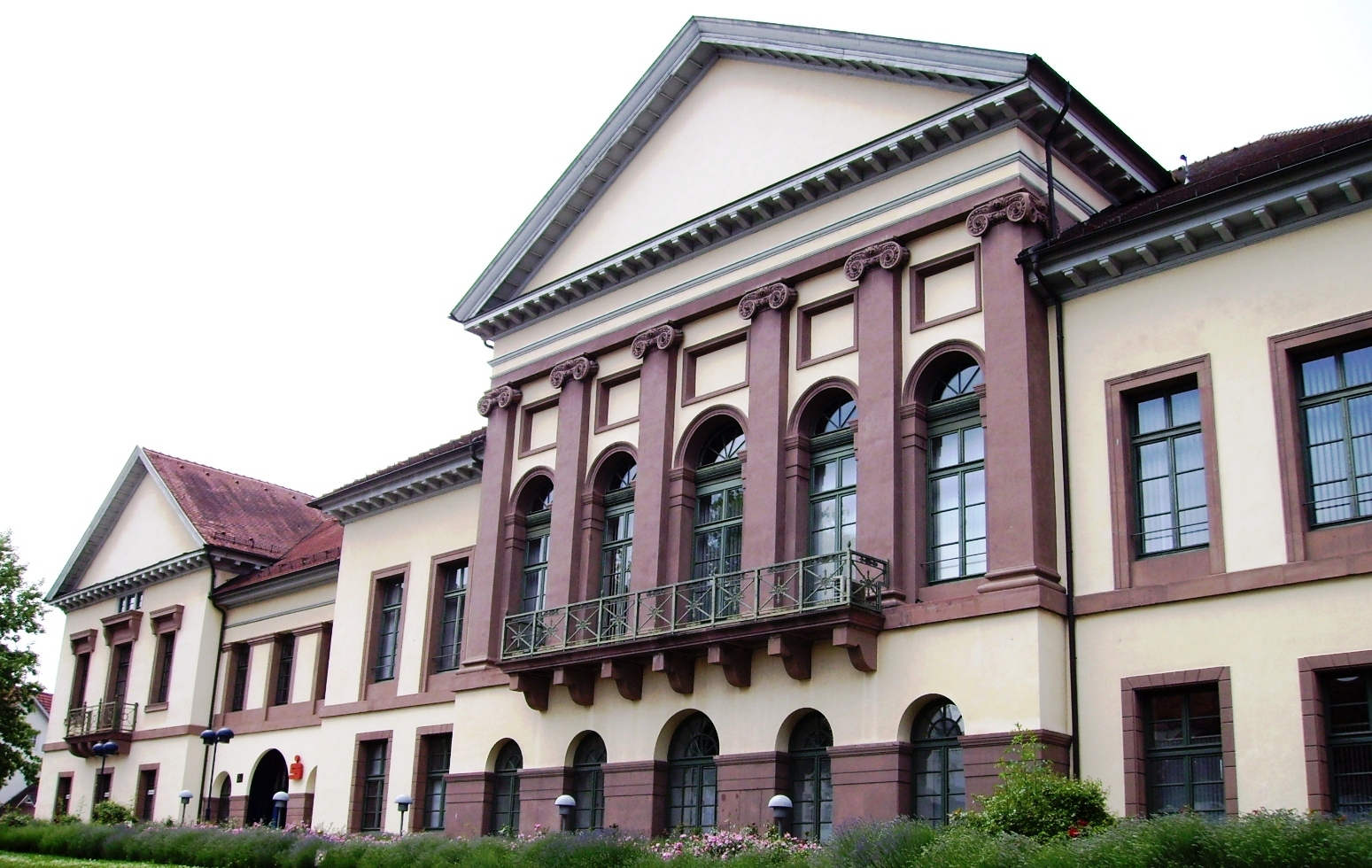
The New Castle, Hechingen

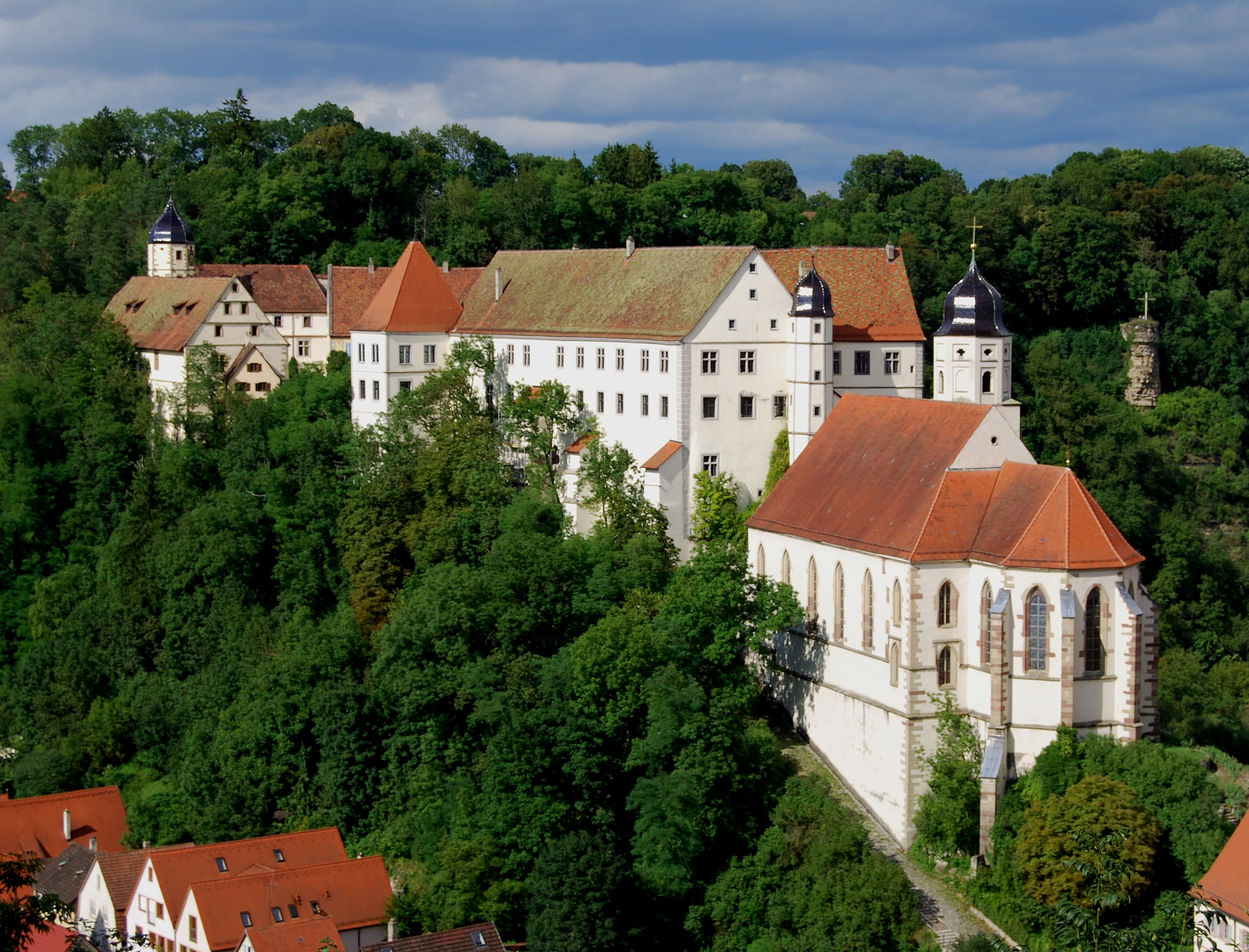
Haigerloch Castle

=== Counts of Hohenzollern (1204–1575) ===
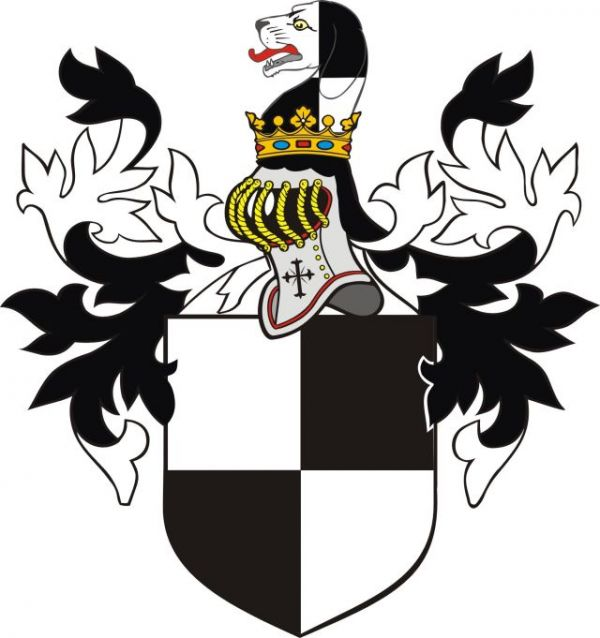

Hohenzollern region, in present-day Baden-Württemberg, Germany (red color) and their Prussian cousins' kingdom (light beige)

In 1204, the County of Hohenzollern was established out of the fusion of the County of Zollern and the Burgraviate of Nuremberg. The Swabian branch inherited the county of Zollern and, being descended from Frederick I of Nuremberg, were all named "Friedrich" down through the 11th generation. Each one's numeral is counted from the first Friedrich to rule his branch's appanage.

The most senior of these in the 14th century, Count Frederick VIII (d. 1333), had two sons, the elder of whom became Frederick IX (d. 1379), first Count of Hohenzollern, and fathered Friedrich X who left no sons when he died in 1412.

But the younger son of Friedrich VIII, called Friedrich of Strassburg, uniquely, took no numeral of his own, retaining the old title "Count of Zollern" and pre-deceased his brother in 1364/65. Prince Wilhelm Karl zu Isenburg's 1957 genealogical series, Europäische Stammtafeln, says Friedrich of Strassburg shared, rather, in the rule of Zollern with his elder brother until his premature death.

It appears, but is not stated, that Strassburg's son became the recognized co-ruler of his cousin Friedrich X (as compensation for having received no appanage and/or because of incapacity on the part of Friedrich X) and, as such, assumed (or is, historically, attributed) the designation Frederick XI although he actually pre-deceased Friedrich X, dying in 1401.

Friedrich XI, however, left two sons who jointly succeeded their cousin-once-removed, being Count Frederick XII (d. childless 1443) and Count Eitel Friedrich I (d. 1439), the latter becoming the ancestor of all subsequent branches of the Princes of Hohenzollern.

In the 12th century, a son of Frederick I secured the county of Hohenberg. The county remained in the possession of the family until 1486.

The influence of the Swabian line was weakened by several partitions of its lands. In the 16th century, the situation changed completely when Eitel Frederick II, a friend and adviser of the emperor Maximilian I, received the district of Haigerloch. His grandson Charles I was granted the counties of Sigmaringen and Vehringen by Charles V.

==== Counts, later Princes of Hohenzollern-Hechingen (1576–1849) ====
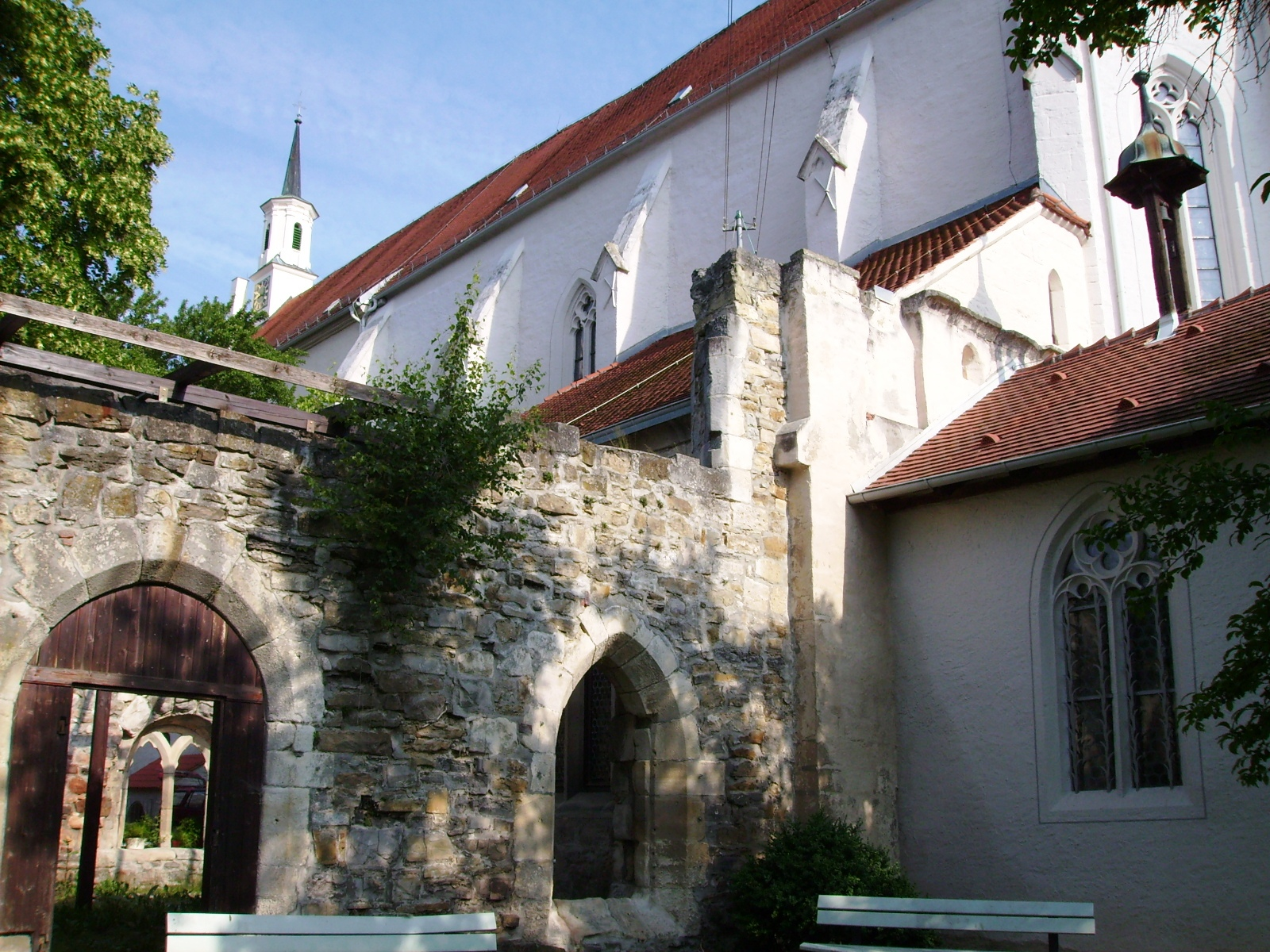
Stetten Abbey church in Hechingen, the burial place of the Swabian line

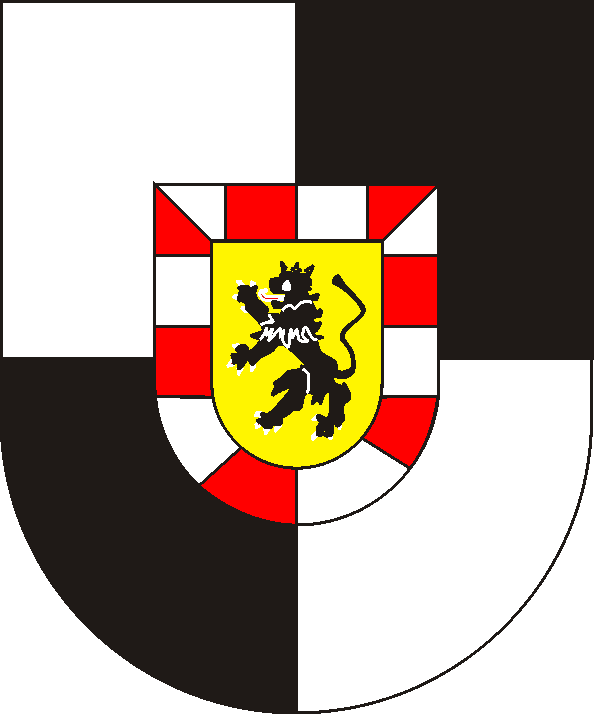

The County of Hohenzollern-Hechingen was established in 1576 with allodial rights. It included the original County of Zollern, with the Hohenzollern Castle and the monastery at Stetten.

In December 1849, the ruling princes of both Hohenzollern-Hechingen and Hohenzollern-Sigmaringen abdicated their thrones, and their principalities were incorporated as the Prussian province of Hohenzollern. The Hechingen branch became extinct in dynastic line with Konstantin's death in 1869.

==== Counts of Hohenzollern-Haigerloch (1576–1634 and 1681–1767) ====

The County of Hohenzollern-Haigerloch was established in 1576 without allodial rights.

Between 1634 and 1681, the county was temporarily integrated into the principality of Hohenzollern-Sigmaringen.

Upon the death of Francis Christopher Anton in 1767, the Haigerloch territory was incorporated into the principality of Hohenzollern-Sigmaringen.

==== Counts, later Princes of Hohenzollern-Sigmaringen (1576–1849) ====
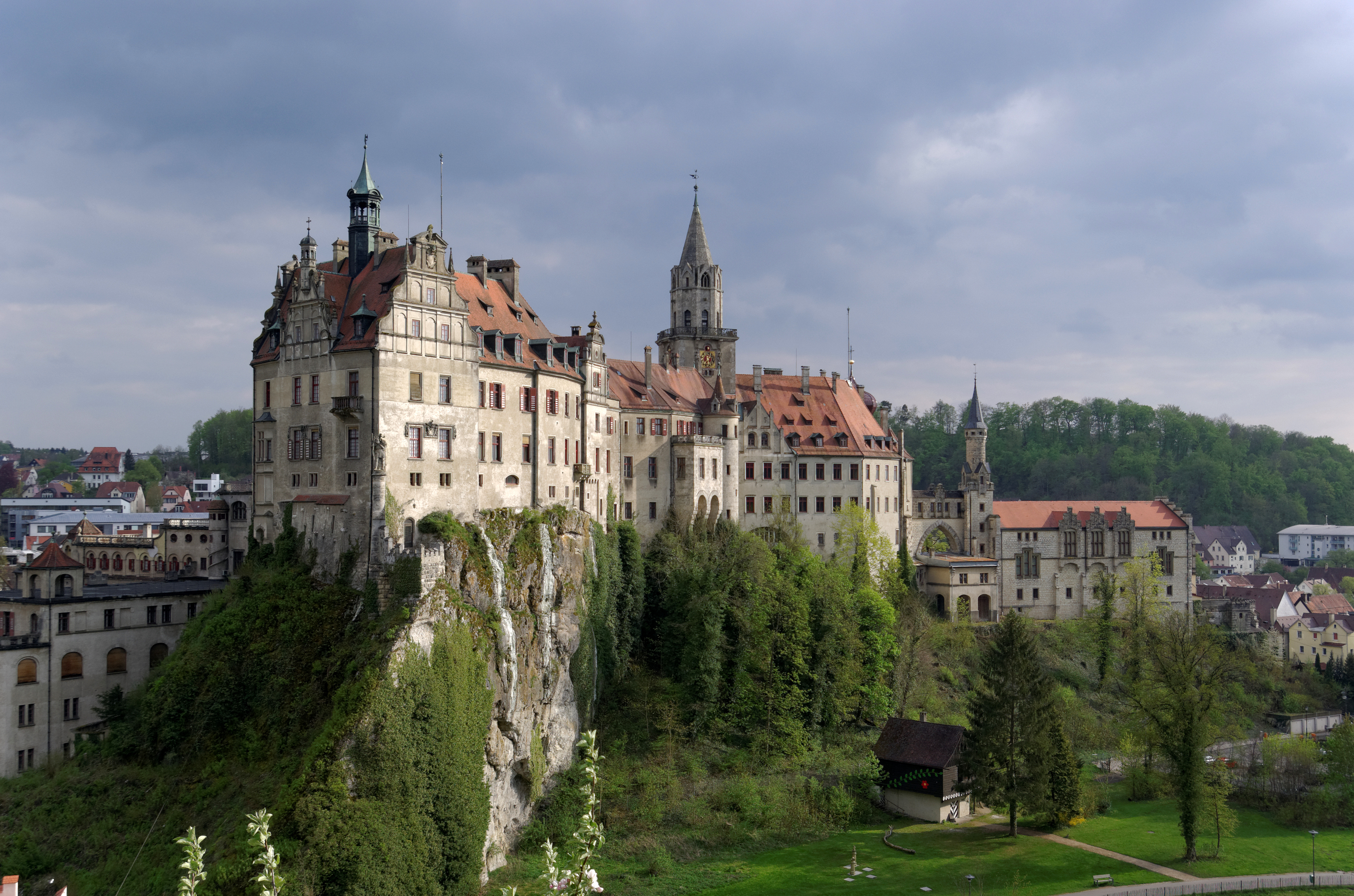
Sigmaringen Castle

The County of Hohenzollern-Sigmaringen was established in 1576 with allodial rights and a seat at Sigmaringen Castle.

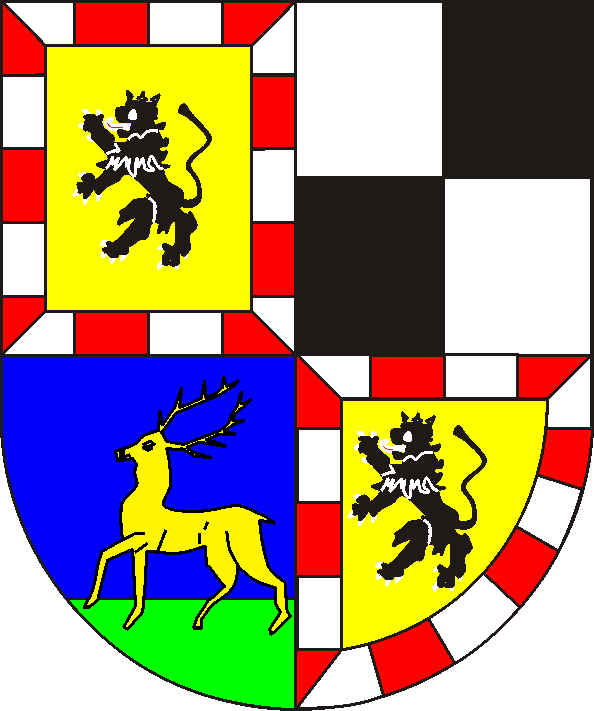

In December 1849, sovereignty over the principality was yielded to the Franconian branch of the family and incorporated into the Kingdom of Prussia, which accorded status as cadets of the Prussian Royal Family to the Swabian Hohenzollerns. The last ruling Prince of Hohenzollern-Sigmaringen, Karl Anton, would later serve as Minister President of Prussia between 1858 and 1862.

=== House of Hohenzollern-Sigmaringen after 1849 ===
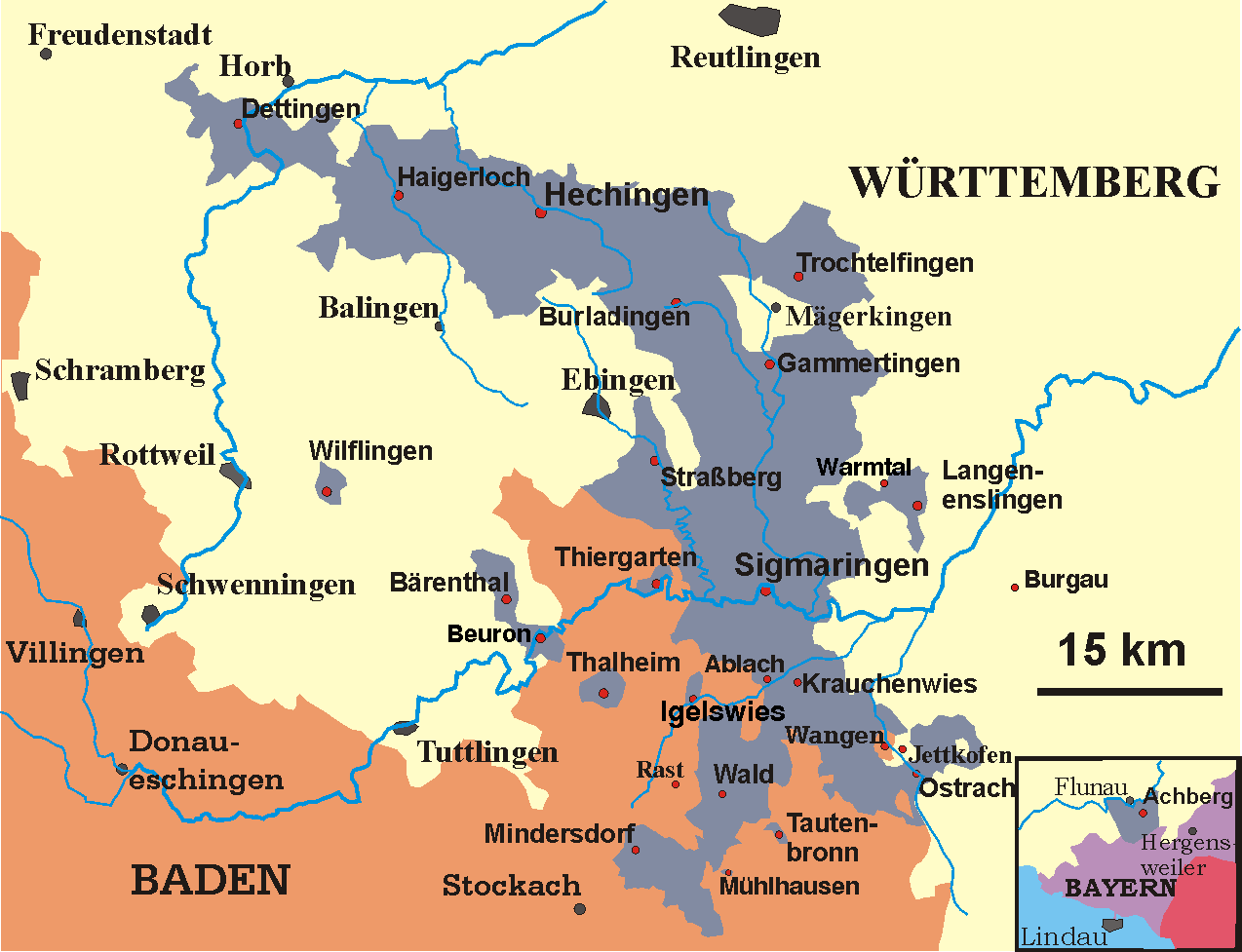
Map of the Prussian Province of Hohenzollern after 1850

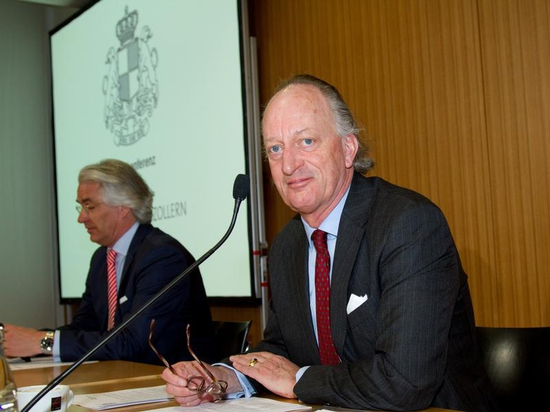
Karl Friedrich, Prince of Hohenzollern, head of the Swabian branch

The family continued to use the title of Prince of Hohenzollern-Sigmaringen. After the Hechingen branch became extinct in 1869, the Sigmaringen branch adopted title of Prince of Hohenzollern.

- 1849–1885: Karl Anton I (1811–1885)
- 1885–1905: Leopold I (1835–1905), son of
- 1905–1927: William I (1864–1927), son of
- 1927–1965: Frederick I (1891–1965), son of
- 1965–2010: Friedrich Wilhelm I (1924–2010), son of
- 2010–present: Karl Friedrich I (1952–), son of
- heir apparent: Alexander

In 1866, Prince Charles of Hohenzollern-Sigmaringen was chosen prince of Romania, becoming King Carol I of Romania in 1881.

Charles's elder brother, Leopold, Prince of Hohenzollern, was offered the Spanish throne in 1870 after a revolt exiled Isabella II in 1868. Although encouraged by Bismarck to accept, Leopold declined in the face of French opposition. Nonetheless, Bismarck altered and then published the Ems telegram to create a casus belli: France declared war, but Bismarck's Germany won the Franco-Prussian War.

The head of the Sigmaringen branch (the only extant line of the Swabian branch of the dynasty) is Karl Friedrich, styled His Highness The Prince of Hohenzollern. His official seat is Sigmaringen Castle.

=== Kings of the Romanians ===

==== Reigning (1866–1947) ====
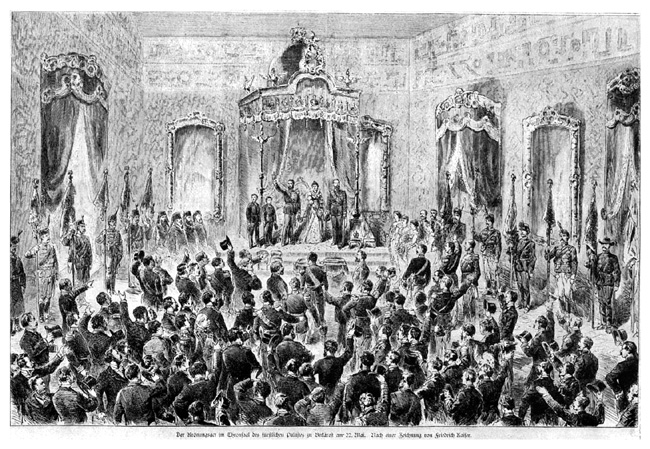
Coronation of Carol I in Bucharest

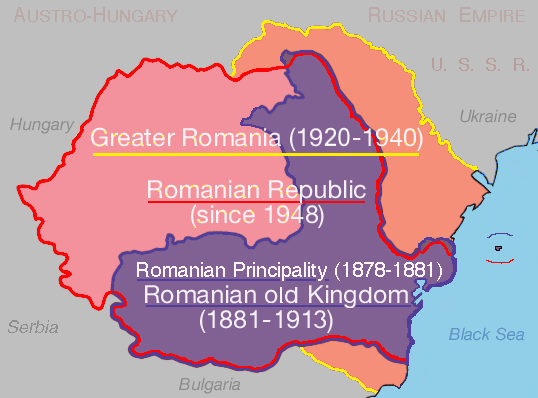
Evolution of Romania

The Principality of Romania was established in 1862, after the Ottoman vassal states of Wallachia and Moldavia had been united in 1859 under Alexandru Ioan Cuza as Prince of Romania in a personal union. He was deposed in 1866 by the Romanian parliament.

Prince Charles of Hohenzollern-Sigmaringen was invited to become reigning Prince of Romania in 1866. In 1881 he became Carol I, King of Romania. Carol I had an only daughter who died young, so the younger son of his brother Leopold, Prince Ferdinand of Hohenzollern-Sigmaringen, would succeed his uncle as King of Romania in 1914, and his descendants, having converted to the Orthodox Church, continued to reign there until the end of the monarchy in 1947.

==== Succession since 1947 ====
In 1947, the King Michael I abdicated and the country was proclaimed a People's Republic. Michael did not press his claim to the defunct Romanian throne, but he was welcomed back to the country after half a century in exile as a private citizen, with substantial former royal properties being placed at his disposal. However, his dynastic claim was not recognized by post-Communist Romanians.

On 10 May 2011, King Michael I severed the dynastic ties between the Romanian Royal Family and the House of Hohenzollern-Sigmaringen. After that the branch of the Hohenzollerns was dynastically represented only by the last king Michael, and his daughters. Having no sons, he declared that his dynastic heir, instead of being a male member of the Hohenzollern-Sigmaringen princely family to which he formerly belonged patrilineally and in accordance with the last Romanian monarchical constitution, should be his eldest daughter Margareta.

The royal house remains popular in Romania and in 2014 Prime Minister Victor Ponta promised a referendum on whether or not to reinstate the monarchy if he were re-elected.

== Rulers of the House of Hohenzollern ==
Partitions of the House of Hohenzollern

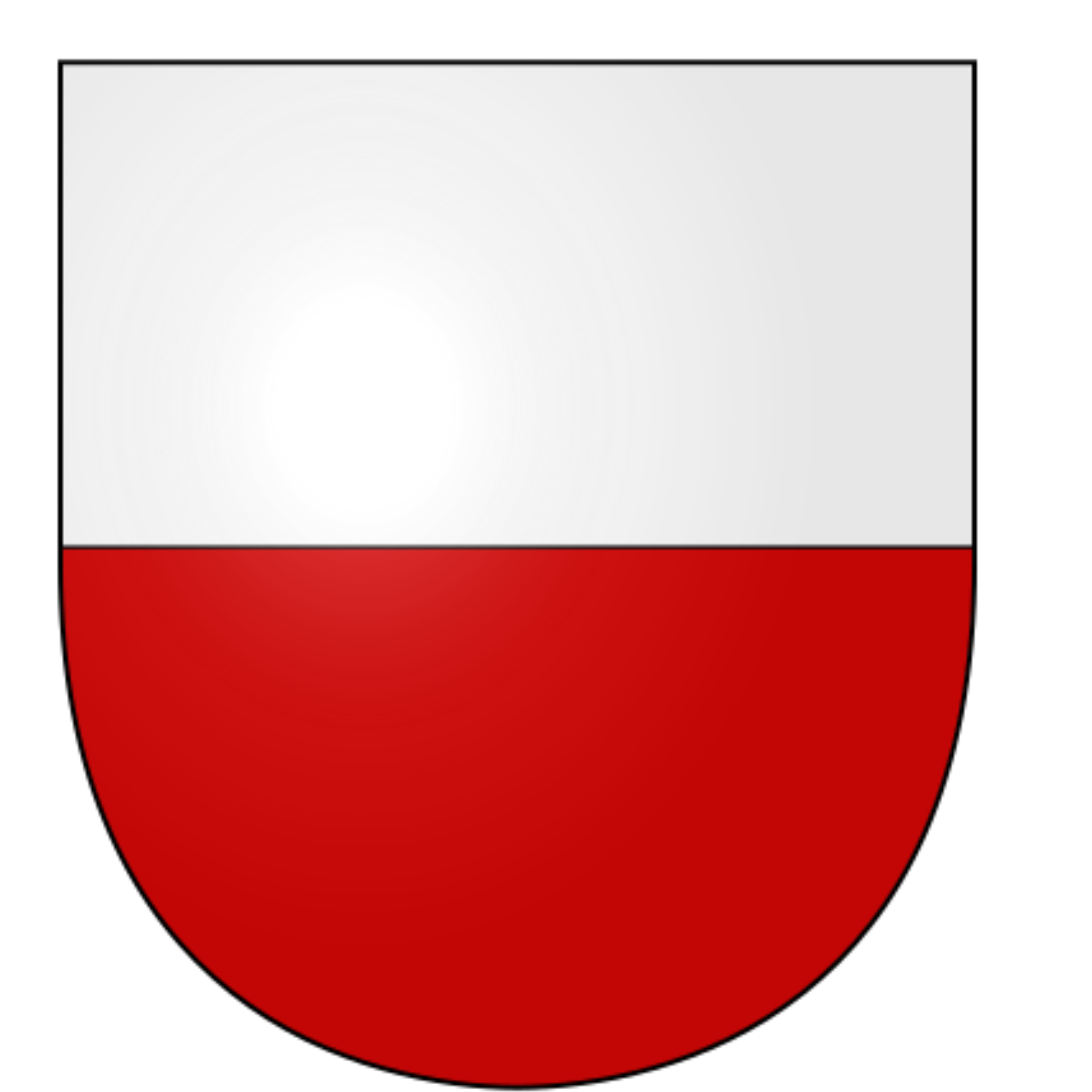
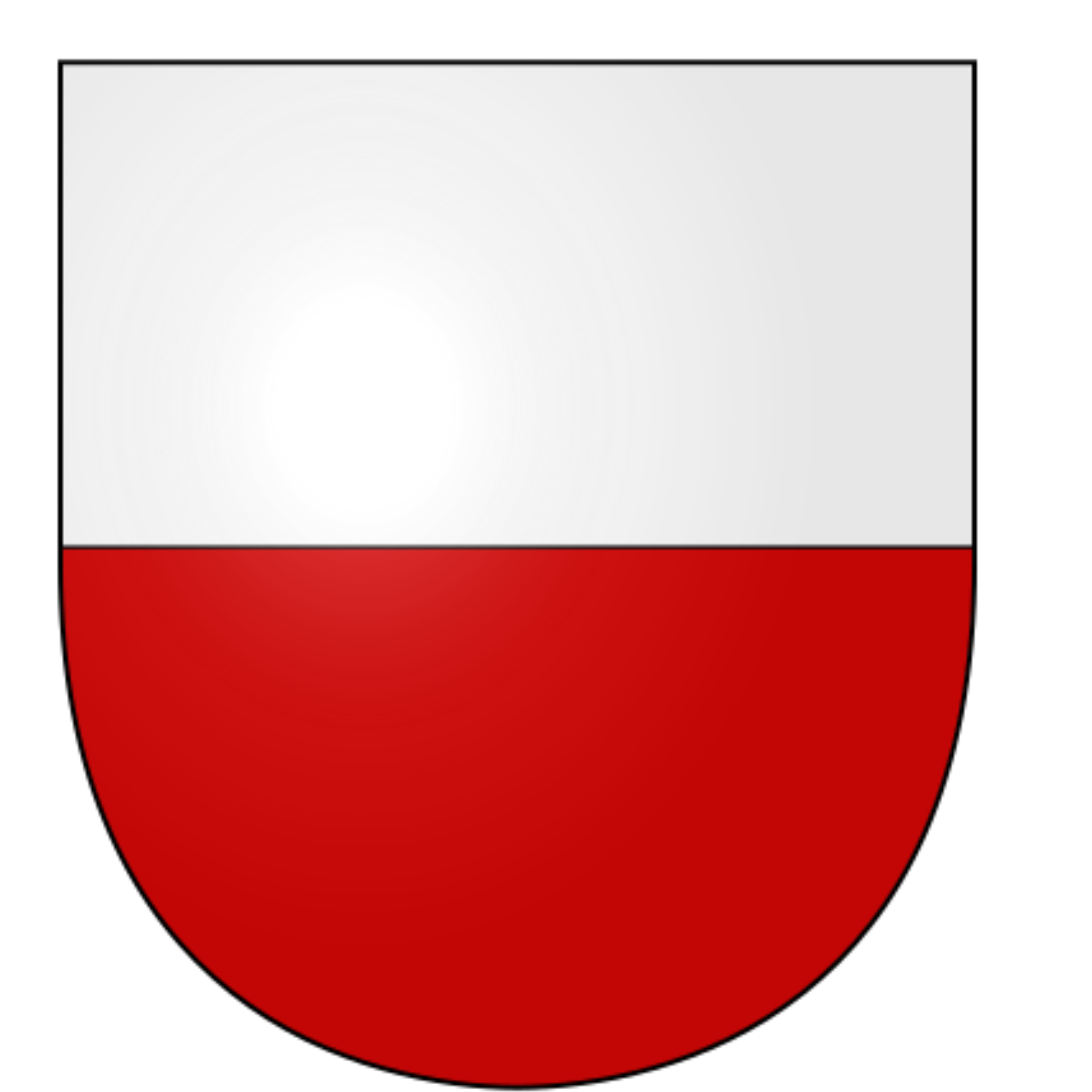
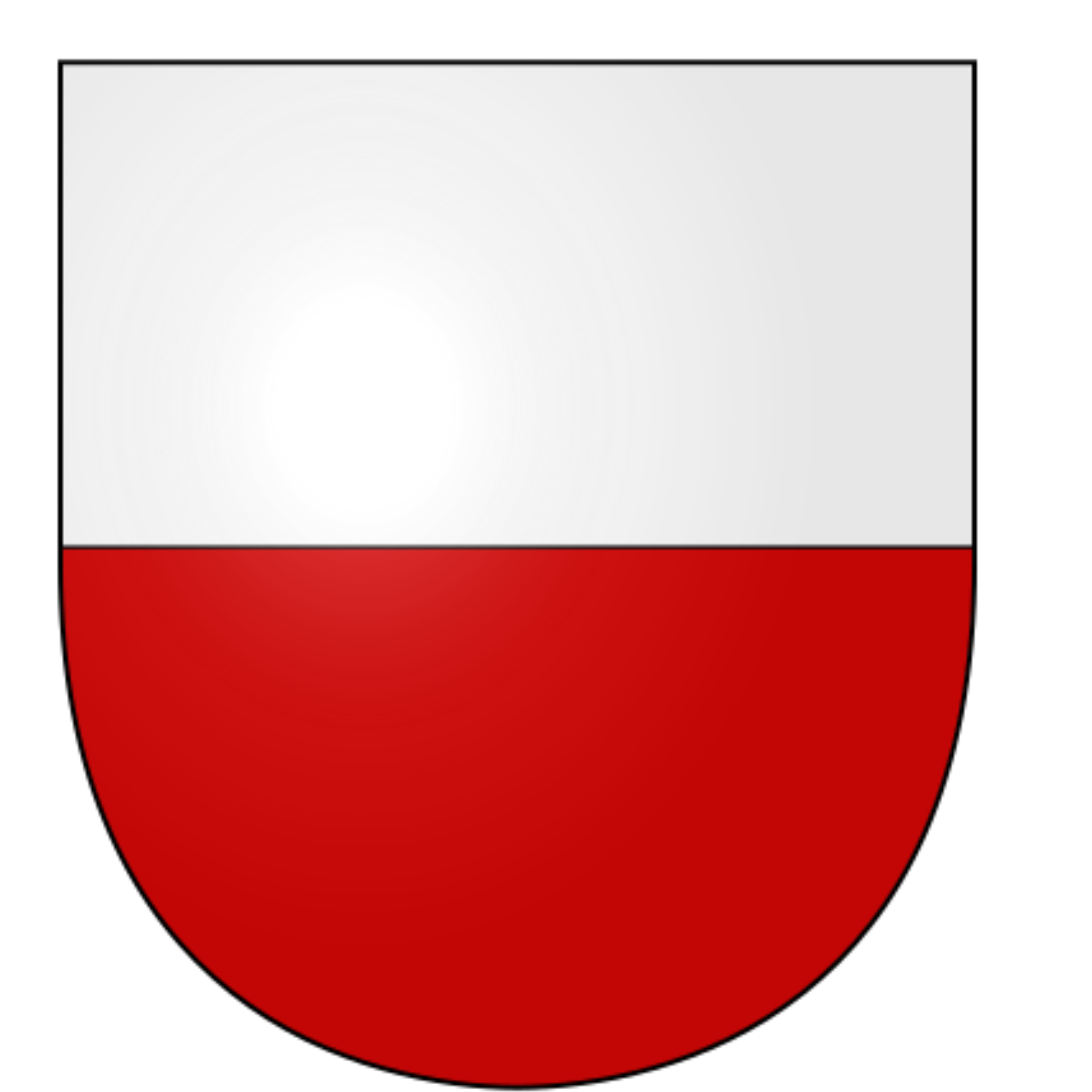
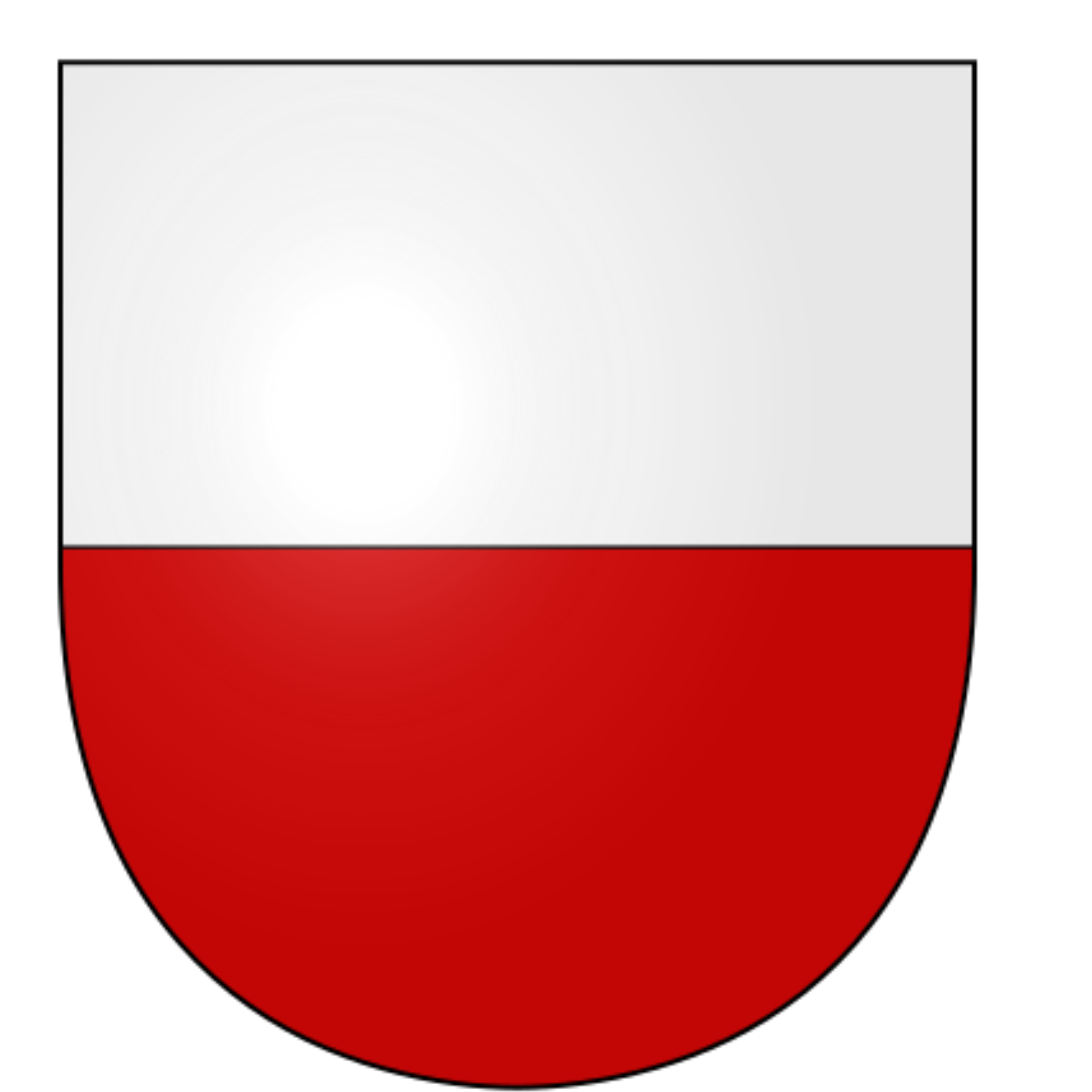
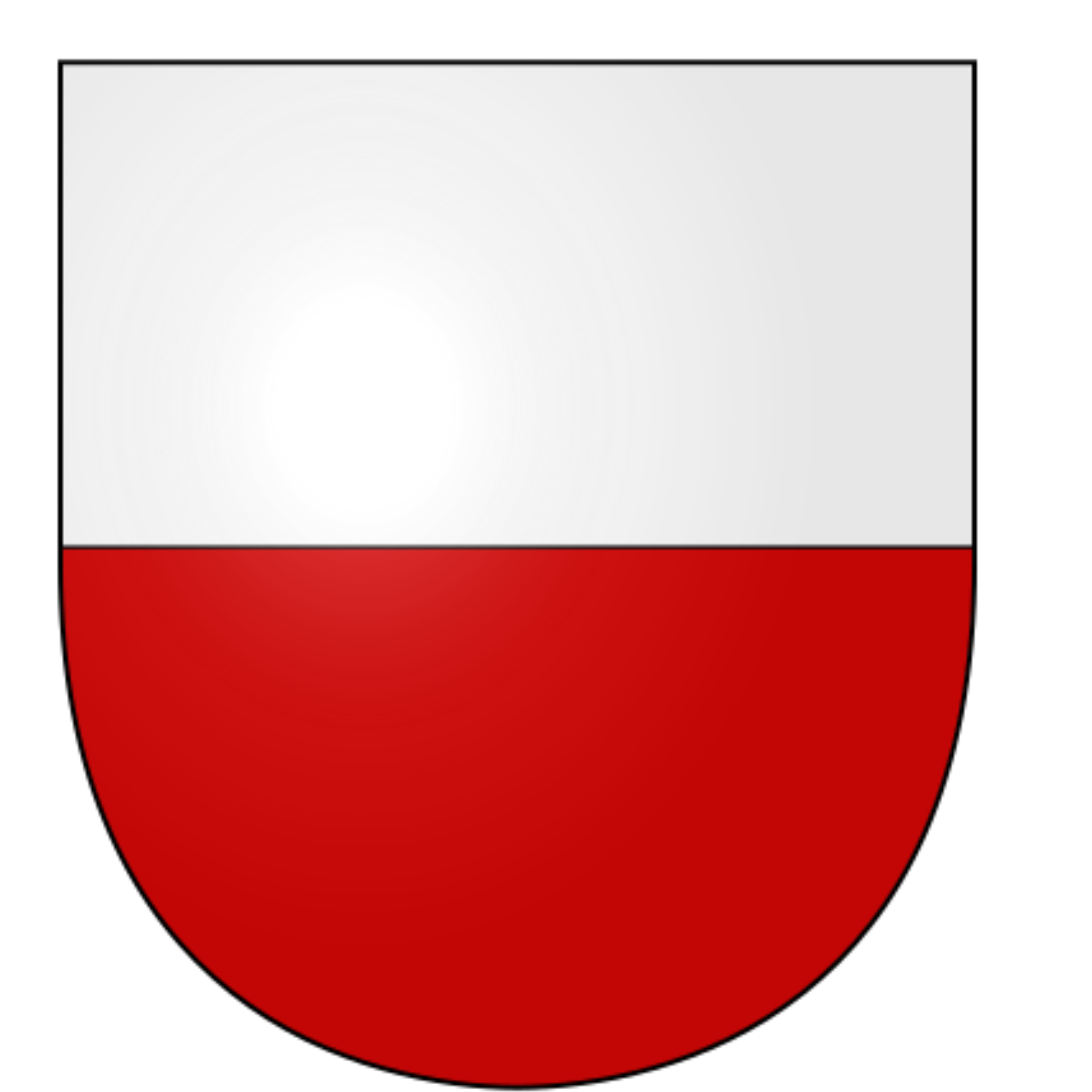
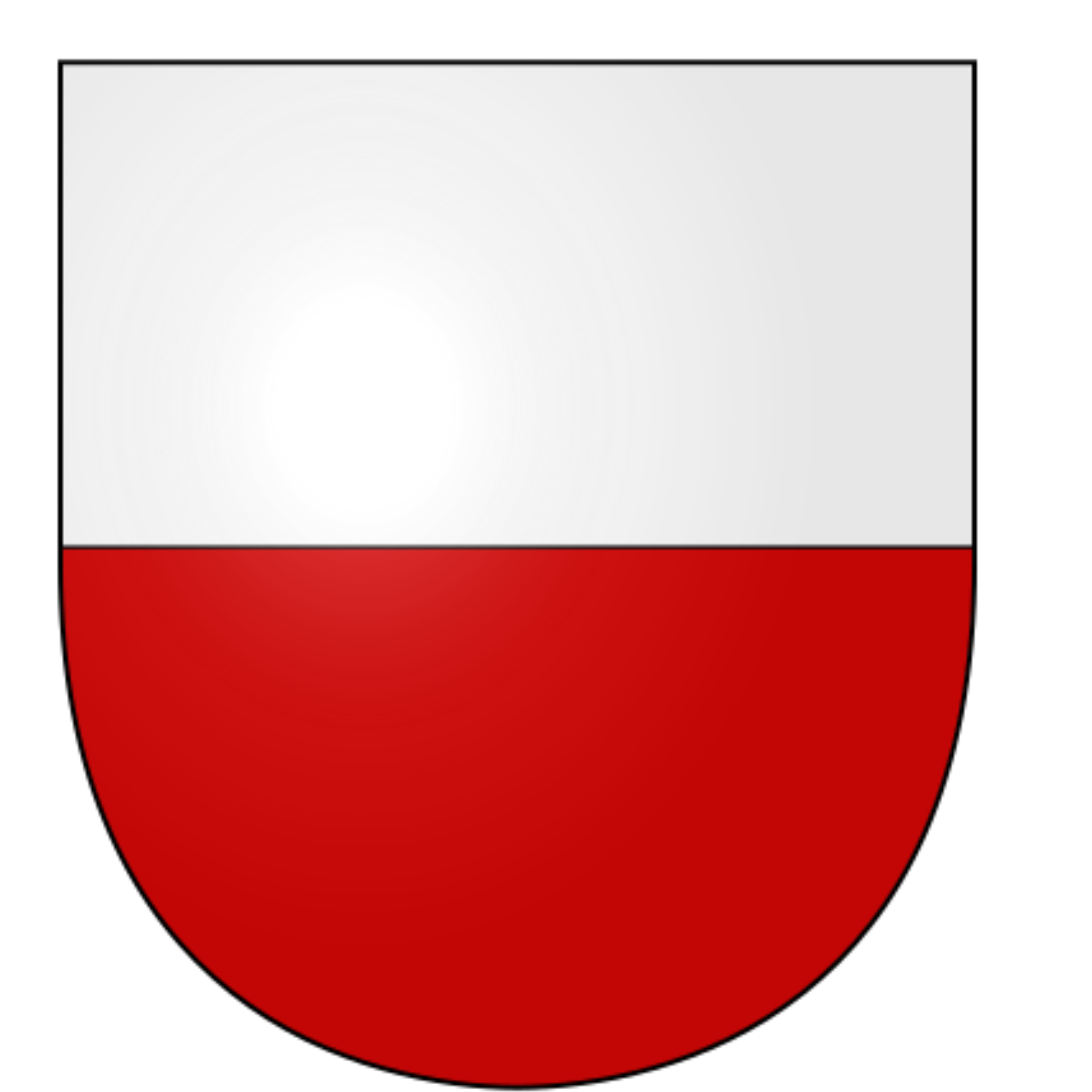
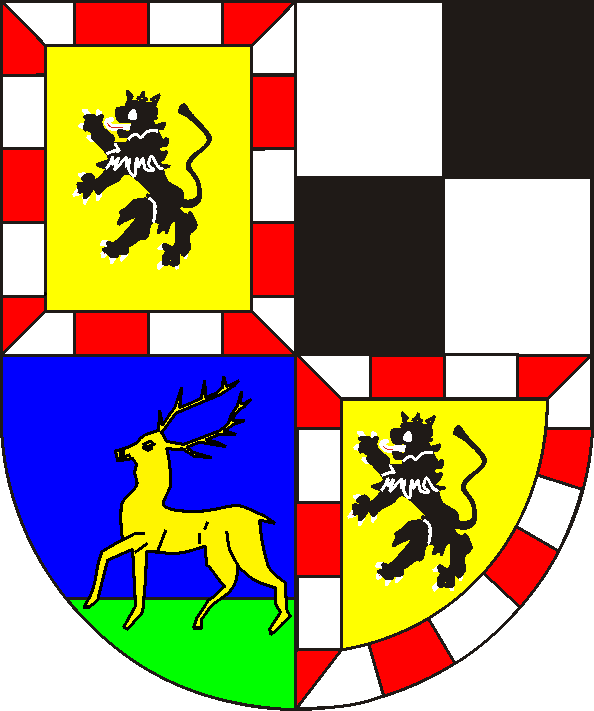
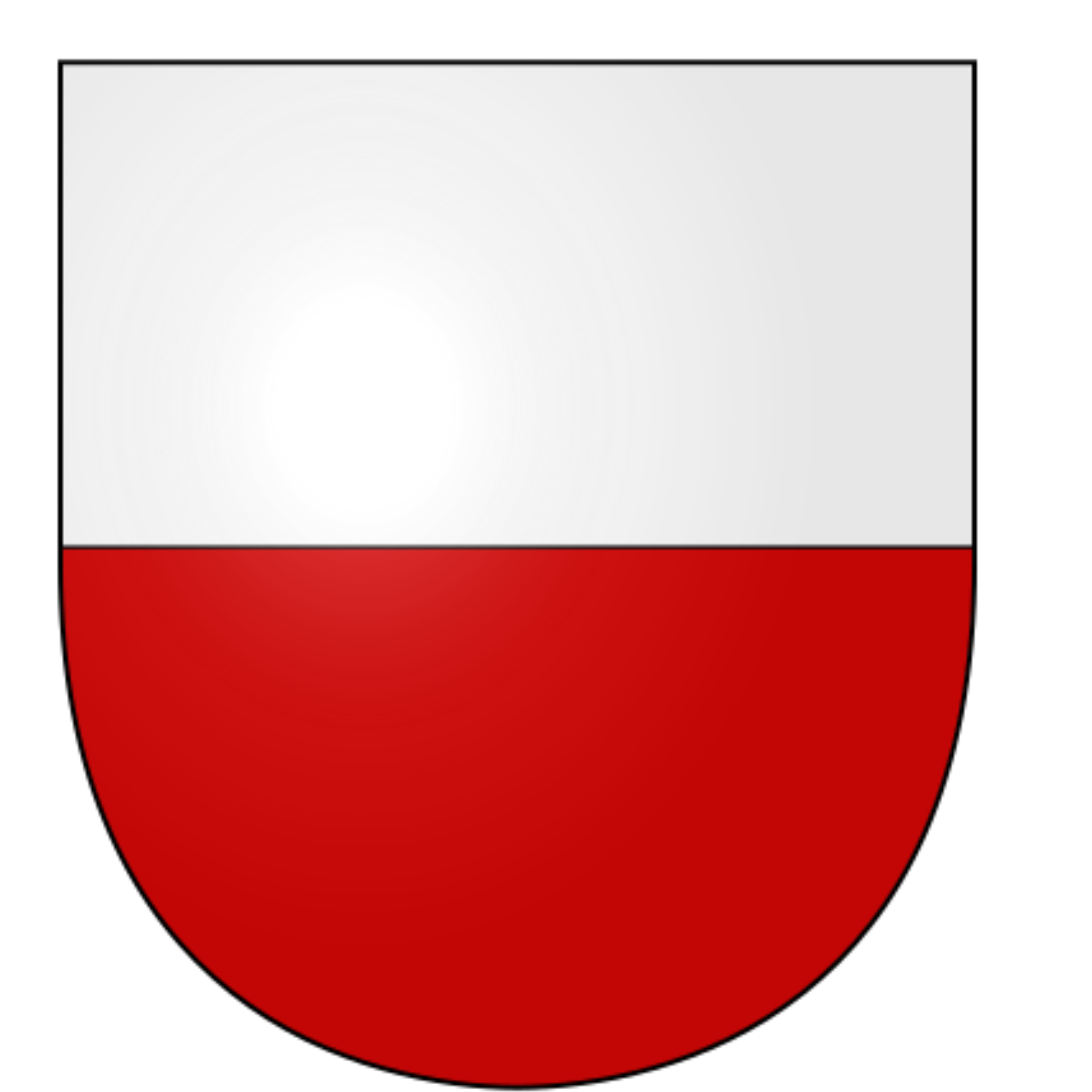
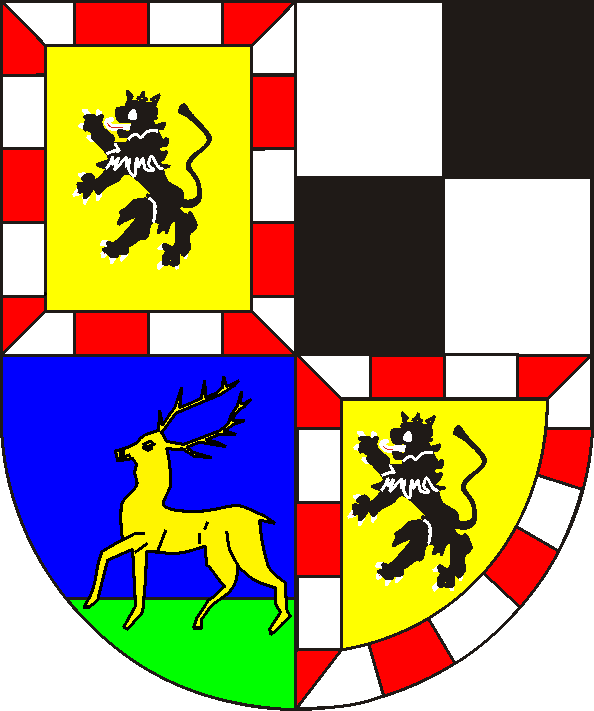
Divided in Wallachia and Moldavia (1310/46-1859), then United Principalities (1859-1866); under Ottoman vassalage (1417/98-1866)	Part of the Ascanian and Wittelsbach Margraviate of Brandenburg (1157-1356) and late Electorate of Brandenburg (1356-1440)	Part of the State of the Teutonic Order (1226-1525)
County of Hohenberg (1124-1253)
County of Zollern (1040-1218)	Burgraviate of Nuremberg (1200-1440)
County of Nagold (1253-1363)	County of Haigerloch (1st creation) (1253-1389)
County of Wildberg (1318-1397)
Sold to Württemberg
Haigerloch sold to the House of Habsburg; Recovered in 1497 from Switzerland	Raised to: County of Hohenzollern (1218-1512)
Sold to Baden
Raised to: Electorate of Brandenburg (1440-1701)
County of Haigerloch (2nd creation) (1512-1558)	County of Hechingen (1st creation) (1512-1558)	Principality of Kulmbach (1515-1557)	Principality of Ansbach (1486-1791)
Duchy of Prussia (1525-1618)
County of Hohenzollern (1558-1575)
County of Haigerloch (3rd creation) (1575-1634)	County of Sigmaringen (1575-1623)	County of Hechingen (2nd creation) (1575-1623) Raised to: Principality of Hechingen (1623-1849)
Principality of Bayreuth (1603-1769)
County of Haigerloch (4th creation) (1680-1767)	Raised to: Principality of Sigmaringen (1623-1849)
Raised to: Kingdom of Prussia (1701-1871)
March of Schwedt (1692-1788)
Principality of Romania (Ottoman vassal 1866-1877) (Sigmaringen branch) (1866-1881)
Raised to: Kingdom of Romania (Sigmaringen branch) (1881-1947)	Raised to: German Empire (1871-1918)
Weimar Republic

Table of rulers

Ruler	Born	Reign	Ruling part	Consort	Death	Notes
Burchard I	c.1020 Son of Friedrich of Sülichgau and Irmentrud of Nellenburg (disputed)	1040 – 1061	County of Zollern	Anastasia of Rheinfelden one child	1061 aged 40–41	First documented member of the family.
Frederick I Maute	c.1050 Son of Burchard I and Anastasia of Rheinfelden	1061 – 1125	County of Zollern	Udehild of Urach eight children	1125 aged 74–75	
Frederick II	c.1100 First son of Frederick I and Udehild of Urach	1125 – 1155	County of Zollern	Unknown two children	c.1155 aged 54–55	Children of Frederick I, divided their inheritance.
Burchard II	c.1096 Second son of Frederick I and Udehild of Urach	1125 – 1154	County of Hohenberg	Helmburgis of Schala-Burghausen (d.c.1155) two children	1154 aged 57–58	Children of Frederick I, divided their inheritance.
Burchard III	c.1130 Son of Burchard II and Helmburgis of Schala-Burghausen	1154 – July 1193	County of Hohenberg	Kunigunde of Grünberg two children	July 1193 aged 62–63	
Godfrey	c.1096 Third son of Frederick I and Udehild of Urach	1155 – 1160	County of Zollern	Unmarried	1160 aged 64–65	Brother of Frederick II, left no children. The county passed to his nephews.
Frederick III & I	c.1130 Son of Frederick II	1160 – 1204	County of Zollern (with Burgraviate of Nuremberg jure uxoris since 1184)	Sophie of Raabs; 1184 three children	1204 aged 73–74	
Burchard IV	c.1150 First son of Burchard III and Kunigunde of Grünberg	July 1193 – 1225	County of Hohenberg	Willipurg von Eichelberg two children	1225 aged 74–75?	Children of Burchard III, ruled jointly.
Albert I	c.1150 Second son of Burchard III and Kunigunde of Grünberg	July 1193 – 1225	County of Hohenberg	Unmarried	1225? aged 75–75?	Children of Burchard III, ruled jointly.
Conrad I the Pious	1186; First son of Frederick III & I and Sophie of Raabs	1204 – 1218	County of Zollern	Clementia four children Unknown two children	10 March 1261 aged 74–75	Children of Frederick III & I, divided their inheritance, but in 1218 exchanged it between themselves. Conrad, who received Zollern and exchanged it for Nuremberg, founded the Franconian branch, which later converted to Protestantism; Frederick received Nuremberg and exchanged it for Zollern, founded the Swabian branch, which remains Catholic.
Conrad I the Pious	1186; First son of Frederick III & I and Sophie of Raabs	1218 – 10 March 1261	Burgraviate of Nuremberg	Clementia four children Unknown two children	10 March 1261 aged 74–75	Children of Frederick III & I, divided their inheritance, but in 1218 exchanged it between themselves. Conrad, who received Zollern and exchanged it for Nuremberg, founded the Franconian branch, which later converted to Protestantism; Frederick received Nuremberg and exchanged it for Zollern, founded the Swabian branch, which remains Catholic.
Frederick IV & II the Lion	1188; Second son of Frederick III & I and Sophie of Raabs	1204 – 1218	Burgraviate of Nuremberg	Elisabeth four children	1255 aged 66-67	Children of Frederick III & I, divided their inheritance, but in 1218 exchanged it between themselves. Conrad, who received Zollern and exchanged it for Nuremberg, founded the Franconian branch, which later converted to Protestantism; Frederick received Nuremberg and exchanged it for Zollern, founded the Swabian branch, which remains Catholic.
Frederick IV & II the Lion	1188; Second son of Frederick III & I and Sophie of Raabs	1218 – 1255	County of Zollern (until 1218) County of Hohenzollern (from 1218)	Elisabeth four children	1255 aged 66-67	Children of Frederick III & I, divided their inheritance, but in 1218 exchanged it between themselves. Conrad, who received Zollern and exchanged it for Nuremberg, founded the Franconian branch, which later converted to Protestantism; Frederick received Nuremberg and exchanged it for Zollern, founded the Swabian branch, which remains Catholic.
Burchard V	c.1190 Son of Burchard IV and Willipurg von Eichelberg	1225 – 14 July 1253	County of Hohenberg	Matilda of Tübingen c.1230 five children	14 July 1253 aged 62–63	Died by a lightning strike.
Gertrude Anna	c.1225 Deilingen; Daughter of Burchard V and Matilda of Tübingen	14 July 1253 – 16 February 1281	County of Hohenberg (at Sélestat)	Rudolph I of Habsburg; 1251; Alsace eleven children	16 February 1281; Vienna aged 55–56	Children of Burchard V, divided their inheritance. Gertrude's inheritance went to her descendants (the Habsburgs). Burchard associated his son Otto to his rule.
Albert II the Troubadour	c.1235 First son of Burchard V and Matilda of Tübingen	14 July 1253 – 17 April 1298	County of Haigerloch (with Hohenberg proper)	Unknown two children Margaret of Fürstenberg; 1282 three children Ursula of Oettingen (d.1308) c.1300 two children	17 April 1298; Leinstetten Castle aged 62–63	Children of Burchard V, divided their inheritance. Gertrude's inheritance went to her descendants (the Habsburgs). Burchard associated his son Otto to his rule.
Burchard VI	c.1240 Second son of Burchard V and Matilda of Tübingen	14 July 1253 – 24 July 1318	County of Nagold	Unknown one child Luitgard of Tübingen c.1275 three children	24 July 1318 aged 77–78	Children of Burchard V, divided their inheritance. Gertrude's inheritance went to her descendants (the Habsburgs). Burchard associated his son Otto to his rule.
Otto I	c.1275 First son of Burchard VI and Luitgard of Tübingen	c.1290 – 12 July 1299	County of Nagold	Maria of Magenheim; 1290 two children	12 July 1299 aged 23–24	Children of Burchard V, divided their inheritance. Gertrude's inheritance went to her descendants (the Habsburgs). Burchard associated his son Otto to his rule.
Frederick V the Illustrious	c.1230 Son of Frederick IV & II and Elisabeth	1255 – 24 May 1289	County of Hohenzollern	Udehild of Dillingen; 1257 four children	24 May 1289 aged 58–59	
Frederick III the Heir	1220; Nuremberg; Son of Conrad I and Clementia	10 March 1261 – 14 August 1297	Burgraviate of Nuremberg	Elisabeth of Merania; 1246 five children Helene of Saxony (1247-12 June 1309); 10 April 1280 three children	14 August 1297; Cadolzburg aged 76–77	Children of Conrad I, divided their property. Frederick III inherited Bayreuth from his wife, while Conrad, in 1296, sold his property at Abensberg to the Diocese of Eichstätt.
Conrad II the Pious	1235; Nuremberg; Son of Conrad I	10 March 1261 – 1296	Burgraviate of Nuremberg (at Abenberg)	Agnes of Hohenlohe-Uffenheim c.1250 seven children Agnes of Hirschberg (d.c.1300); 1295 no children	6 July 1314 aged 78–79	Children of Conrad I, divided their property. Frederick III inherited Bayreuth from his wife, while Conrad, in 1296, sold his property at Abensberg to the Diocese of Eichstätt.
Frederick VI the Knight	1258; Son of Frederick V and Udehild of Dillingen	24 May 1289 – 4 May 1298	County of Hohenzollern	Kunigunde of Baden; December 1281 six children	4 May 1298 aged 39–40	
John I	1279; Nuremberg; First son of Frederick III and Helene of Saxony	14 August 1297 – 25 February 1300	Burgraviate of Nuremberg	Agnes of Hesse; 1297 no children	25 February 1300 aged 20–21	Died early and without descendants. He was succeeded by his brother.
Albert III Rosselmann	c.1260 Son of Albert II	17 April 1298 – November 1304	County of Haigerloch	Unknown; 1 August 1284; Grüningen no children Clara Euphemia of Gorizia; February 1296 no children	November 1304 aged 43–44	Left no children. He was succeeded by his brother.
Frederick VII the Elder	c.1285 First son of Frederick VI and Kunigunde of Baden	4 May 1298 – 6 October 1309	County of Hohenzollern	Euphemia of Hohenberg-Haigerloch (d.1333); 1298 six children	6 October 1309 aged 23–24	
Frederick IV	1287; Nuremberg; Second son of Frederick III and Helene of Saxony	25 February 1300 – 19 May 1332	Burgraviate of Nuremberg	Margaret of Gorizia-Tyrol; 2 August 1307 ten children	19 May 1332 aged 44–45	In 1331 he purchased the town of Ansbach, nucleus of the later Principality of Ansbach established in 1398.
Rudolph I	c.1285 Son of Albert II and Margaret of Fürstenberg	November 1304 – 11 January 1336	County of Haigerloch	Agnes of Werdenberg-Heiligenberg (d.1317) c.1305? five children Irmengard of Württemberg (1300-17 May 1329); April 1318 no children Elisabeth of Sponheim-Kreuznach (1310-1349); 20 June 1331; Rottenburg am Neckar no children	11 January 1336; Vienna (?) aged 50–51	Rudolph II seemingly associated his eldest son to power, but he predeceased him.
Rudolph II	c.1305 Son of Rudolph I and Agnes of Werdenberg-Heiligenberg	c.1320 – 26 February 1335	County of Haigerloch	Margaret of Nassau-Hadamar (d.30 January 1370) c.1320 three children	26 February 1335 aged 29–30?	Rudolph II seemingly associated his eldest son to power, but he predeceased him.
Regency of Frederick of Hohenzollern and/or Euphemia of Hohenberg-Haigerloch (1309–1314/5)						Usually not counted or listed, probably because he died as minor. Nonetheless, he is documented as Lord of Zollern.
Frederick Fritzli (I)	c.1300 Son of Frederick VII and Euphemia of Hohenberg-Haigerloch	6 October 1309 – 1315	County of Hohenzollern	Unmarried	c.1315 aged 14–15?	Usually not counted or listed, probably because he died as minor. Nonetheless, he is documented as Lord of Zollern.
Frederick VIII the Easter Sunday	c.1285 Second son of Frederick VI and Kunigunde of Baden	1315 – 1 February 1333	County of Hohenzollern	Unknown four children	1 February 1333 aged 39–40	
Burchard VII	c.1280 Second son of Burchard VI and Luitgard of Tübingen	24 July 1318 – 2 September 1355	County of Wildberg	Agnes c.1300? seven children	2 September 1355 aged 74–75?	Heirs of Burchard VI (son and grandson), divided the inheritance.
Burchard VIII	c.1290 Son of Otto I and Maria of Magenheim	24 July 1318 – 1342	County of Nagold	Agnes of Vaihingen; 1316 five children	1342 aged 51–52	Heirs of Burchard VI (son and grandson), divided the inheritance.
John II the Acquirer	1309; First son of Frederick IV and Margaret of Gorizia-Tyrol	19 May 1332 – 7 October 1357	Burgraviate of Nuremberg (at Nuremberg proper)	Elisabeth of Henneberg-Schleusingen; 1333 five children	7 October 1357 aged 44–45	Children of Frederick IV, John and Conrad ruled jointly, until the death of the latter, one year later. By an agreement in 1341, John divided the Burgraviate with his brother Albert. John's cognomen derives from the purchase, in 1340, of the castle Plassenburg in Kulmbach, with its respective county by the contract of inheritance with the counts of Orlamünde.
Conrad III	1309; Second son of Frederick IV and Margaret of Gorizia-Tyrol	19 May 1332 – 3 April 1334	Burgraviate of Nuremberg (at Nuremberg proper)	Irmgard of Hohenlohe-Weikersheim; 1332 no children	31 July 1357 aged 44–45	Children of Frederick IV, John and Conrad ruled jointly, until the death of the latter, one year later. By an agreement in 1341, John divided the Burgraviate with his brother Albert. John's cognomen derives from the purchase, in 1340, of the castle Plassenburg in Kulmbach, with its respective county by the contract of inheritance with the counts of Orlamünde.
Albert the Beautiful	1319; Third son of Frederick IV and Margaret of Gorizia-Tyrol	10 October 1341 – 4 April 1361	Burgraviate of Nuremberg (at Hildburghausen, Heldburg, Eisfeld, Ermershausen and Ummerstadt)	Sophia of Henneberg-Schleusingen c.1330? two children	4 April 1361 aged 44–45	Children of Frederick IV, John and Conrad ruled jointly, until the death of the latter, one year later. By an agreement in 1341, John divided the Burgraviate with his brother Albert. John's cognomen derives from the purchase, in 1340, of the castle Plassenburg in Kulmbach, with its respective county by the contract of inheritance with the counts of Orlamünde.
Frederick Fritzli (II)	c.1300 First son of Frederick VIII	1 February 1333 – 16 March 1339	County of Hohenzollern	Unmarried	16 March 1339 aged 38–39	Usually not counted or listed. Nonetheless, he is documented as Lord of Zollern.
Rudolph III	c.1320 Son of Rudolph II and Margaret of Nassau-Hadamar	11 January 1336 – November 1389	County of Haigerloch (only at Rottenburg am Neckar since 1381)	Ida of Toggenburg (d.26 January 1399); May 1360 one child	November 1389 aged 50–51	In 1381, he sold Haigerloch to the Habsburgs. He remained in his seat at Rottenburg am Neckar.
Haigerloch (with exceptions) was sold to Austria
Frederick IX the Black	c.1300 Second son of Frederick VIII	16 March 1339 – 1 March 1379	County of Hohenzollern (half 1)	Adelaide of Hohenberg-Wildenberg; April 1341 five children	1 March 1379 aged 78–79?	Younger children of Frederick VIII, divided their inheritance, because Frederick (X), formerly a canon of Strasbourg, returned to secular life.
Frederick (X) of Strasbourg	c.1300 Third son of Frederick VIII	16 March 1339 – March 1365	County of Hohenzollern (half 2)	Margaret of Hohenberg-Wildenberg; 1343 five children	March 1365 aged 64–65?	Younger children of Frederick VIII, divided their inheritance, because Frederick (X), formerly a canon of Strasbourg, returned to secular life.
Otto II	c.1320 Son of Burchard VIII and Agnes of Vaihingen	1342 – 23 June 1363	County of Nagold	Kunigunde of Wertheim (d.1358); 27 February 1349 four children Irmgard of Werdenberg (d.24 October 1379); 13 July 1371 no children	6 July 1385 aged 64–655	In 1363 sold Nagold to the Counts of Württemberg. His descendants continued to claim, however, its possession.
Nagold sold to Württemberg
Burchard IX	c.1310 First son of Burchard VII and Agnes	2 September 1355 – 14 August 1363	County of Wildberg (in Wildberg half 1)	Anna of Brauneck c.1330? two children	10 August 1381 aged 70–71?	Divided their inheritance. In 1363, Burchard sold his half of Wildberg plus the town of Bulach to the Electoral Palatinate.
Conrad I	c.1310 Second son of Burchard VII and Agnes	2 September 1355 – 6 September 1356	County of Wildberg (in Altensteig and Wildberg half 2)	Margareta van Hewen (d.December 1398) c.1330? two children	6 September 1356 aged 45–46?	Divided their inheritance. In 1363, Burchard sold his half of Wildberg plus the town of Bulach to the Electoral Palatinate.
Rudolph IV	c.1330 Son of Conrad I and Margareta van Hewen	6 September 1356 – 28 December 1397	County of Wildberg (only in Altensteig since 1363)	Unknown one child	28 December 1397 aged 66–67	Sold his half of Wildenberg to the Palatinate at the same time of his uncle Burchard. Didn't leave surviving descendants. Altensteig became part of the Margraviate of Baden.
Wildberg sold to the Palatinate; Altensteig annexed to Baden
Frederick V	1333; Son of John II and Elisabeth of Henneberg-Schleusingen	31 July 1357 – 21 January 1398	Burgraviate of Nuremberg (at Nuremberg proper)	Margaret of Gorizia-Tyrol; 2 August 1307 ten children	21 January 1398 aged 44–45	
Regency of Sophia of Henneberg-Schleusingen (1361-1372)						Through her marriage, her inheritance went to the House of Wettin.
Margaret	1359; Daughter of Albert and Sophia of Henneberg-Schleusingen	4 April 1361 – 1391	Burgraviate of Nuremberg (at Hildburghausen, Heldburg, Eisfeld, Ermershausen and Ummerstadt)	Balthasar, Landgrave of Thuringia; 22 July 1374 two children	1391 aged 31–32	Through her marriage, her inheritance went to the House of Wettin.
Frederick XI the Elder	c.1345 Son of Frederick (X) and Margaret of Hohenberg-Wildenberg	March 1365 – 26 November 1401	County of Hohenzollern (half 2)	Adelaide of Fürstenberg; January 1377 six children	26 November 1401 aged 55–56?	
Frederick X the Black	1342? Son of Frederick IX and Adelaide of Hohenberg-Wildenberg	1 March 1379 – 21 June 1412	County of Hohenzollern (half 1)	Anna of Hohenberg-Nagold (d.1421) c.1350? no children	21 June 1412 aged 69–70?	His death with no descendants led to the reunion of the Hohenzollern patrimony.
Margaret	c.1360 Daughter of Rudolph III and Ida of Toggenburg	November 1389 – 26 February 1419	County of Haigerloch (at Rottenburg am Neckar)	Bernard I, Margrave of Baden; 1 September 1384 (annulled 1391) no children Herman VI, Count of Sulz-Klettgau; April 1391 three children	26 February 1419 aged 58–59	Through her marriage, Rothenburg was inherited by the Counts of Sulz.
Rottenburg was inherited by the County of Sulz
John III	1369; First son of Frederick V and Elisabeth of Meissen	21 January 1398 – 11 June 1420	Burgraviate of Nuremberg (at Kulmbach)	Margaret of Bohemia; 1381 one child	11 June 1420; Plassenburg aged 51–52	Divided their inheritance. Originally Burgrave of Nuremberg as Frederick VI, Frederick was appointed by King Sigismund in 1415 and enfeoffed in 1417. In 1420, with Jon's death with no descendants, he joined his ancestors' Nurembergian lands with Brandenburg. In 1427, he sold Nuremberg to the Free Imperial City of Nuremberg.
Frederick VI & I	21 September 1371; Free Imperial City of Nuremberg; Second son of Frederick V and Elisabeth of Meissen	21 January 1398 – 20 September 1440	Burgraviate of Nuremberg (at Ansbach; in all Burgraviate since 1420) Electorate of Brandenburg (from 1415; with Burgraviate of Nuremberg until 1427)	Elisabeth of Bavaria-Landshut; 18 September 1401 ten children	20 September 1440; Cadolzburg aged 68	Divided their inheritance. Originally Burgrave of Nuremberg as Frederick VI, Frederick was appointed by King Sigismund in 1415 and enfeoffed in 1417. In 1420, with Jon's death with no descendants, he joined his ancestors' Nurembergian lands with Brandenburg. In 1427, he sold Nuremberg to the Free Imperial City of Nuremberg.
Frederick XII of Oettingen	c.1390 First son of Frederick XI and Adelaide of Fürstenberg	26 November 1401 – 1428 30 September 1439 – 30 September 1443	County of Hohenzollern (in half 2 until 1412; in all Hohenzollern since 1412)	Anna of Sulz (d.1440) c.1405? no children	30 September 1443; Palestine aged 52–53	Children of Frederick XI, ruled jointly. In 1412, they reunited the Hohenzollen patrimony. Between 1429 and 1439, Frederick XII was kept under Henriette, Countess of Montbéliard's custody.
Eitel Frederick I	c.1390 Second son of Frederick XI and Adelaide of Fürstenberg	26 November 1401 – 30 September 1439	County of Hohenzollern (in half 2 until 1412; in all Hohenzollern since 1412)	Ursula of Rhäzüns (d.17 February 1477); 1432 four children	30 September 1439; Hechingen aged 48–49	Children of Frederick XI, ruled jointly. In 1412, they reunited the Hohenzollen patrimony. Between 1429 and 1439, Frederick XII was kept under Henriette, Countess of Montbéliard's custody.
John the Alchemist	1406; First son of Frederick VI & I and Elisabeth of Bavaria-Landshut	20 September 1440 – 1457	Principality of Kulmbach	Barbara of Saxe-Wittenberg; 1416 four children	16 November 1464; Baiersdorf aged 57–58	Divided their inheritance. John abdicated in 1457. The second son, Frederick, inherited the electorate, but he didn't have male successors; the inheritance went to their younger brother.
Frederick II Irontooth	19 November 1413; Tangermünde; Second son of Frederick VI & I and Elisabeth of Bavaria-Landshut	20 September 1440 – 10 February 1471	Electorate of Brandenburg	Catherine of Saxony; 11 June 1441; Wittenberg three children	10 February 1471; Neustadt an der Aisch aged 57	Divided their inheritance. John abdicated in 1457. The second son, Frederick, inherited the electorate, but he didn't have male successors; the inheritance went to their younger brother.
Albert I Achilles	9 November 1414; Tangermünde; Third son of Frederick VI & I and Elisabeth of Bavaria-Landshut	20 September 1440 – 11 March 1486	Principality of Ansbach (with Kulmbach since 1457)	Margaret of Baden; 1446 four children Anna of Saxony; 12 November 1458; Ansbach thirteen children	11 March 1486; Imperial City of Frankfurt aged 71	Divided their inheritance. John abdicated in 1457. The second son, Frederick, inherited the electorate, but he didn't have male successors; the inheritance went to their younger brother.
Albert I Achilles	9 November 1414; Tangermünde; Third son of Frederick VI & I and Elisabeth of Bavaria-Landshut	10 February 1471 – 11 March 1486	Electorate of Brandenburg	Margaret of Baden; 1446 four children Anna of Saxony; 12 November 1458; Ansbach thirteen children	11 March 1486; Imperial City of Frankfurt aged 71	Divided their inheritance. John abdicated in 1457. The second son, Frederick, inherited the electorate, but he didn't have male successors; the inheritance went to their younger brother.
Jobst Nicholas I	1433; Son of Eitel Frederick I and Ursula of Rhäzüns	30 September 1443 – 9 February 1488	County of Hohenzollern	Agnes of Werdenberg-Trochtelfingen; 1448 six children	9 February 1488; Zollernalbkreis aged 54–55	Under a succession treaty of 1429 with the House of Württemberg, the county would fall to the Counts of Württemberg if the Swabian branch of the House of Hohenzollern were to die out in the male line. With Jobst Nicholas's birth, this risk was averted.
John Cicero	2 August 1455; Ansbach; Son of Albert I Achilles and Margaret of Baden	11 March 1486 – 9 January 1499	Electorate of Brandenburg	Margaret of Thuringia; 15 August 1476; Berlin six children	9 January 1499; Arneburg aged 43	Children of Albert Achilles, divided their inheritance. Once more, as occurred in the previous generation, Kulmbach was annexed to Ansbach. In 1515, after depleting the finances of the march with his lavish lifestyle, Frederick I was deposed by his two sons.
Frederick I the Elder	8 May 1460; Ansbach; First son of Albert I Achilles and Anna of Saxony	11 March 1486 – 1515	Principality of Ansbach (with Kulmbach since 1495)	Sophia of Poland; 14 February 1479; Frankfurt (Oder) seventeen children	4 April 1536; Ansbach aged 75	Children of Albert Achilles, divided their inheritance. Once more, as occurred in the previous generation, Kulmbach was annexed to Ansbach. In 1515, after depleting the finances of the march with his lavish lifestyle, Frederick I was deposed by his two sons.
Sigismund	27 September 1468; Ansbach; Second son of Albert I Achilles and Anna of Saxony	11 March 1486 – 26 February 1495	Principality of Kulmbach	Unmarried	26 February 1495; Ansbach aged 26	Children of Albert Achilles, divided their inheritance. Once more, as occurred in the previous generation, Kulmbach was annexed to Ansbach. In 1515, after depleting the finances of the march with his lavish lifestyle, Frederick I was deposed by his two sons.
Eitel Frederick II	1452; Son of Jobst Nicholas I and Agnes of Werdenberg-Trochtelfingen	9 February 1488 – 18 June 1512	County of Hohenzollern	Magdalena of Brandenburg; 1482; Berlin six children	18 June 1512; Trier aged 59–60	
Joachim I Nestor	21 February 1484; Cölln; Son of John Cicero and Margaret of Thuringia	9 January 1499 – 11 July 1535	Electorate of Brandenburg	Elizabeth of Denmark; 10 April 1502; Berlin five children	11 July 1535; Stendal aged 51	
Francis Wolfgang	1483; First son of Eitel Frederick II and Magdalena of Brandenburg	18 June 1512 – 16 June 1517	County of Haigerloch	Rosine of Baden; 1503 six children	16 June 1517; Hechingen aged 33–34	Children of Eitel Frederick II, divided their inheritance.
Eitel Frederick III	1494; Second son of Eitel Frederick II and Magdalena of Brandenburg	18 June 1512 – 15 June 1525	County of Hechingen	Johanna van Witthem (d.1544); 1515 six children	15 June 1525; Pavia aged 30–31	Children of Eitel Frederick II, divided their inheritance.
Casimir	27 December 1481; Ansbach; First son of Frederick I and Sophia of Poland	1515 – 21 September 1527	Principality of Kulmbach	Susanna of Bavaria; 25 August 1518; Augsburg five children	21 September 1527; Buda aged 45	Children of Frederick I, deprived their father of his possessions and divided the inheritance.
George I the Pious	4 March 1484; Ansbach; Second son of Frederick I and Sophia of Poland	1515 – 27 December 1543	Principality of Ansbach	Beatrice de Frangepan; 21 January 1509; Gyula no children Hedwig of Münsterberg-Oels; 9 January 1525; Oleśnica two children Emilie of Saxony; 25 August 1533 four children	27 December 1543; Ansbach aged 59	Children of Frederick I, deprived their father of his possessions and divided the inheritance.
Rosine of Baden	5 March 1487; Daughter of Christopher I, Margrave of Baden and Ottilie of Katzenelnbogen	16 June 1517 – 17 December 1526	County of Haigerloch (at Haigerloch Castle)	Francis Wolfgang; 1503 six children Johann von Ow, Baron of Wachendorf (d.29 October 1571); 17 December 1526 no children	29 October 1554; Wachendorf (Starzach) aged 67	Heirs of Francis Wolfgang. Christopher inherited the county still as a minor, and his mother, who also held the main castle of Haigerloch as widow's seat, also served as his regent. Left no male descendants: Haigerloch was inherited by his uncle Joachim.
Regency of Rosine of Baden (1517-1524)						Heirs of Francis Wolfgang. Christopher inherited the county still as a minor, and his mother, who also held the main castle of Haigerloch as widow's seat, also served as his regent. Left no male descendants: Haigerloch was inherited by his uncle Joachim.
Christopher Frederick	1510; Son of Francis Wolfgang and Rosine of Baden	16 June 1517 – 1536	County of Haigerloch	Anna Rehlinger von Haltenberg; 1530 one child	1536; Marseille aged 25–26	Heirs of Francis Wolfgang. Christopher inherited the county still as a minor, and his mother, who also held the main castle of Haigerloch as widow's seat, also served as his regent. Left no male descendants: Haigerloch was inherited by his uncle Joachim.
Albert	17 May 1490; Ansbach; Third son of Frederick I and Sophia of Poland	10 April 1525 – 20 March 1568	Duchy of Prussia (previously State of the Teutonic Order)	Dorothea of Denmark; 1 July 1526; Königsberg six children Anna Maria of Brunswick-Calenberg; 16 February 1550; Königsberg two children	20 March 1568; Gvardeysk aged 77	Son of Frederick I of Ansbach, and previously Grand Master of the Teutonic Knights, in 1525 he converted to Protestantism, and reformed his territory to be laic, becoming the first Duke of Prussia.
Regency of George, Margrave of Brandenburg-Ansbach (1527–1541)						Left no descendants, and Kulmbach returned to Ansbach.
Albert II Alcibiades the Warlike	28 March 1522; Ansbach; Son of Casimir and Susanna of Bavaria	21 September 1527 – 8 January 1557	Principality of Kulmbach	Unmarried	8 January 1557; Pforzheim aged 34	Left no descendants, and Kulmbach returned to Ansbach.
Joachim II Hector	13 January 1505; Cölln; First son of Joachim I Nestor and Elizabeth of Denmark	11 July 1535 – 3 January 1571	Electorate of Brandenburg	Magdalena of Saxony; 6 November 1524; Dresden six children Hedwig of Poland; 29 August/1 September 1535; Kraków six children	3 January 1571; Köpenick Palace aged 65	Children of Joachim I, divided their inheritance. John was the first and only Margrave at Küstrin, and after his death it was annexed again to the Electorate. Joachim II was the first Protestant Elector of Brandenburg.
John the Wise	3 August 1513; Second son of Joachim I Nestor and Elizabeth of Denmark	11 July 1535 – 13 January 1571	March of Küstrin	Catherine of Brunswick-Wolfenbüttel; 11 November 1537; Wolfenbüttel two children	13 January 1571; Küstrin aged 57	Children of Joachim I, divided their inheritance. John was the first and only Margrave at Küstrin, and after his death it was annexed again to the Electorate. Joachim II was the first Protestant Elector of Brandenburg.
Joachim	1485; Third son of Eitel Frederick II and Magdalena of Brandenburg	1536 – 2 February 1538	County of Haigerloch	Anastasia von Stoffeln (1490 - 16 November 1530); 1513 one child	2 February 1538; Hechingen aged 52–53	
Jobst Nicholas II	1514; Son of Joachim and Anastasia von Stoffeln	2 February 1538 – 10 June 1558	County of Haigerloch	Anna of Zimmern-Wildenstein (29 June 1513 - 28 May 1570); 1531; Meßkirch no children	10 June 1558; Hechingen aged 43–44	Left no children. After his death Haigerloch returned to Hechingen.
Regencies of Joachim II Hector, Elector of Brandenburg and Philip I, Landgrave of Hesse (1543–1548), John Frederick I, Elector of Saxony (1543–1547) and Maurice, Elector of Saxony (1547–1548)						In 1557, reunited Kulmbach to Ansbach once more. Left no descendants, and the Marches passed to the sons of Elector John George.
George Frederick I the Elder	5 April 1539; Ansbach; Son of George I and Emilie of Saxony	27 December 1543 – 25 April 1603	Principality of Ansbach (with Kulmbach since 1557)	Elisabeth of Brandenburg-Küstrin; 26 December 1558; Küstrin no children Sophie of Brunswick-Lüneburg; 3 May 1579; Dresden no children	25 April 1603; Ansbach aged 64	In 1557, reunited Kulmbach to Ansbach once more. Left no descendants, and the Marches passed to the sons of Elector John George.
Charles I	1516; Brussels; Son of Eitel Frederick III and Johanna van Witthem	15 June 1525 – 10 June 1558	County of Hechingen	Anna of Baden-Durlach; 11 February 1537; Pforzheim eleven children	18 March 1576; Sigmaringen Castle aged 59–60	In 1558, reunited once again the county of Zollern.
Charles I	1516; Brussels; Son of Eitel Frederick III and Johanna van Witthem	10 June 1558 – 18 March 1576	County of Hohenzollern	Anna of Baden-Durlach; 11 February 1537; Pforzheim eleven children	18 March 1576; Sigmaringen Castle aged 59–60	In 1558, reunited once again the county of Zollern.
Council of Regency (1568-1571)						In 1572 he began to exhibit signs of mental disorder. He had twice tried to commit suicide and was prone to violent outbursts and held a great fear of " Turks and Muscovites " overrunning Germany. In 1578 he began being overruled by regents.
Albert Frederick	7 May 1553; Königsberg; Son of Albert and Anna Maria of Brunswick-Calenberg	20 March 1568 – 27 August 1618	Duchy of Prussia	Marie Eleonore of Cleves; 14 October 1573; Königsberg seven children	27 August 1618; Primorsk aged 65	In 1572 he began to exhibit signs of mental disorder. He had twice tried to commit suicide and was prone to violent outbursts and held a great fear of " Turks and Muscovites " overrunning Germany. In 1578 he began being overruled by regents.
Regency of George Frederick, Margrave of Brandenburg-Ansbach (1578-1603); Regency of Joachim Frederick, Elector of Brandenburg (1603-1608); Regency of John Sigismund, Elector of Brandenburg (1608-1618)						In 1572 he began to exhibit signs of mental disorder. He had twice tried to commit suicide and was prone to violent outbursts and held a great fear of " Turks and Muscovites " overrunning Germany. In 1578 he began being overruled by regents.
John George	11 September 1525; Cölln; Son of Joachim II Hector and Magdalena of Saxony	3 January 1571 – 8 January 1598	Electorate of Brandenburg	Sophie of Legnica; 15 February 1545 one child Sabina of Brandenburg-Ansbach; 12 February 1548; Ansbach eleven children Elisabeth of Anhalt-Zerbst; 6 October 1577; Letzlingen eleven children	8 January 1598; Cölln aged 72	
Eitel Frederick IV	7 September 1545; Sigmaringen; First son of Charles I and Anna of Baden-Durlach	18 March 1576 – 16 January 1605	County of Hechingen	Veronica of Ortenburg (d.23 March 1573); 22 May 1568; Sigmaringen no children Sibylla of Zimmern; 14 November 1574; Meßkirch four children Johanna of Eberstein (d.1633); 1 March 1601 no children	16 January 1605; Hechingen aged 59	Children of Charles I, divided their inheritance.
Charles II	22 January 1547; Sigmaringen; Second son of Charles I and Anna of Baden-Durlach	18 March 1576 – 8 April 1606	County of Sigmaringen	Euphrosyne of Oettingen-Wallerstein (1552 – 5 October 1590); 18 January 1569; Munich fifteen children Elisabeth of Pallandt-Kulemborg (1567–1620); 13 October 1591; Sigmaringen ten children	8 April 1606; Sigmaringen aged 59	Children of Charles I, divided their inheritance.
Christopher	10 March 1552; Haigerloch; Third son of Charles I and Anna of Baden-Durlach	18 March 1576 – 21 April 1592	County of Haigerloch	Catherine von Welsperg and Primör (d.1610); 1577; Sigmaringen six children	21 April 1592; Haigerloch aged 40	Children of Charles I, divided their inheritance.
Regency of Eitel Frederick IV, Count of Hechingen and Charles II, Count of Sigmaringen (1592-1604)						Left no descendants. He was succeeded by his brother.
John Christopher	1586; Haigerloch; First son of Christopher and Catherine von Welsperg and Primör	21 April 1592 – 4 December 1620	County of Haigerloch	Elisabeth of Hohenzollern-Sigmaringen; 21 September 1608; Sigmaringen no children	4 December 1620; Haigerloch aged 33–34	Left no descendants. He was succeeded by his brother.
Joachim Frederick	27 January 1546; Cölln; Son of John George and Sophie of Legnica	8 January 1598 – 18 July 1608	Electorate of Brandenburg	Catherine of Brandenburg-Küstrin; 8 January 1570; Küstrin eleven children Eleanor of Prussia; 2 November 1603; Berlin one child	18 July 1608; Köpenick aged 62	Divided the inheritance, mainly after George Frederick I of Ansbach's death with no children. In 1604 moved the capital of the March to Bayreuth.
Christian	30 January 1581; Cölln; First son of John George and Elisabeth of Anhalt-Zerbst	25 April 1603 – 30 May 1655	Principality of Bayreuth	Maria of Prussia; 29 April 1604; Kulmbach nine children	30 May 1655; Bayreuth aged 74	Divided the inheritance, mainly after George Frederick I of Ansbach's death with no children. In 1604 moved the capital of the March to Bayreuth.
Joachim Ernest	22 June 1583; Cölln; Second son of John George and Elisabeth of Anhalt-Zerbst	25 April 1603 – 7 March 1625	Principality of Ansbach	Sophie of Solms-Laubach; 1612; Ansbach three children	7 March 1625; Ansbach aged 41	Divided the inheritance, mainly after George Frederick I of Ansbach's death with no children. In 1604 moved the capital of the March to Bayreuth.
John George	1577; Sigmaringen; Son of Eitel Frederick IV and Sibylla of Zimmern	16 January 1605 – 28 September 1623	County of Hechingen (until 1623) Principality of Hechingen (from 1623)	Franziska of Salm-Neuviller; 11 October 1598; Hechingen fourteen children	28 September 1623; Hechingen aged 45–46	
John	17 August 1578; Sigmaringen; Son of Charles II and Euphrosyne of Oettingen-Wallerstein	8 April 1606 – 22 March 1638	County of Sigmaringen (until 1623) Principality of Sigmaringen (from 1623)	Johanna of Hohenzollern-Hechingen; 30 June 1602; Sigmaringen three children	22 March 1638; Munich aged 59	
John Sigismund	8 November 1572; Halle; First son of Joachim Frederick and Catherine of Brandenburg-Küstrin	18 July 1608 – 3 November 1619	Electorate of Brandenburg (with Duchy of Prussia jure uxoris since 1618)	Anna, Duchess of Prussia; 30 October 1594; Königsberg eight children	23 December 1619; Berlin aged 47	Divided their inheritance. In 1618, John Sigismund, with his wife, inherited his father-in-law's Duchy of Prussia. John George left no surviving descendants ad his duchy returned to Brandenburg. In 1622, Ferdinand III, Holy Roman Emperor confiscated Krnov from Brandenburg.
John George	16 December 1577; Wolmirstedt; Second son of Joachim Frederick and Catherine of Brandenburg-Küstrin	18 July 1608 – 1622	Duchy of Krnov	Eva Christina of Württemberg; 13 June 1610; Krnov five children	22 March 1624; Levoča aged 46	Divided their inheritance. In 1618, John Sigismund, with his wife, inherited his father-in-law's Duchy of Prussia. John George left no surviving descendants ad his duchy returned to Brandenburg. In 1622, Ferdinand III, Holy Roman Emperor confiscated Krnov from Brandenburg.
Anna	3 July 1576; Königsberg; Daughter of Albert Frederick and Marie Eleonore of Cleves	27 August 1618 – 30 August 1625	Duchy of Prussia (suo jure heiress)	John Sigismund, Elector of Brandenburg; 30 October 1594; Königsberg eight children	30 August 1625; Berlin aged 49	Heiress of her father, she was described as intellectually superior to her spouse, temperamental and strong-willed. Her marriage made possible the unification of the Brandenburg and Prussian branches.
George William	13 November 1595; Berlin; Son of John Sigismund and Anna	3 November 1619 – 1 December 1640	Electorate of Brandenburg (with Duchy of Prussia, in jure matris until 1625, suo jure since 1625)	Elizabeth Charlotte of the Palatinate; 24 July 1616; Heidelberg four children	1 December 1640; Königsberg aged 49	Also Duke of Prussia by right of his mother. His reign was marked by ineffective governance during the Thirty Years' War.
Charles	1588; Haigerloch; Second son of Christopher and Catherine von Welsperg and Primör	4 December 1620 – 9 March 1634	County of Haigerloch	Rosamund of Ortenburg (d.1636); 25 March 1618 no children	9 March 1634; Überlingen aged 45–46	Like his brother, he left no descendants. Haigerloch merged in Sigmaringen.
Haigerloch briefly merged in Sigmaringen
Eitel Frederick V	January 1601; Sigmaringen; Second son of John George and Franziska of Salm-Neuviller	28 September 1623 – 11 July 1661	Principality of Hechingen	Maria Elisabeth of Berg-s'Herenberg (January 1613 - 29 November 1671); 19 March 1630; Boutersem two children	11 July 1661; Issenheim aged 60	
Regency of Sophie of Solms-Laubach (1625-1634)						Left no descendants. He was succeeded by his brother.
Frederick III	1 May 1616; Ansbach; First son of Joachim Ernest and Sophie of Solms-Laubach	7 March 1625 – 6 September 1634	Principality of Ansbach	Unmarried	6 September 1634 near Nördlingen aged 18	Left no descendants. He was succeeded by his brother.
Regency of Sophie of Solms-Laubach (1634-1639)						
Albert II	18 September 1620; Ansbach; Second son of Joachim Ernest and Sophie of Solms-Laubach	6 September 1634 – 22 October 1667	Principality of Ansbach	Henriette Louise of Württemberg-Montbéliard; 31 August 1642; Stuttgart three children Sophie Margarete of Oettingen-Oettingen; 15 October 1651; Oettingen five children Christine of Baden-Durlach; 6 August 1665; Durlach no children	22 October 1667; Ansbach aged 47	
Meinrad I	1605; Munich; Son of John and Johanna of Hohenzollern-Hechingen	2 March 1638 – 30 January 1681	Principality of Sigmaringen	Anna Maria von Thöring-Seefeld (1613 – 12 February 1682); 7 May 1635; Braunau am Inn nineteen children	30 January 1681; Sigmaringen aged 75–76	
Frederick William I the Great	16 February 1620; Berlin Palace; Son of George William and Elizabeth Charlotte of the Palatinate	1 December 1640 – 29 April 1688	Electorate of Brandenburg	Louise Henriette of Orange-Nassau; 7 December 1646; The Hague six children Sophia Dorothea of Sonderburg-Glücksburg; 13 July 1668; Gröningen seven children	29 April 1688; City Palace, Potsdam aged 68	Also Duke of Prussia.
Christian Ernest	6 August 1644; Bayreuth; Son of Erdmann August of Brandenburg-Bayreuth and Sophie of Brandenburg-Ansbach	30 May 1655 – 20 May 1712	Principality of Bayreuth	Erdmuthe Sophie of Saxony; 29 October 1662; Dresden no children Sophie Luise of Württemberg; 8 February 1671; Stuttgart six children Elisabeth Sophie of Brandenburg; 30 March 1703; Potsdam nine children	20 May 1712; Erlangen aged 67	Grandson of Christian I.
Philip	24 June 1616; Hechingen; Sixth son of John George and Franziska of Salm-Neuviller	11 July 1661 – 24 January 1671	Principality of Hechingen	Maria Sidonia of Baden-Rodemachern; 12 November 1662; Baden-Baden eight children	24 January 1671; Hechingen aged 54	Heirs of Eitel Frederick V. The lordship of Bergen op Zoom was inherited by Franziska's descendants.
Franziska Henriette	1642; Daughter of Eitel Frederick V and Maria Elisabeth of Berg-s'Herenberg	11 July 1661 – 17 October 1698	Principality of Hechingen (at Bergen op Zoom; jure matris until 1671; suo jure from 1671)	Frederick Maurice de la Tour d'Auvergne, Count of Auvergne; May 1662 eight children	17 October 1698; Bergen op Zoom aged 55–56	Heirs of Eitel Frederick V. The lordship of Bergen op Zoom was inherited by Franziska's descendants.
John Frederick	18 October 1654; Ansbach; Son of Albert II and Sophie Margarete of Oettingen-Oettingen	22 October 1667 – 22 March 1686	Principality of Ansbach	Johanna Elisabeth of Baden-Durlach; 26 January 1673; Durlach five children Eleonore Erdmuthe of Saxe-Eisenach; 4 November 1681; Eisenach three children	22 March 1686; Ansbach aged 31	
Regency of Maria Sidonia of Baden-Rodemachern (1671-1681)						
Frederick William	20 September 1663; Hechingen; Son of Philip and Maria Sidonia of Baden-Rodemachern	24 January 1671 – 14 November 1735	Principality of Hechingen	Maria Leopoldine von Sinzendorf (1 April 1666 - 18 May 1709); 22 January 1687; Vienna six children Maximiliane Magdalena von Lützau (11 July 1690 - 8 September 1755); 7 September 1710; Hechingen two children	14 November 1735; Hechingen aged 72	
Maximilian I	20 January 1636; Munich; First son of Meinrad I and Anna Maria von Thöring-Seefeld	30 January 1681 – 13 August 1689	Principality of Sigmaringen	Maria Clara of Berg-'s-Heerenberg (27 April 1635 - 15 July 1715); 12 January 1666; Boxmeer twelve children	13 August 1689; Sigmaringen aged 53	Children of Meinrad I, divided their inheritance.
Francis Anton	2 December 1657; Sigmaringen Castle; Eleventh son of Meinrad I and Anna Maria von Thöring-Seefeld	30 January 1681 – 14 October 1702	County of Haigerloch	Anna Maria Eusebia of Königsegg-Aulendorf (1670-1716); 5 February 1687 four children	14 October 1702; Friedlingen aged 44	Children of Meinrad I, divided their inheritance.
Council of Regency (1686–1692)						Died as a minor; he was succeeded by his brother.
Christian Albert	18 September 1675; First son of John Frederick and Johanna Elisabeth of Baden-Durlach	22 March 1686 – 16 October 1692	Principality of Ansbach	Unmarried	16 October 1692; Ansbach aged 17	Died as a minor; he was succeeded by his brother.
Frederick III & I the Mercenary	11 July 1657; Königsberg; Son of Frederick William I and Louise Henriette of Orange-Nassau	29 April 1688 – 25 February 1713	Electorate of Brandenburg (until 1701) Kingdom of Prussia (with Electorate of Brandenburg; from 1701)	Elisabeth Henriette of Hesse-Kassel; 13 August 1679; Potsdam one child Sophia Charlotte of Hanover; 8 October 1684; Herrenhausen two children Sophia Louise of Mecklenburg-Schwerin; 28 November 1708; Berlin no children	25 February 1713; Berlin aged 55	Children of Frederick William, divided their inheritance. In 1701, Frederick became the first King in Prussia, as Frederick I.
Philip William	19 May 1669; Königsberg; Son of Frederick William I and Sophia Dorothea of Sonderburg-Glücksburg	29 April 1688 – 19 December 1711	March of Schwedt	Johanna Charlotte of Anhalt-Dessau; 25 January 1699; Oranienbaum six children	19 December 1711; Schwedt aged 42	Children of Frederick William, divided their inheritance. In 1701, Frederick became the first King in Prussia, as Frederick I.
Regency of Maria Clara of Berg-'s-Heerenberg and Francis Anton, Count of Haigerloch (1689-1691)						
Meinrad II	1 November 1673; Sigmaringen; Son of Maximilian I and Maria Clara of Berg-'s-Heerenberg	13 August 1689 – 20 October 1715	Principality of Sigmaringen	Johanna Catharina of Montfort-Tettnang; 22 November 1700; Sigmaringen four children	20 October 1715; Sigmaringen aged 41	
George Frederick II the Younger	3 May 1678; Ansbach; Second son of John Frederick and Johanna Elisabeth of Baden-Durlach	16 October 1692 – 29 March 1703	Principality of Ansbach	Unmarried	29 March 1703; Schmidmühlen aged 24	Died without descendants; he was succeeded by his brother.
Ferdinand Leopold	4 December 1692; Sigmaringen Castle; First son of Francis Anton and Anna Maria Eusebia of Königsegg-Aulendorf	14 October 1702 – 23 July 1750	County of Haigerloch	Unmarried	23 July 1750; Brühl Palace aged 57	Member of the clergy and first minister of the Electorate of Cologne. Left no children. The county passed to his brother.
William Frederick	6 January 1686; Ansbach; Son of John Frederick and Eleonore Erdmuthe of Saxe-Eisenach	29 March 1703 – 7 January 1723	Principality of Ansbach	Christiane Charlotte of Württemberg-Winnental; 28 August 1709; Stuttgart three children	7 January 1723; Unterreichenbach aged 36	
Regency of Frederick I, King of Prussia (1711-1713); Regency of Frederick William I, King of Prussia (1713-1718)						Left no male descendants. The title passed to his brother, Frederick Henry.
Frederick William the Mad	17 November 1700; Oranienbaum; First son of Philip William and Johanna Charlotte of Anhalt-Dessau	19 December 1711 – 4 March 1771	March of Schwedt	Sophia Dorothea of Prussia; 10 November 1734; Potsdam five children	4 March 1771; Swobnica aged 70	Left no male descendants. The title passed to his brother, Frederick Henry.
George William	26 November 1678; Bayreuth; Son of Christian Ernest and Sophie Luise of Württemberg	20 May 1712 – 18 December 1726	Principality of Bayreuth	Sophie of Saxe-Weissenfels; 16 October 1699; Leipzig five children	18 December 1726; Bayreuth aged 48	
Frederick William I the Soldier	16 March 1687; Berlin; Son of Frederick III & I and Sophia Charlotte of Hanover	25 February 1713 – 28 June 1757	Kingdom of Prussia (with Electorate of Brandenburg)	Sophia Dorothea of Hanover; 28 November 1706; Hanover (by proxy); 27 December 1706; Berlin (in person) two children	28 June 1757; City Palace, Potsdam aged 70	
Regency of Johanna Catharina of Montfort-Tettnang (1715-1720)						
Joseph Frederick Ernest	24 May 1702; Sigmaringen; Son of Meinrad II and Johanna Catharina of Montfort-Tettnang	2 October 1715 – 8 December 1769	Principality of Sigmaringen	Maria Franziska of Oettingen-Spielberg; 20 May 1722; Oettingen six children Maria Judith Katharina of Closen; 5 July 1738 three children Maria Theresa of Waldburg-Trachburg; 22 October 1743 no children	8 December 1769; Haigerloch aged 41	
Regency of Christiane Charlotte of Württemberg-Winnental (1723–1729)						
Charles William Frederick the Wild	12 May 1712; Ansbach; Son of William Frederick and Christiane Charlotte of Württemberg-Winnental	7 January 1723 – 3 August 1757	Principality of Ansbach	Friederike Luise of Prussia; 30 May 1729; Berlin two children	3 August 1757; Gunzenhausen aged 45	
George Frederick Charles	30 June 1688 near Mühlhausen; Son of George William and Sophie of Saxe-Weissenfels	18 December 1726 – 17 May 1735	Principality of Bayreuth	Dorothea of Sonderburg-Beck; 17 April 1709; Reinfeld five children	17 May 1735; Bayreuth aged 46	
Frederick	10 May 1711; Weferlingen; Son of George Frederick Charles and Dorothea of Sonderburg-Beck	17 May 1735 – 26 February 1763	Principality of Bayreuth	Wilhelmine of Prussia; 17 April 1709; Berlin one child Sophie Caroline of Brunswick-Wolfenbüttel; 20 September 1759; Brunswick no children	26 February 1763; Bayreuth aged 51	Left no male descendants; the title passed to Frederick Christian, from a collateral Bayreuth line.
Frederick Louis	1 September 1688; Strasbourg; Son of Frederick William and Maria Leopoldine von Sinzendorf	14 November 1735 – 4 June 1750	Principality of Hechingen	Unmarried	4 June 1750; Hechingen aged 61	Left no children. He was succeeded by a cousin.
Joseph Frederick William	12 November 1717; Bayreuth; Son of Herman Frederick of Hohenzollern-Hechingen and Maria Josepha of Oettingen	4 June 1750 – 9 April 1798	Principality of Hechingen	Maria Teresa Folch de Cardona y Silva (4 September 1732 - 25 September 1750); 2 June 1750; Vienna no children Maria Theresa of Waldburg-Zeil; 7 January 1751; Hechingen six children	9 April 1798; Hechingen aged 80	Great-grandson of John George. Left no surviving children. He was succeeded by his nephew.
Francis Christopher Anton	1 January 1699; Haigerloch; Second son of Francis Anton and Anna Maria Eusebia of Königsegg-Aulendorf	23 July 1750 – 23 November 1767	County of Haigerloch	Unmarried	23 November 1767; Cologne aged 68	Also member of the clergy and first minister of the Electorate of Cologne. He also didn't have children. The county returned definitively to Sigmaringen.
Haigerloch definitely annexed to Sigmaringen
Frederick II the Great	24 January 1712; Berlin; Son of Frederick William I and Sophia Dorothea of Hanover	28 June 1757 – 17 August 1786	Kingdom of Prussia (with Electorate of Brandenburg)	Elisabeth Christine of Brunswick-Wolfenbüttel; 12 June 1733; Castle Salzdahlum no children	17 August 1786; Potsdam aged 74	
Charles Alexander	24 February 1736; Son of Charles William Frederick and Friederike Luise of Prussia	3 August 1757 – 16 January 1791	Principality of Ansbach	Frederica Caroline of Saxe-Coburg-Saalfeld; 22 November 1754; Coburg no children Elizabeth Craven; 13/30 October 1791; Lisbon (morganatic) no children	5 January 1806; Speen, Berkshire aged 69	In 1769 reunited both Margraviates of Ansbach and Bayreuth.In 1791 sold both Margraviates to the Kingdom of Prussia.
Ansbach sold to Prussia
Frederick Christian	17 July 1708; Weferlingen; Son of Christian Henry of Brandenburg-Bayreuth and Sophie Christiane of Wolfstein	26 February 1763 – 20 January 1769	Principality of Bayreuth	Victoria Charlotte of Anhalt-Zeitz-Hoym; 26 April 1732; Schaumburg two children	20 January 1769; Bayreuth aged 60	Great-grandson of Christian I and cousin of his predecessors. Left no male descendants; Bayreuth was reunited to Ansbach.
Bayreuth definitively annexed to Ansbach
Charles Frederick	9 January 1724; Sigmaringen; Son of Joseph Frederick Ernest and Maria Franziska of Oettingen-Spielberg	8 December 1769 – 20 December 1785	Principality of Sigmaringen	Johanna of Hohenzollern-Berg; 2 March 1749; Kail Castle, near Trier twelve children	20 December 1785; Krauchenwies aged 61	
Frederick Henry	21 August 1709; Schwedt; Second son of Philip William and Johanna Charlotte of Anhalt-Dessau	4 March 1771 – 12 December 1788	March of Schwedt	Leopoldine Marie of Anhalt-Dessau; 13 February 1739 two children	12 December 1788; Schwedt aged 79	Left no male descendants. Schwedt went back to Prussia.
Schwedt definitively annexed to Prussia
Anton Aloys	20 June 1762; Sigmaringen; Son of Charles Frederick and Johanna of Hohenzollern-Berg	20 December 1785 – 17 October 1831	Principality of Sigmaringen	Amalie Zephyrine of Salm-Kyrburg; 13 August 1782; Kirn two children	17 October 1831; Sigmaringen aged 69	
Frederick William II	25 September 1744; Berlin Palace; Son of Frederick William I and Louise Henriette of Orange-Nassau	17 August 1786 – 16 November 1797	Kingdom of Prussia (with Electorate of Brandenburg)	Elisabeth Christine of Brunswick-Wolfenbüttel; 14 June 1765; Castle Salzdahlum (annulled 1769) no children Frederica Louisa of Hesse-Darmstadt; 14 July 1769; Charlottenburg Palace eight children Julie von Voss; 7 April 1787; Charlottenburg Palace (morganatic) one child Sophie von Dönhoff; 11 April 1790; Charlottenburg Palace (morganatic, annulled 1792) two children	16 November 1797; Marmorpalais aged 53	Nephew of his predecessor.
Frederick William III	3 August 1770; Potsdam; Son of Frederick William II and Frederica Louisa of Hesse-Darmstadt	16 November 1797 – 7 June 1840	Kingdom of Prussia (with Electorate of Brandenburg until 1806)	Louise of Mecklenburg-Strelitz; 24 December 1793; Darmstadt nine children Auguste von Harrach; 9 November 1824; Charlottenburg Palace (morganatic) no children	7 June 1840; Berlin aged 69	In 1806, with the dissolving of the Holy Roman Empire, Prussia lost its electoral status.
Herman	30 July 1751; Lockenhaus; Son of Francis Xavier of Hohenzollern-Hechingen and Anna von Hoensbroech	9 April 1798 – 2 November 1810	Principality of Hechingen	Louise of Merode-Westerloo (28 September 1748 - 14 November 1774); 18 November 1773; Maastricht one child Maximiliane of Gavre (30 November 1753 - 6 August 1778); 15 February 1775; Brussels one child Maria Antonia of Waldburg-Zeil (6 June 1753 - 25 October 1814); 12 June 1779; Dagstuhl five children	2 November 1810; Hechingen aged 59	Nephew of Joseph Frederick William.
Frederick Herman Otto	22 July 1776; Namur; Son of Herman and Maximiliane of Gavre	2 November 1810 – 13 September 1838	Principality of Hechingen	Luise Pauline Maria Biron; 26 April 1800; Prague one child	13 September 1838; Hechingen aged 62	
Charles	20 February 1785; Sigmaringen; Son of Anton Aloys and Amalie Zephyrine of Salm-Kyrburg	17 October 1831 – 27 August 1848	Principality of Sigmaringen	Marie Antoinette Murat; 4 February 1808; Paris four children Catharina of Hohenlohe-Schillingsfürst; 14 March 1848; Kupferzell no children	11 March 1853; Bologna aged 68	During the German revolutions of 1848–1849, he abdicated to his son.
Constantine	16 February 1801; Żagań; Son of Frederick Herman Otto and Luise Pauline Maria Biron	13 September 1838 – 7 December 1849	Principality of Hechingen	Eugénie de Beauharnais; 22 May 1826; Eichstätt no children Amalie Schenk von Geyern; September 1847 (morganatic) three children	3 September 1889; Zielona Góra aged 68	Pressed by the German Revolution, in 1849 he signed the hand-over of the Principality to Prussia.
Hechingen definitely annexed to Prussia
Frederick William IV	15 October 1795; Kronprinzenpalais; First son of Frederick William III and Louise of Mecklenburg-Strelitz	7 June 1840 – 2 January 1861	Kingdom of Prussia	Elisabeth Ludovika of Bavaria; 16 November 1823; Munich (by proxy); 29 November 1823; Berlin (in person) no children	2 January 1861; Sanssouci aged 55	Also President of the Erfurt Union (1849–1850). Left no children, and was succeeded by his brother, who already held regency since 1858.
Regency of Prince William of Prussia (1858-1861)						Also President of the Erfurt Union (1849–1850). Left no children, and was succeeded by his brother, who already held regency since 1858.
Charles Anton	7 September 1811; Krauchenwies; Son of Charles and Marie Antoinette Murat	27 August 1848 – 7 December 1849	Principality of Sigmaringen	Josephine of Baden; 21 October 1834; Karlsruhe six children	2 June 1885; Sigmaringen aged 73	Still pressed by the German Revolution, in 1849 he signed the hand-over of the Principality to Prussia. His son Karl would become, in 1881, King of Romania; his daughter Stephanie became Queen of Portugal.
Sigmaringen definitely annexed to Prussia
William I the Great	22 March 1797; Kronprinzenpalais; Second son of Frederick William III and Louise of Mecklenburg-Strelitz	2 January 1861 – 9 March 1888	Kingdom of Prussia (until 1871) German Empire (with Kingdom of Prussia; from 1871)	Augusta of Saxe-Weimar-Eisenach; 11 June 1829; Charlottenburg Palace two children	9 March 1888; Charlottenburg Palace aged 90	Previously regent on behalf of his ill brother, he inherited his throne. He was also President of the North German Confederation (1867–1871), before becoming German Emperor.
Carol I	20 April 1839; Sigmaringen Castle; Son of Charles Anton, Prince of Hohenzollern-Sigmaringen and Josephine of Baden	20 April 1866 – 10 October 1914	Principality of Romania (until 1881) Kingdom of Romania (from 1881) (Sigmaringen branch)	Elisabeth of Wied; 15 November 1869; Neuwied one child	10 October 1914; Peleș Castle aged 75	Karl of Hohenzollern-Sigmaringen was invited to assume the Romanian throne in 1866. Left no male descendants. The throne went to his nephew.
Frederick III	18 October 1831; New Palace, Potsdam; Son of William I and Augusta of Saxe-Weimar-Eisenach	9 March – 15 June 1888	German Empire (with Kingdom of Prussia)	Victoria of the United Kingdom; 25 January 1858; St James's Palace eight children	15 June 1888; New Palace, Potsdam aged 56	
William II	27 January 1859; Kronprinzenpalais; Son of Frederick III and Victoria of the United Kingdom	15 June 1888 – 9 November 1918	German Empire (with Kingdom of Prussia)	Augusta Victoria of Schleswig-Holstein; 27 February 1881; Berlin seven children Hermine Reuss of Greiz; 5 November 1922; Huis Doorn no children	4 June 1941; Huis Doorn aged 82	In 1918, he abdicated his throne; The monarchy was abolished.
Ferdinand	24 August 1865; Sigmaringen Castle; Son of Prince Leopold of Hohenzollern-Sigmaringen and Antónia of Portugal	10 October 1914 – 20 July 1927	Kingdom of Romania (Sigmaringen branch)	Marie of the United Kingdom; 10 January 1893; Sigmaringen Castle six children	20 July 1927; Peleș Castle aged 61	
Mihai I	25 October 1921; Peleș Castle; Son of Prince Carol of Romania and Helen of Greece and Denmark	20 July 1927 – 8 June 1930 6 September 1940 – 30 December 1947	Kingdom of Romania (Sigmaringen branch)	Anne of Bourbon-Parma; 10 June 1948; Athens five children	5 December 2017; Aubonne aged 96	Given his father removed himself from the line of succession, he was the chosen successor of his grandfather. As he was a child, he ruled under a Council of Regency. In 1930, Michael's father returned to Romania and took the throne. In 1940, as he abdicated, Michael returned to the throne, but he also abdicated in 1947. The monarchy was abolished.
Carol II	15 October 1893; Peleș Castle; Son of Ferdinand and Marie of the United Kingdom	8 June 1930 – 6 September 1940	Kingdom of Romania (Sigmaringen branch)	Zizi Lambrino; 31 August 1918; Transfiguration Cathedral in Odesa (morganatic, annulled 1919) one child Helen of Greece and Denmark; 10 March 1921; Metropolitan Cathedral of Athens (divorced 1928)one child Magda Lupescu (morganatic); 3 June/5 July 1947; Rio de Janeiro no children	4 April 1953; Estoril aged 59	After giving up his rights in his father's lifetime, Carol returned to Romania in 1930 and ascended the throne, but abdicated again in 1940.

== Family tree of the House of Hohenzollern ==
House of Hohenzollern

House of Hohenzollern
Burkhard I Count of Zollern r. ?–1061 before 1025–1061
Frederick I Count of Zollern r. ?–before 1125 ?–before 1125
Frederick II; Count of Zollern r. c. 1125–1145 before 1125–c. 1145	Burkhard II; Count of Zollern r. c. 1145–1150/5	Gotfried; Count of Zollern r. c. 1150/5–1160
Frederick I Burgrave of Nuremberg r. c. 1192–1200; Frederick III; Count of Zollern r. after 1145–c. 1200 before 1139–c. 1200
Franconian Branch	Swabian Branch
Conrad I Burgrave of Nuremberg r. 1218–1261 c. 1186–1261	Frederick IV; Count of Hohenzollern r. 1218–1255; Frederick II; Burgrave of Nuremberg r. 1204–1218 c. 1188–1255
Frederick III; Burgrave of Nuremberg r. 1261–1297 c. 1220–1297	Frederick V the Illustrious; Count of Hohenzollern r. 1255–1289 ?–1289
John I Burgrave of Nuremberg r. 1297–1300 c. 1279–1300	Frederick IV; Burgrave of Nuremberg r. 1300–1332; 1287–1332	Frederick VI the Knight; Count of Hohenzollern r. 1289–1298 ?–1298
John II the Acquirer; Burgrave of Nuremberg r. 1332–1357 c. 1309–1357	Frederick VII; Count of Hohenzollern r. 1298–1309 ?–1309	Frederick VIII; Easter Sunday; Count of Hohenzollern r. 1309–1333 ?–1333
Frederick V Burgrave of Nuremberg r. 1357–1397; 1333–1398	Frederick IX the Old; Count of Hohenzollern r. 1333–1377/9 ?–1377/9	Frederick; Count of Strasbourg
Brandenburg- Prussian Branch
John III; Burgrave of Nuremberg r. 1397–1420; John I Margrave of Brandenburg- Kulmbach r. 1398–1420 c. 1369–1420	Frederick I Elector of Brandenburg r. 1415–1440; Frederick VI; Burgrave of Nuremberg r. 1397–1427; 1371–1440	Frederick X the Younger; Count of Hohenzollern r. 1377/9–1412 ?–1412	Frederick XI the Elder; Count of Hohenzollern r. 1377/9–1401 ?–1401
John II the Alchemist; Margrave of Brandenburg- Kulmbach r. 1440–1457; Margrave of Brandenburg r. 1426–1440; 1406–1464	Frederick II the Iron; Elector of Brandenburg r. 1440–1470; 1413–1471	Albrecht III; Achilles; Elector of Brandenburg r. 1471–1486; 1414–1486	Eitel Frederick I Count of Hohenzollern r. 1426–1439 c. 1384–1439	Frederick XII; Count of Hohenzollern r. 1401–1426 before 1401–1443
John II Cicero; Elector of Brandenburg r. 1486–1499; 1455–1499	Frederick II; Margrave of Brandenburg- Ansbach r. 1486–1536; Margrave of Brandenburg- Kulmbach r. 1495–1515; 1460–1536	Siegmund; Margrave of Brandenburg- Kulmbach r. 1486–1495; 1468–1495	Jobst Nicholas I Count of Hohenzollern r. 1433–1488; 1433–1488
Joachim I Nestor; Elector of Brandenburg r. 1499–1535; 1484–1535	Casimir; Margrave of Brandenburg- Kulmbach r. 1515–1527; 1481–1527	George; Margrave of Brandenburg- Ansbach r. 1536–1543; 1484–1543	Albert; Duke of Prussia r. 1525–1568; 1490–1568	Eitel Frederick II; Count of Hohenzollern r. 1488–1512 c. 1452–1512
Joachim II; Hector; Elector of Brandenburg r. 1535–1571; 1505–1571	John; Margrave of Brandenburg- Küstrin r. 1535–1571; 1513–1571	Albert II; Alcibiades; Margrave of Brandenburg- Kulmbach r. 1527–1553; 1522–1557	George; Frederick; Margrave of Brandenburg- Ansbach r. 1543–1603; Margrave of Brandenburg- Kulmbach r. 1553–1603; 1539–1603	Albert; Frederick; Duke of Prussia r. 1568–1618; 1553–1618	Eitel Frederick III; Count of Hohenzollern r. 1512-1525; 1494–1525
John George; Elector of Brandenburg r. 1571–1598; 1525–1598	Charles I Count of Hohenzollern r. 1525–1576; 1516–1576
House of Hohenzollern- Hechingen	House of Hohenzollern- Sigmaringen	House of Hohenzollern- Haigerloch
Joachim; Frederick; Elector of Brandenburg r. 1598–1608; 1546–1608	Christian; Margrave of Brandenburg- Bayreuth r. 1603–1655; 1581–1655	Joachim Ernest; Margrave of Brandenburg- Ansbach r. 1603–1625; 1583–1625	Eitel Frederick IV; Count of Hohenzollern- Hechingen r. 1576–1605; 1545–1605	Charles II; Count of Hohenzollern- Sigmaringen r. 1576–1606; 1547–1606	Christopher; Count of Hohenzollern- Haigerloch r. 1576–1592; 1552-1592
John; Sigismund; Elector of Brandenburg r. 1608–1619; Duke of Prussia r. 1618–1619; 1572–1619	Erdman; Augustus; 1615–1651	George Albert; 1619–1666	Frederick III; Margrave of Brandenburg- Ansbach r. 1625–1634; 1616–1634	Albert II; Margrave of Brandenburg- Ansbach r. 1634–1667; 1620–1667	John George; Count of Hohenzollern- Hechingen r. 1605–1623; Prince of Hohenzollern- Hechingen r. 1623; 1577–1623	John; Count of Hohenzollern- Sigmaringen r. 1606–1623; Prince of Hohenzollern- Sigmaringen r. 1623–1638; Count of Hohenzollern- Haigerloch r. 1634–1638; 1578–1638	John; Christopher; Count of Hohenzollern- Haigerloch r. 1592–1623; 1586–1623
George; William; Elector of Brandenburg; Duke of Prussia r. 1619–1640; 1595–1640	Christian; Ernest; Margrave of Brandenburg- Bayreuth r. 1655–1712; 1644–1712	Christian Henry; 1661–1708	John; Frederick; Margrave of Brandenburg- Ansbach r. 1667–1686; 1654–1686	Eitel Frederick V Prince of Hohenzollern- Hechingen r. 1623–1661; 1601–1661	Philip; Prince of Hohenzollern- Hechingen r. 1661–1671; 1616–1671	Meinrad I Prince of Hohenzollern- Sigmaringen; Count of Hohenzollern- Haigerloch r. 1638–1681; 1605–1681	Charles; Count of Hohenzollern- Haigerloch r. 1623–1634; 1588–1634
Frederick; William the Great Elector; Elector of Brandenburg; Duke of Prussia r. 1640–1688; 1620–1688	George; William; Margrave of Brandenburg- Bayreuth r. 1712–1726; 1678–1726	George Frederick; Charles; Margrave of Brandenburg- Bayreuth r. 1726–1735; 1688–1735	Frederick; Christian; Margrave of Brandenburg- Bayreuth r. 1763–1769; 1708–1769	Frederick; William; Prince of Hohenzollern- Hechingen r. 1671–1735; 1663–1735	Herman Frederick	Maximilian I Prince of Hohenzollern- Sigmaringen r. 1681–1689; 1636–1689	Francis; Anthony; Count of Hohenzollern- Haigerloch r. 1681–1702; 1657–1702
Brandenburg- Schwedt; Branch
Frederick I the Mercenary King; Duke of Prussia r. 1688–1701; King in Prussia r. 1701–1713; Frederick III; Elector of Brandenburg r. 1688–1713; 1657–1713	Philip; William; Margrave of Brandenburg- Schwedt r. 1688–1711; 1669–1711	Frederick; Margrave of Brandenburg- Bayreuth r. 1735–1763; 1711–1763	Christian; Albert; Margrave of Brandenburg- Ansbach r. 1686–1692; 1675–1692	George; Frederick II the Younger; Margrave of Brandenburg- Ansbach r. 1692–1703; 1678–1703	William; Frederick; Margrave of Brandenburg- Ansbach r. 1703–1723; 1686–1723	Frederick; Louis; Prince of Hohenzollern- Hechingen r. 1730–1750; 1688–1750	Joseph; Frederick William; Prince of Hohenzollern- Hechingen r. 1750–1798; 1717–1798	Francis Xavier	Meinrad II; Prince of Hohenzollern- Sigmaringen r. 1689–1715; Count of Hohenzollern- Haigerloch r. 1702–1715; 1673–1715	Ferdinand; Leopold; Count of Hohenzollern- Haigerloch r. 1702–1750; 1692–1750	Francis; Christopher; Anthony; Count of Hohenzollern- Haigerloch r. 1750–1767; 1699–1767
Frederick; William I the Soldier King; King in Prussia; Elector of Brandenburg r. 1713–1740; 1688–1740	Frederick; William; Margrave of Brandenburg- Schwedt r. 1731–1771; 1700–1771	Frederick; Henry; Margrave of Brandenburg- Schwedt r. 1771–1788; 1709–1788	Charles William; Frederick; Margrave of Brandenburg- Ansbach r. 1723–1757; 1712–1757	Herman; Prince of Hohenzollern- Hechingen r. 1798–1810; 1751–1810	Joseph; Frederick; Ernest; Prince of Hohenzollern- Sigmaringen r. 1715–1769; Count of Hohenzollern- Haigerloch r. 1767–1769; 1702–1769
Frederick II the Great; King in Prussia r. 1740–1772; King of Prussia r. 1772–1786; Elector of Brandenburg r. 1740–1786; 1712–1786	Augustus William; 1722–1758	Alexander; Margrave of Brandenburg- Ansbach r. 1757–1791; Margrave of Brandenburg- Bayreuth r. 1769–1791; 1736–1806	Frederick; Herman Otto; Prince of Hohenzollern- Hechingen r. 1810–1838; 1776–1838	Charles; Frederick; Prince of Hohenzollern- Sigmaringen r. 1769–1785; 1724–1785
Frederick; William II; King of Prussia; Elector of Brandenburg r. 1786–1797; 1744–1797	Constantine; Prince of Hohenzollern- Hechingen r. 1838–1849; 1801–1869	Anthony; Alois; Prince of Hohenzollern- Sigmaringen r. 1785–1831; 1762–1831
Frederick; William III; King of Prussia r. 1797–1840; Elector of Brandenburg r. 1797–1806; 1770–1840	Charles; Prince of Hohenzollern- Sigmaringen r. 1831–1848; 1785–1853
Frederick; William IV; King of Prussia r. 1840–1861; 1795–1861	William I German Emperor r. 1871–1888; King of Prussia r. 1861–1888; 1797–1888	Charles; Anthony; Prince of Hohenzollern- Sigmaringen r. 1848–1849; Prince of Hohenzollern r. 1869–1885; 1811–1885
Frederick III; German Emperor; King of Prussia r. 1888; 1831–1888	Leopold; Prince of Hohenzollern r. 1885–1905; 1835–1905	Charles I Domnitor of Romania r. 1866–1881; King of Romania r. 1881–1914; 1839–1914
Romanian Branch
William II; German Emperor; King of Prussia r. 1888–1918; 1859–1941	William; Prince of Hohenzollern r. 1905–1927; 1864–1927	Ferdinand I King of Romania r. 1914–1927; 1865–1927
Frederick; Prince of Hohenzollern r. 1927–1965; 1891–1965	Charles II; King of Romania r. 1930–1940; 1893–1953
Frederick; William; Prince of Hohenzollern r. 1965–2010; 1924–2010	Michael I King of Romania r. 1927–1930, 1940–1947; 1921–2017
Charles; Frederick; Prince of Hohenzollern r. 2010–present 1952–present

== Residences ==
=== Palaces of the Prussian Hohenzollerns ===
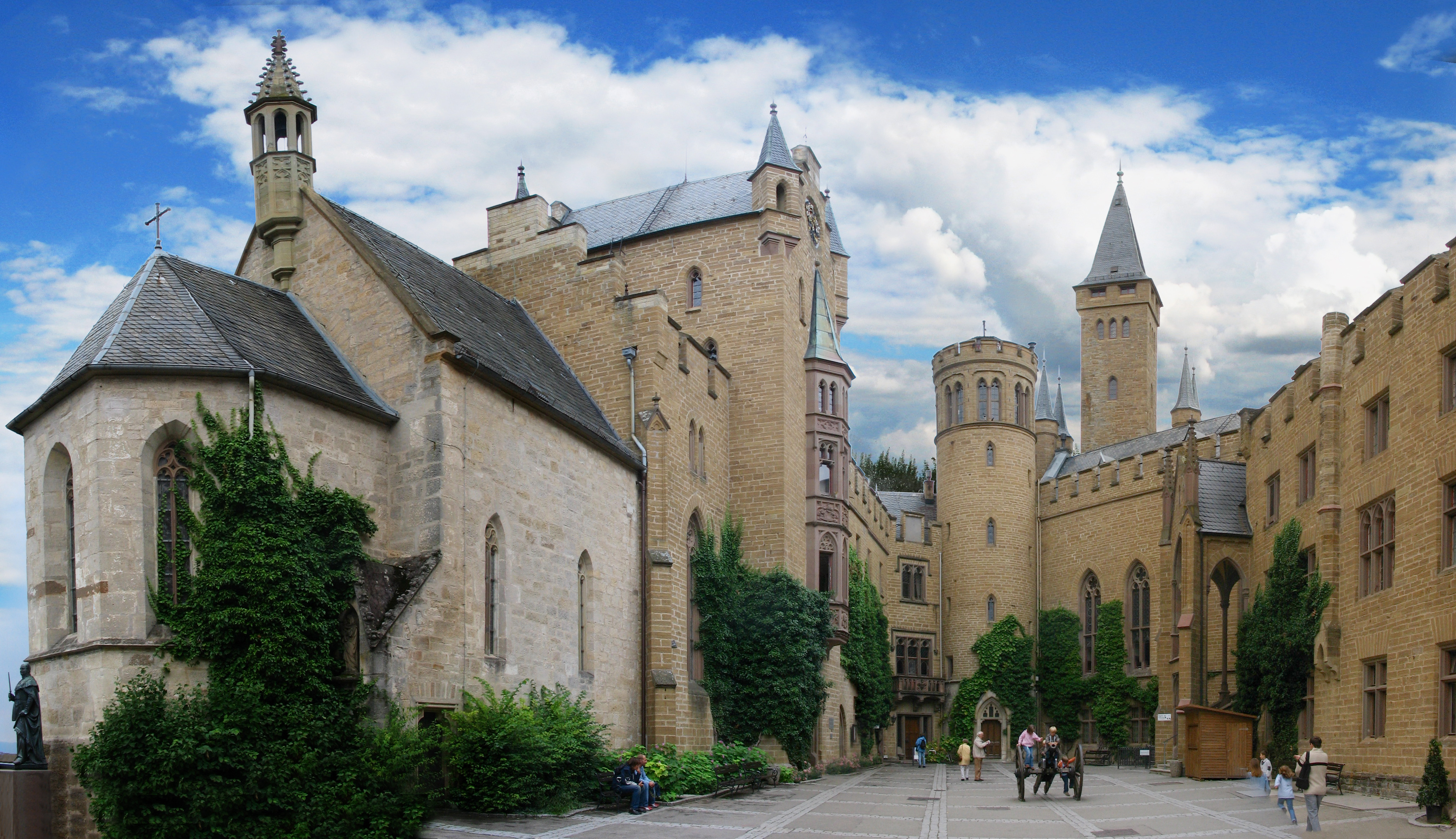
Hohenzollern Castle

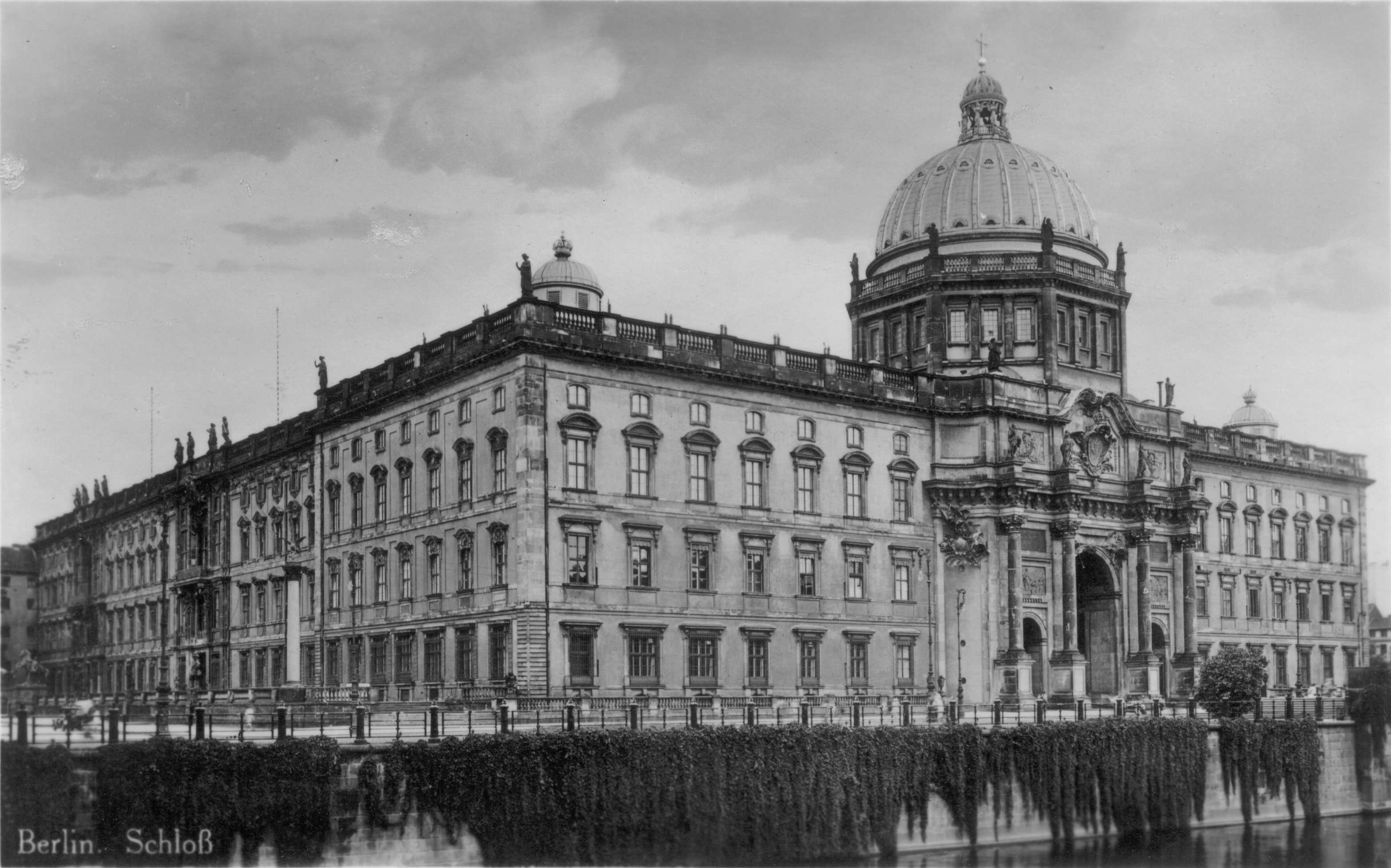
Berlin Palace

Charlottenburg Palace, Berlin

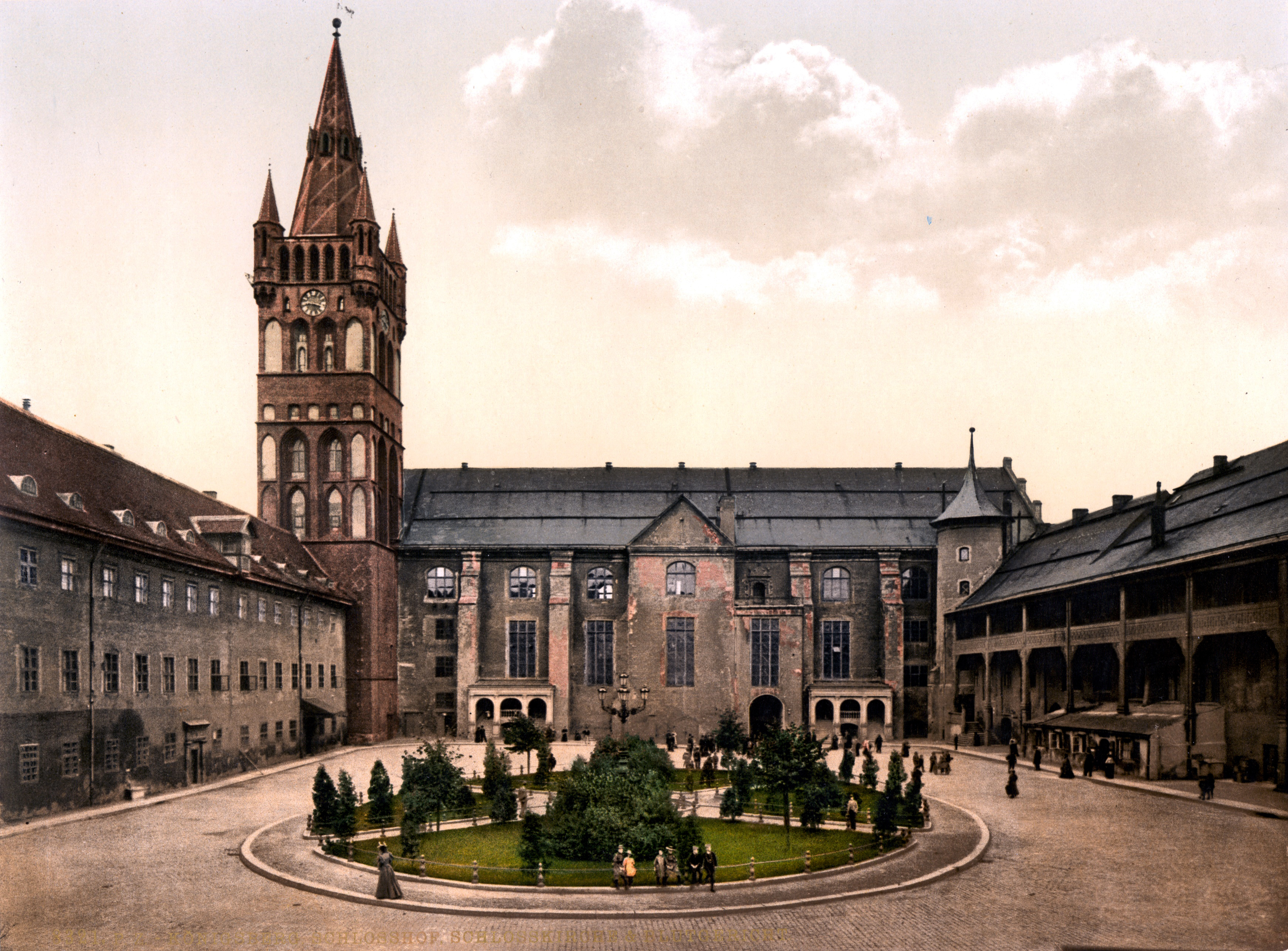
Königsberg Castle, Prussia

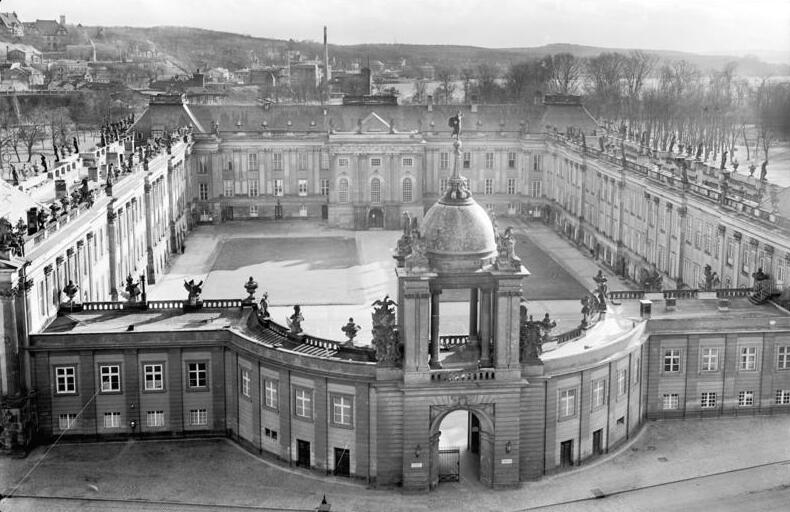
City Palace, Potsdam

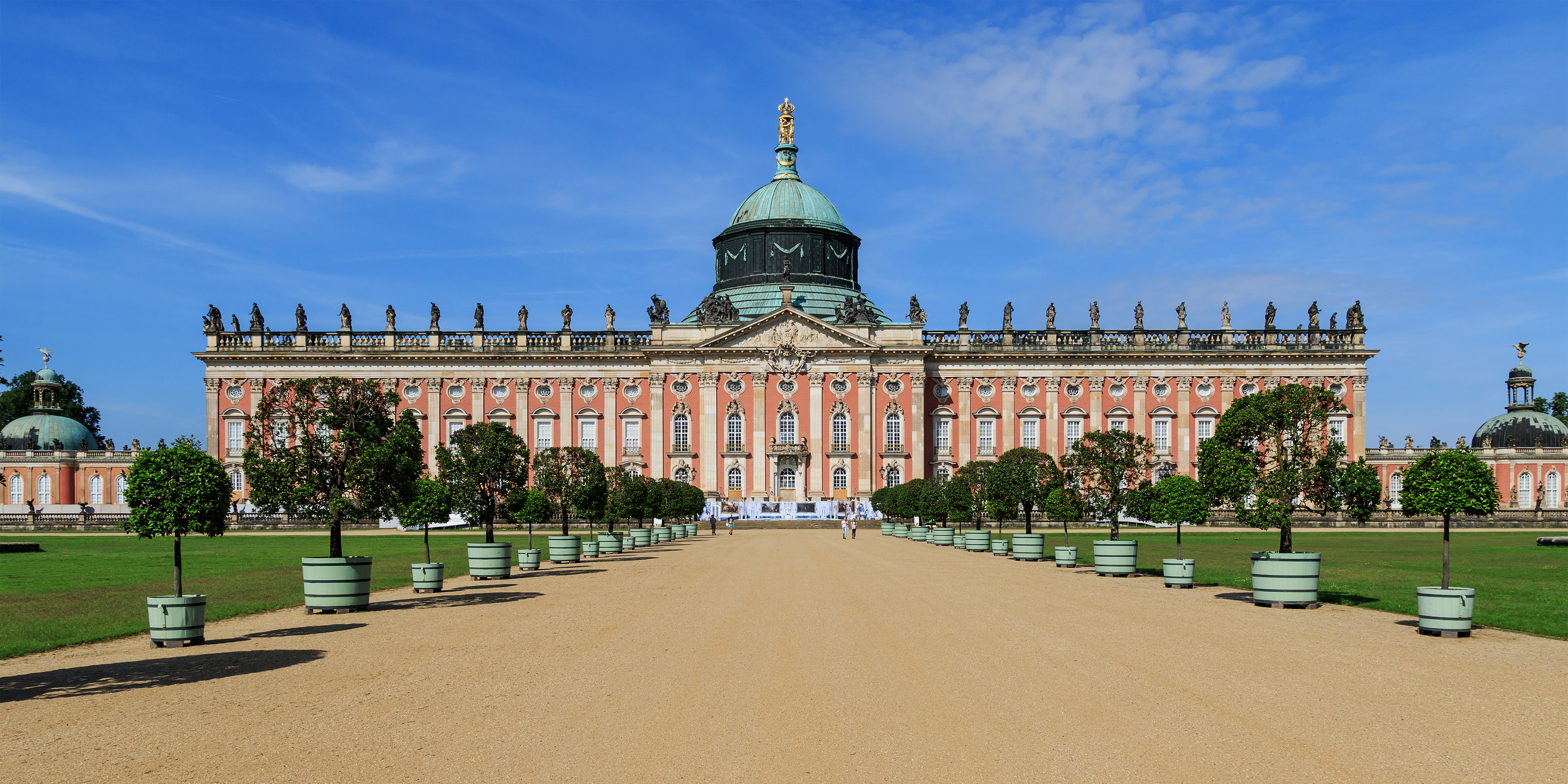
New Palace, Potsdam

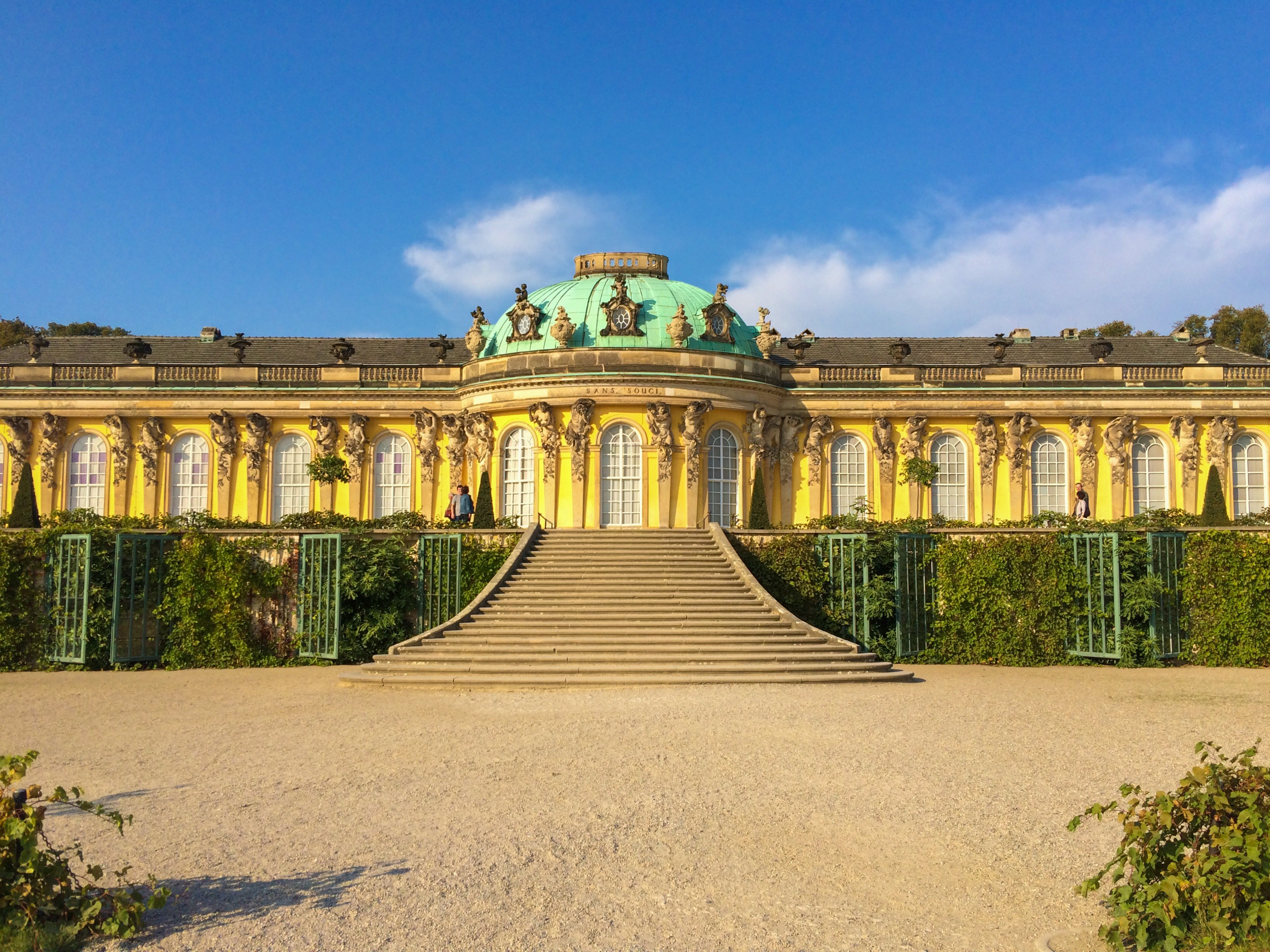
Sanssouci, Potsdam

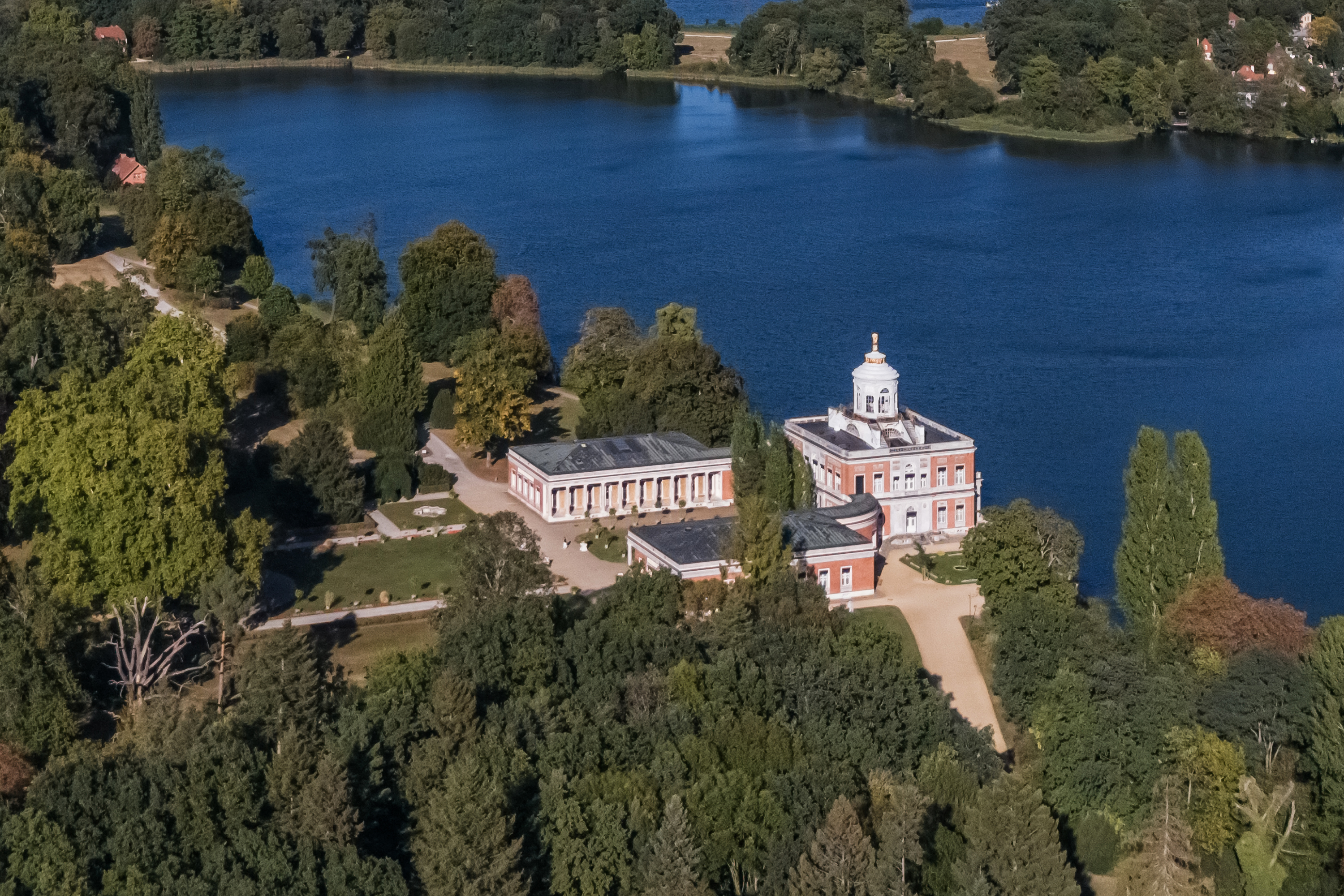
Marmorpalais, Potsdam

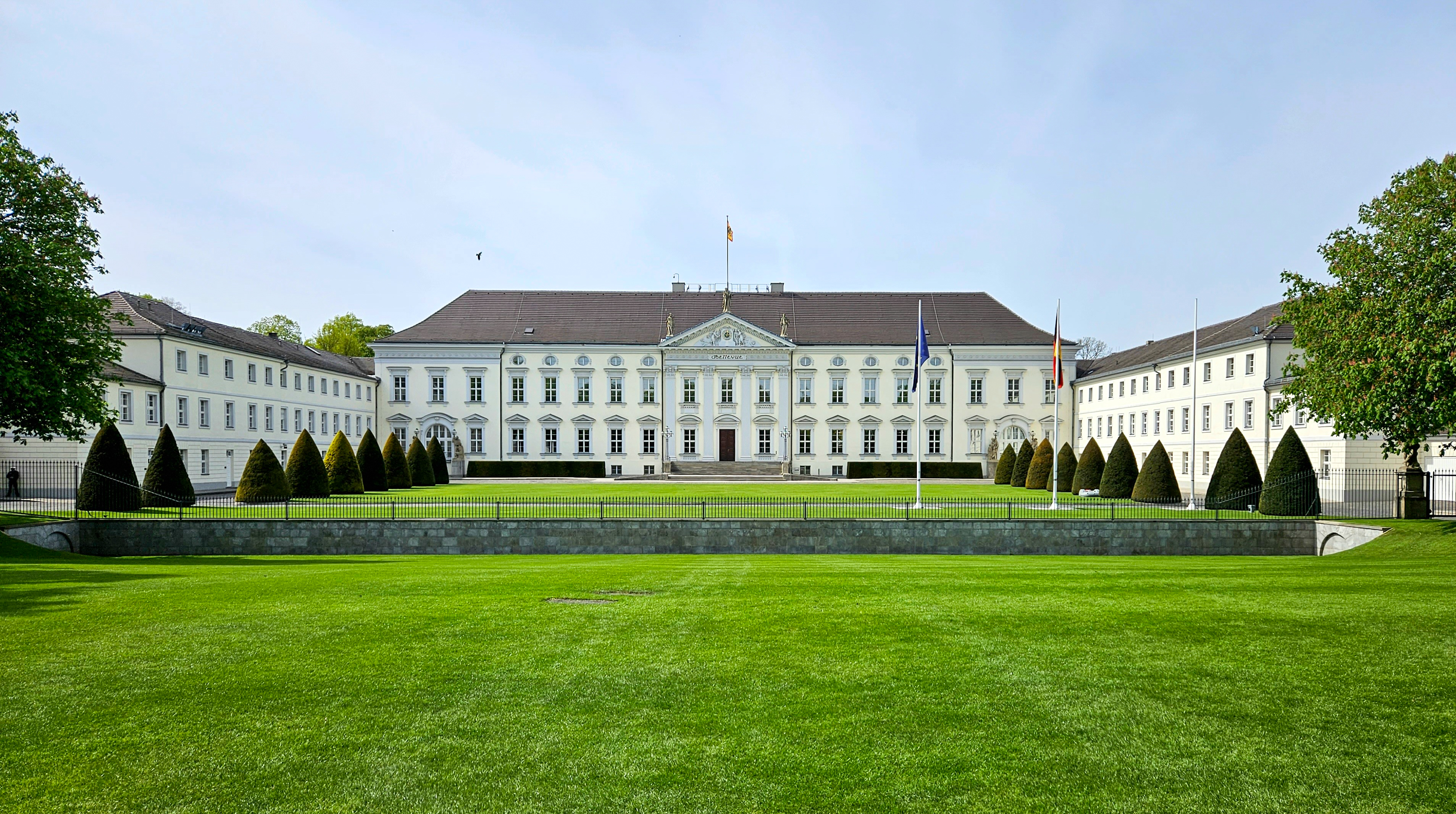
Bellevue Palace, Berlin

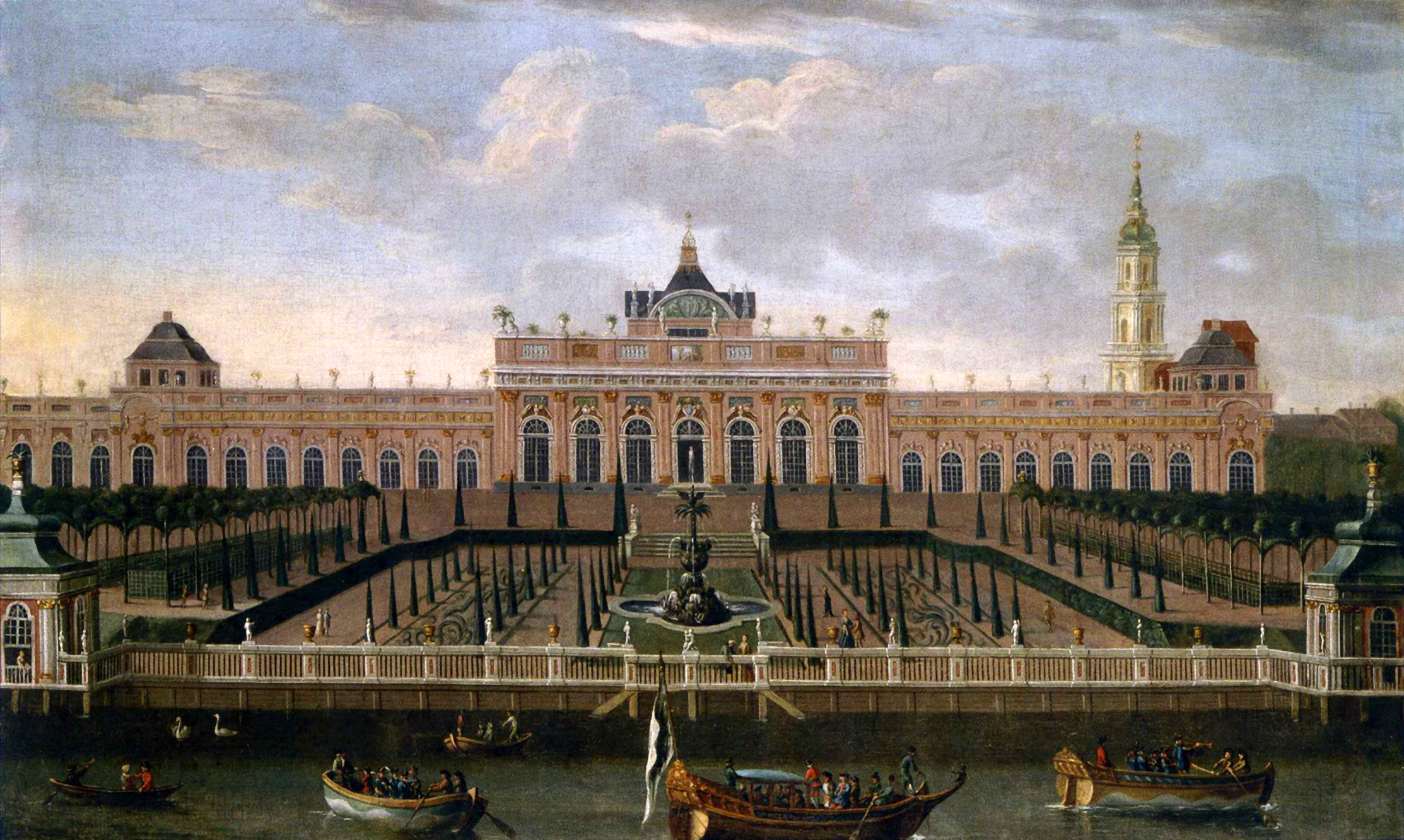
Monbijou Palace, Berlin

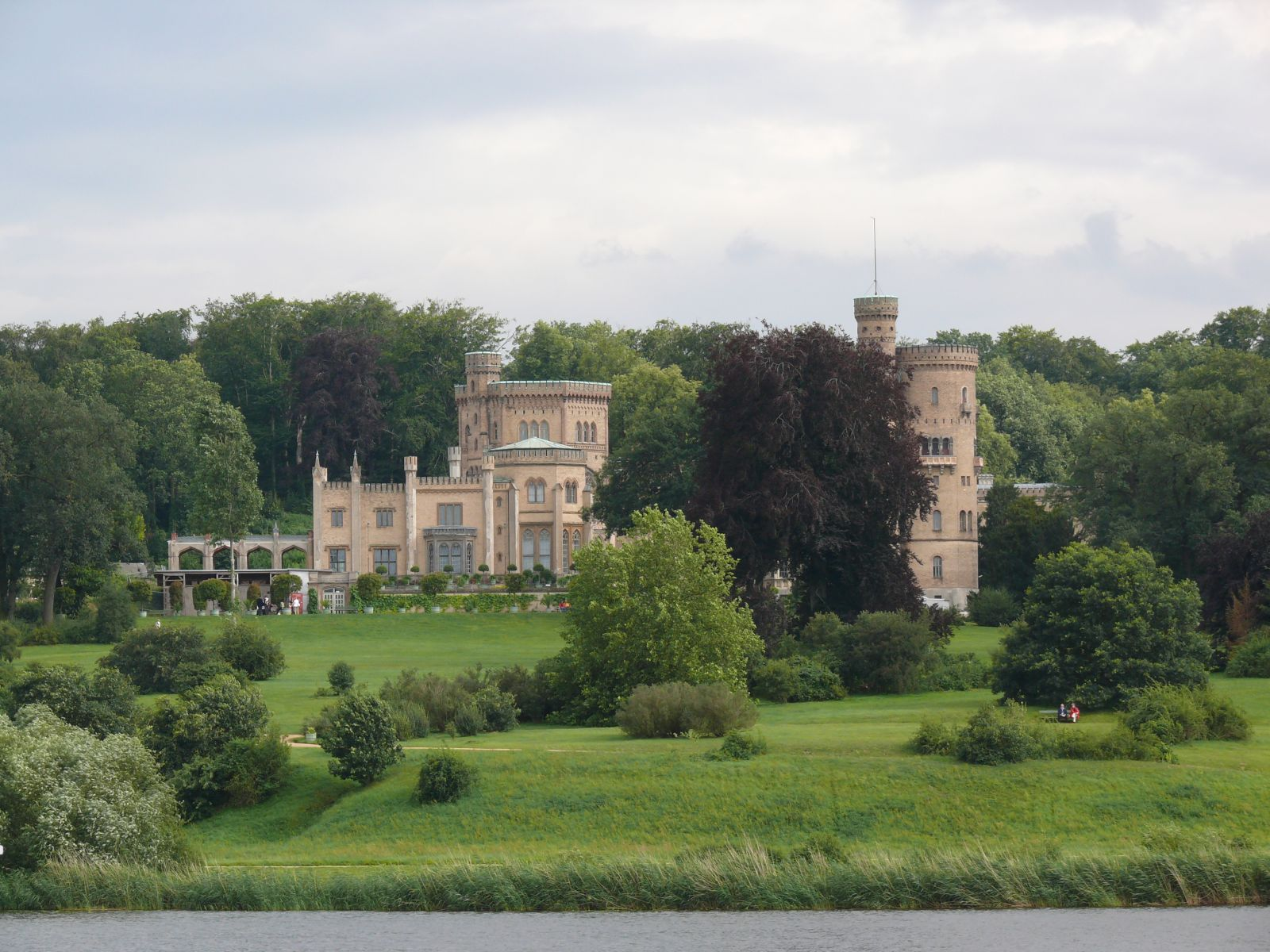
Babelsberg Palace, Potsdam

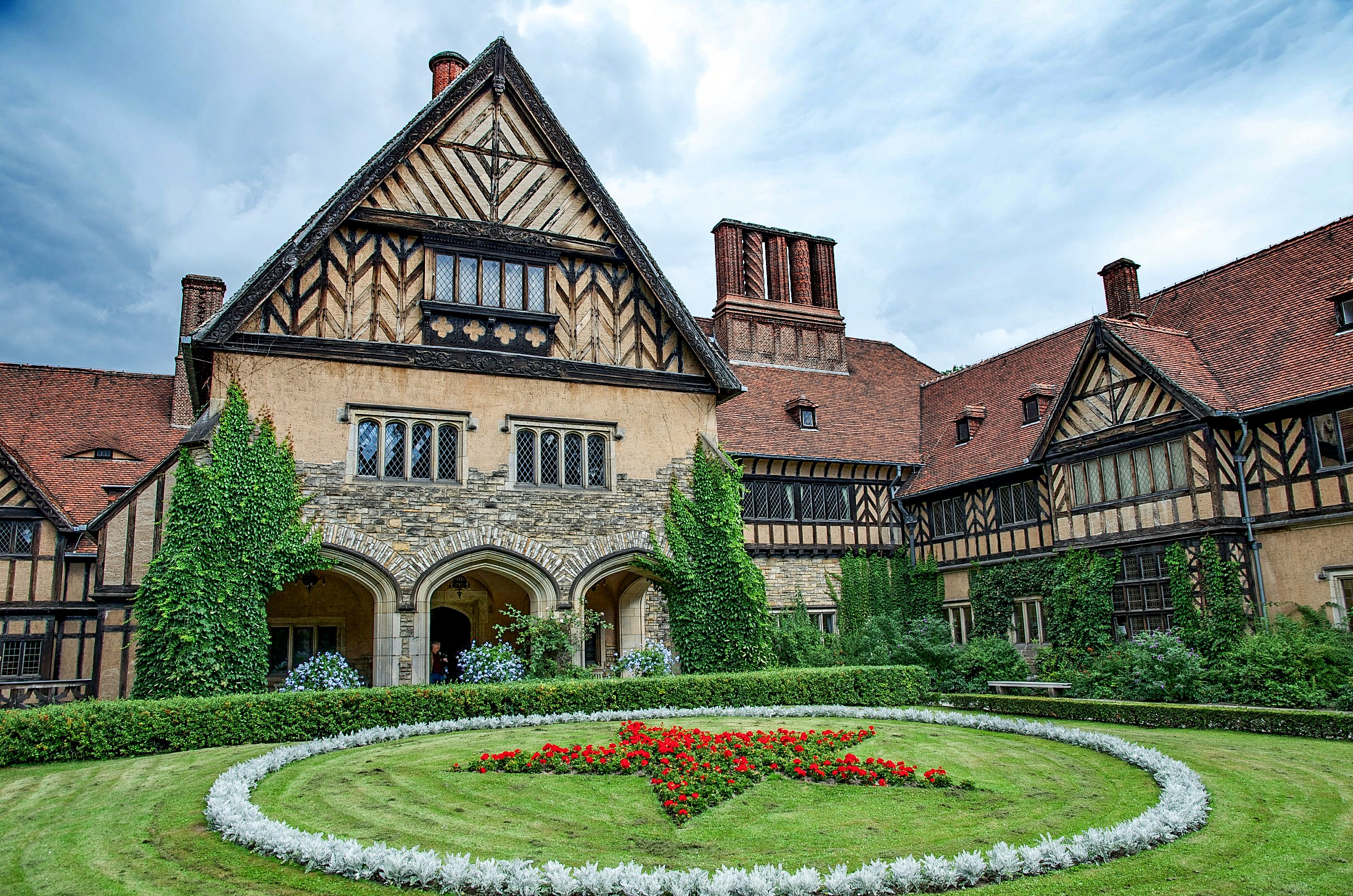
Cecilienhof Palace, Potsdam

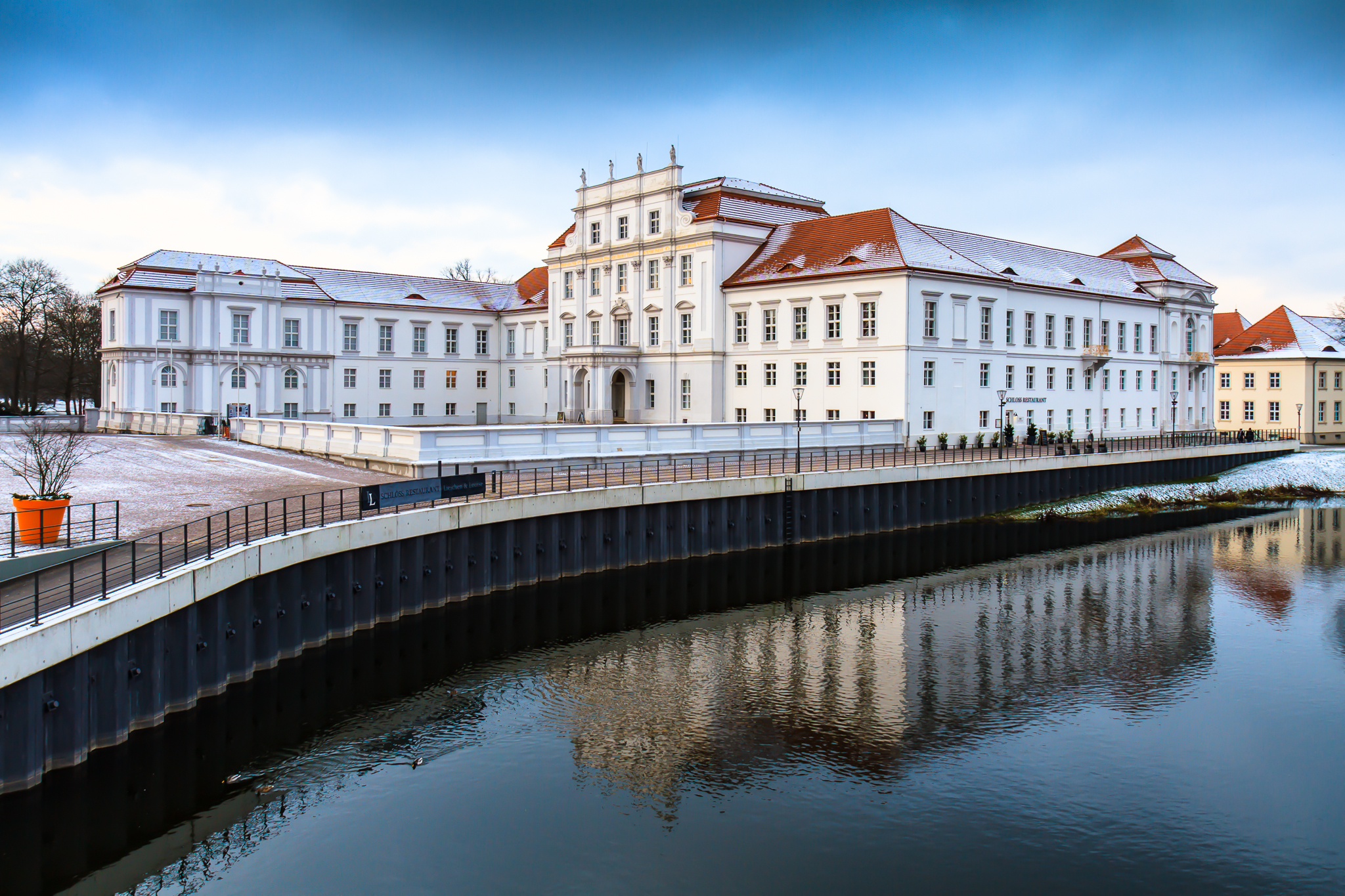
Oranienburg Palace

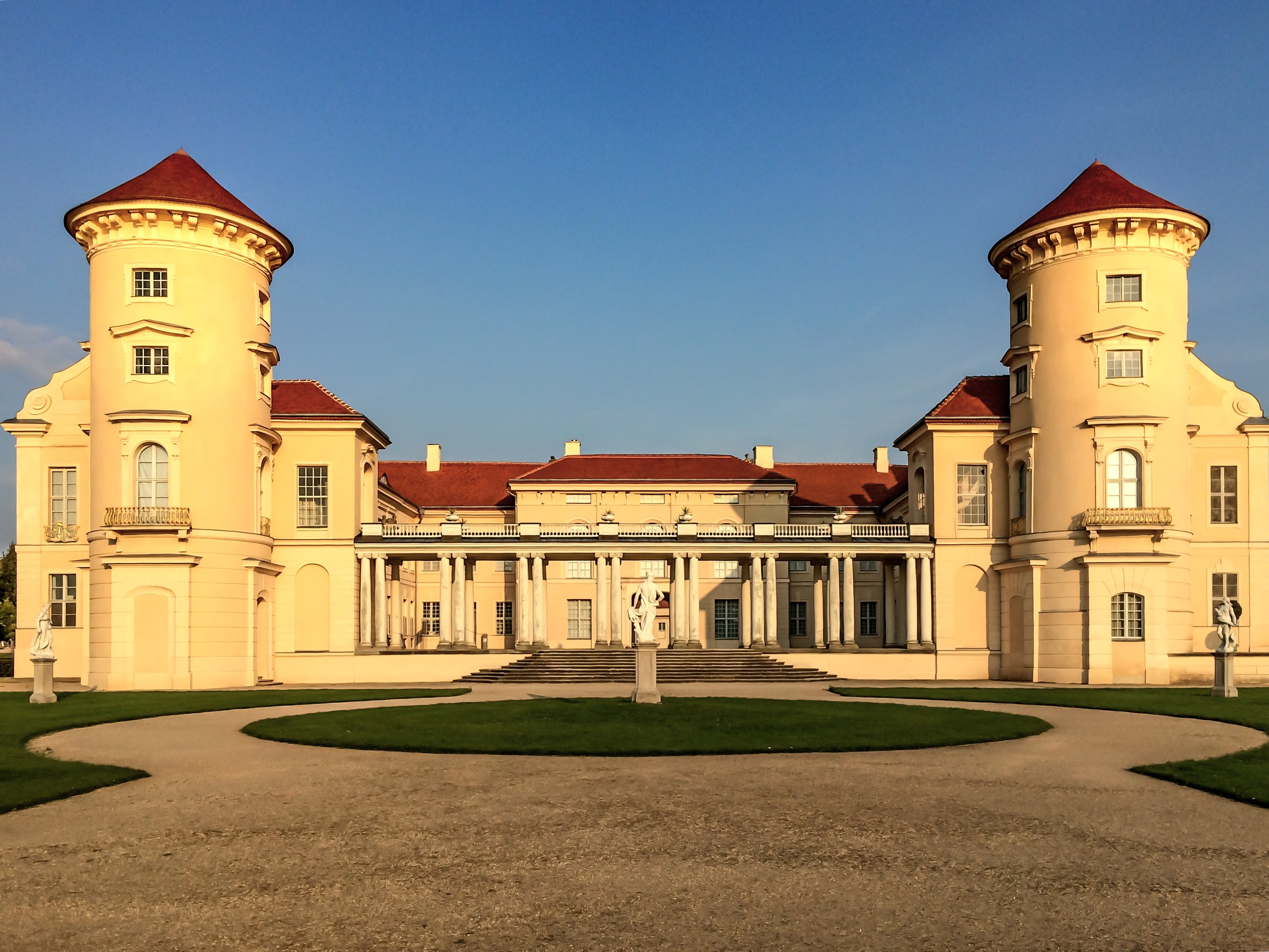
Rheinsberg Palace

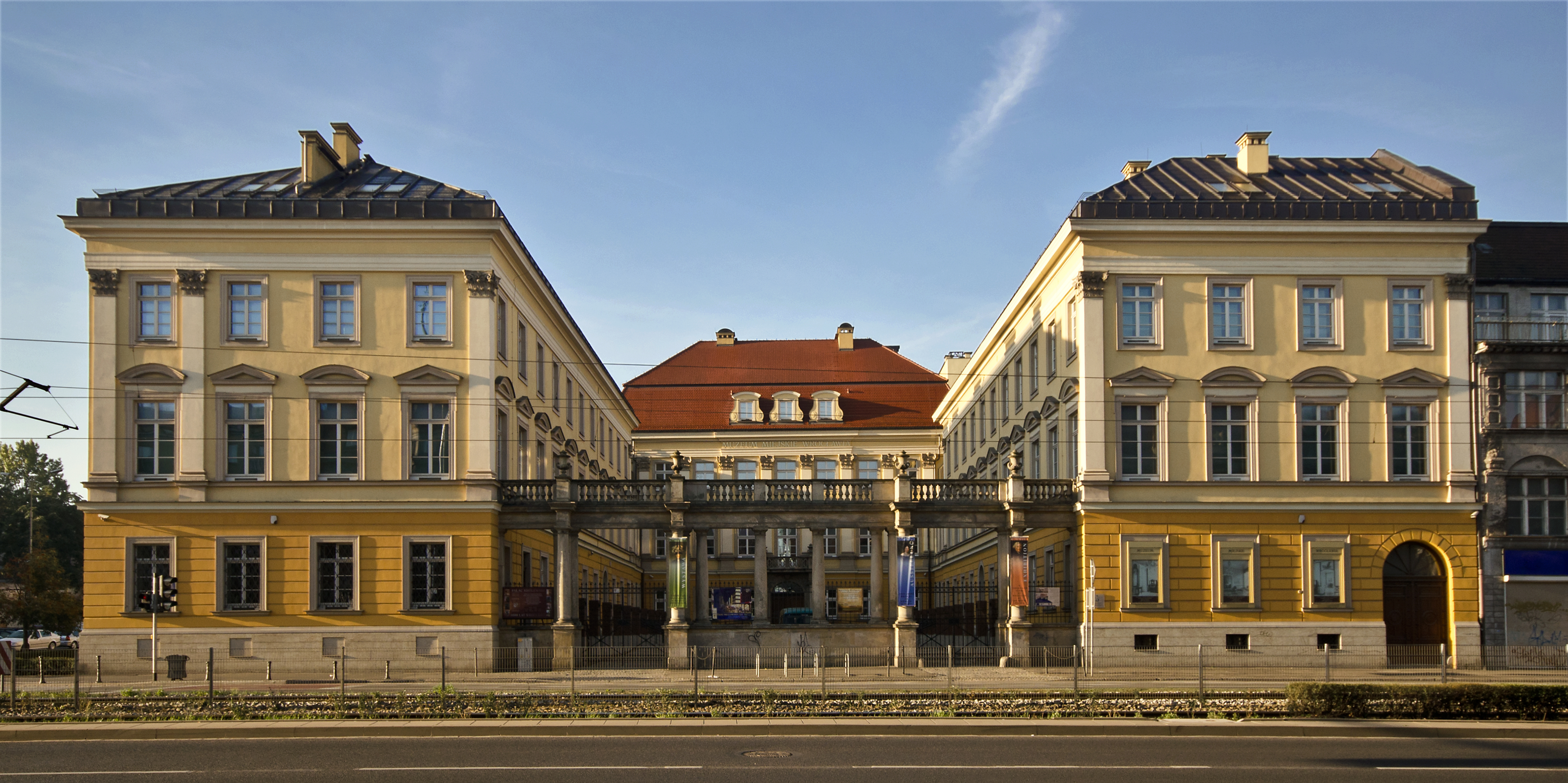
Wrocław Palace, Silesia

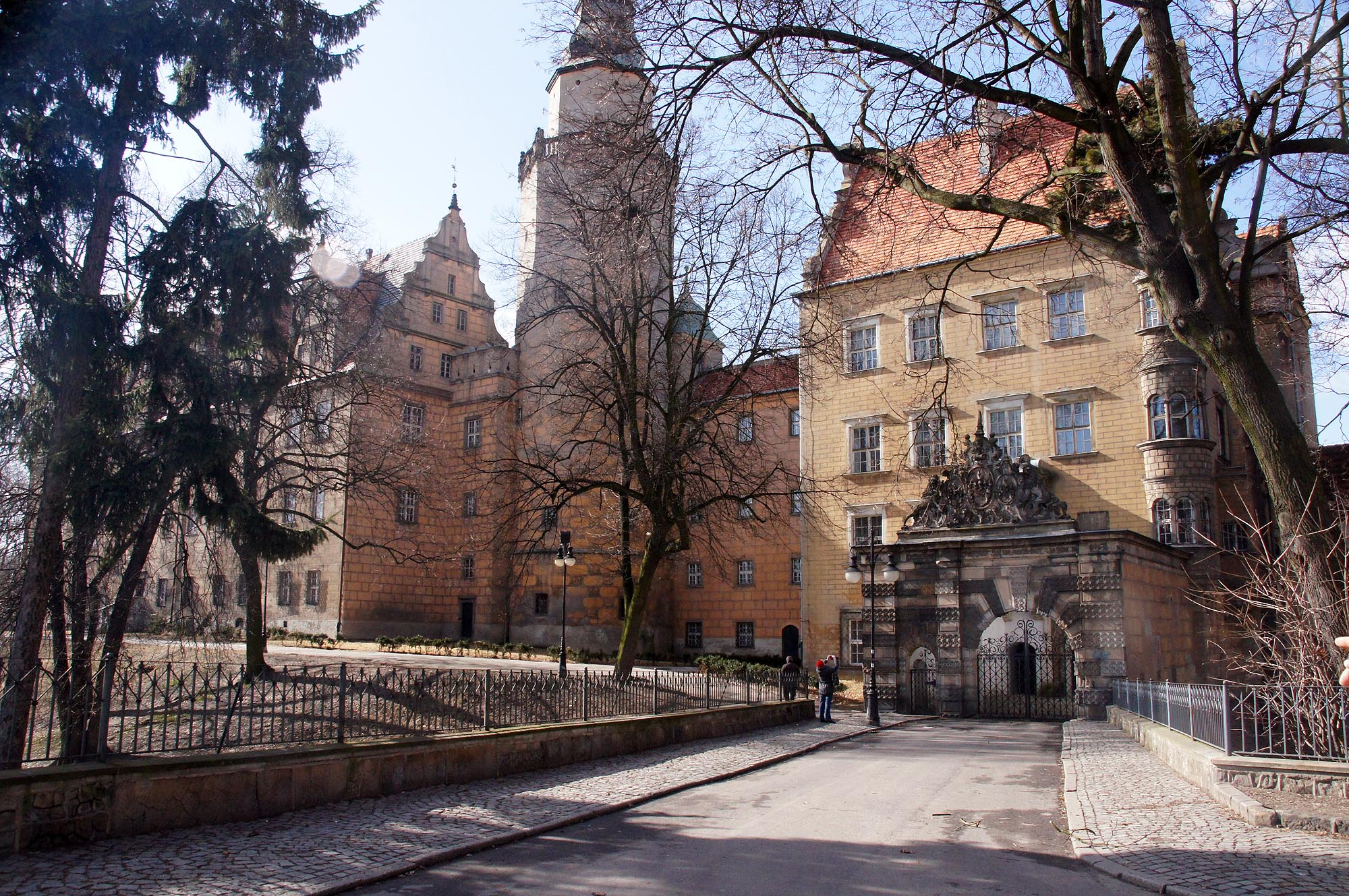
Oels Castle, Silesia

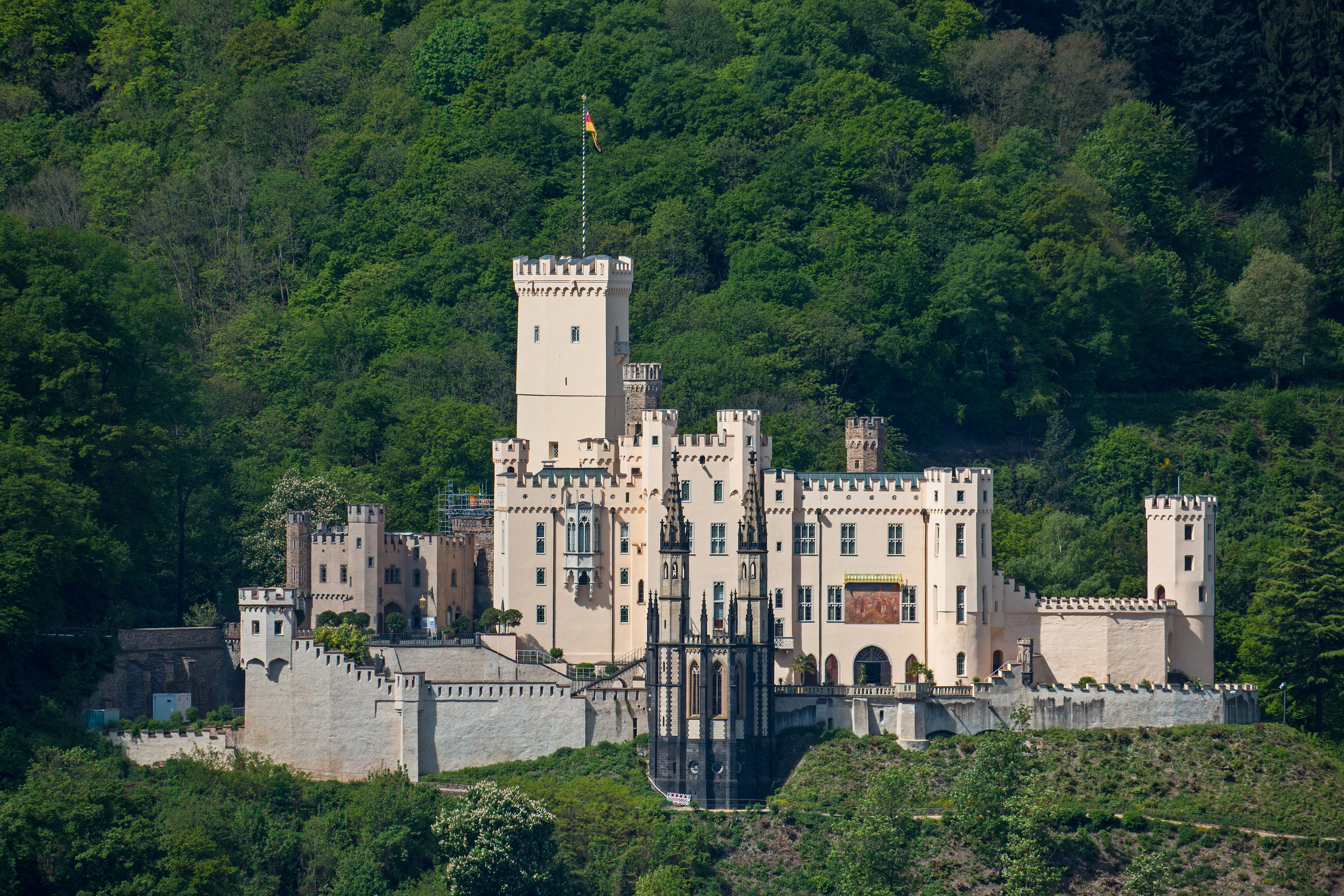
Stolzenfels Castle, Koblenz

=== Palaces of the Franconian branches ===
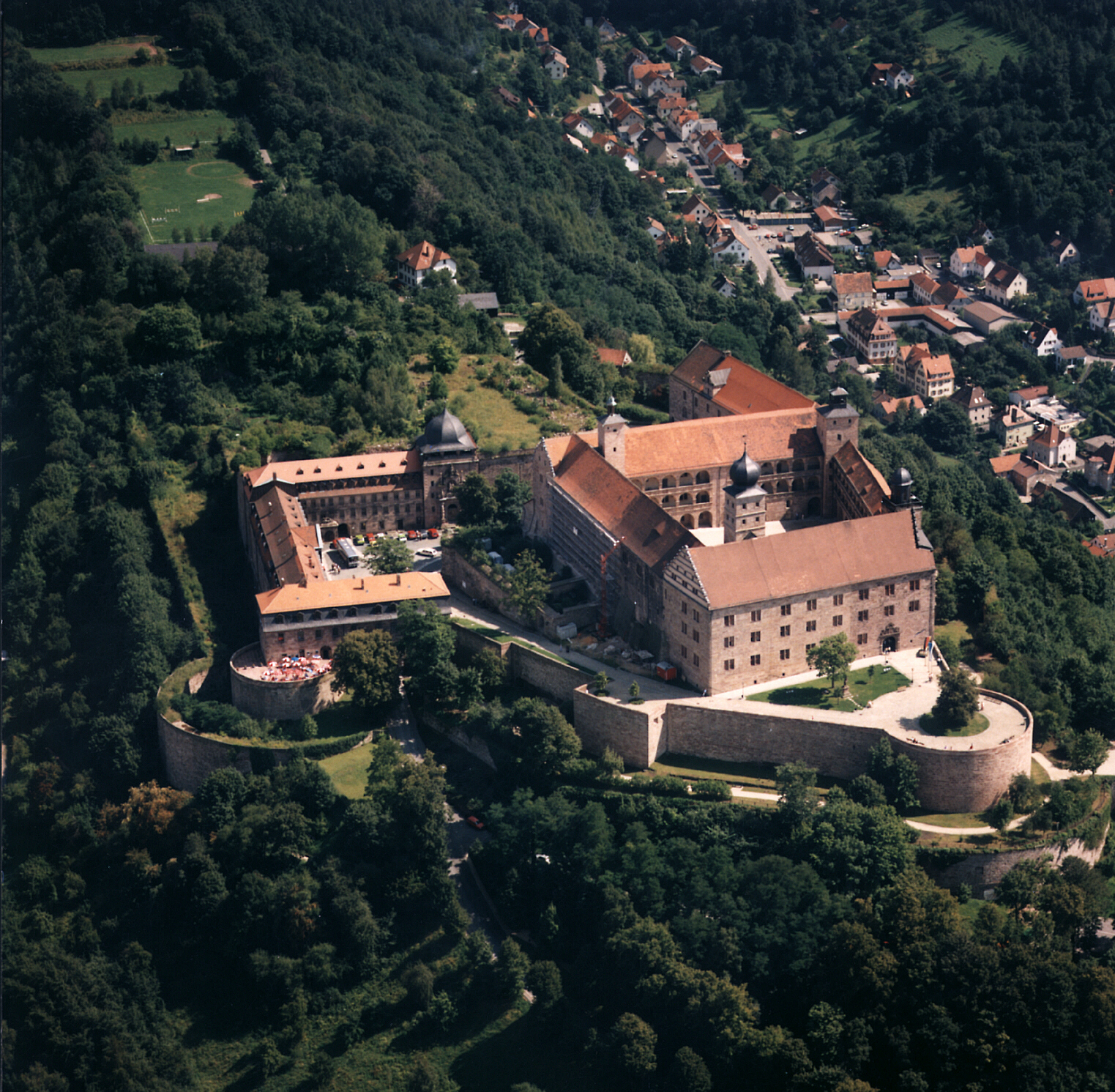
Plassenburg Castle at Kulmbach

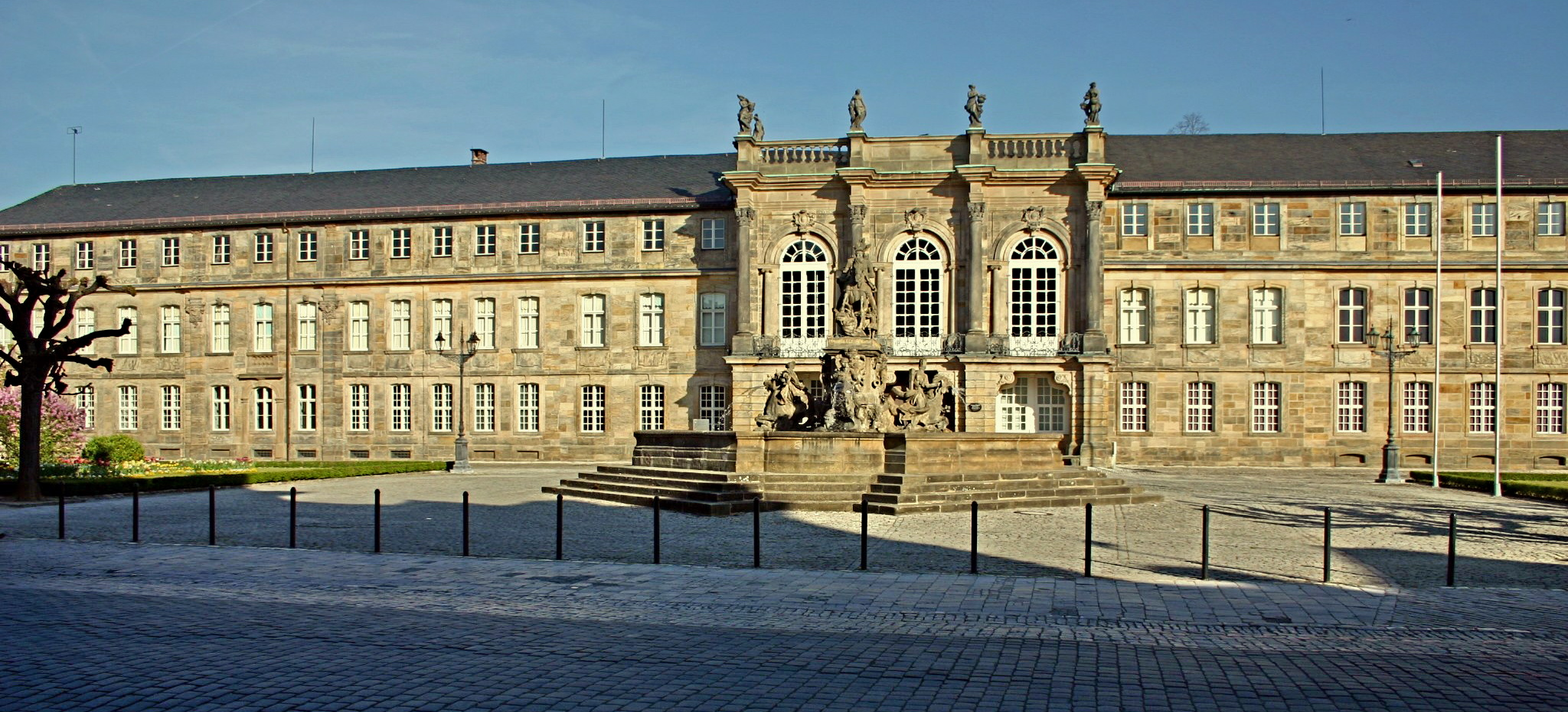
The New Castle at Bayreuth

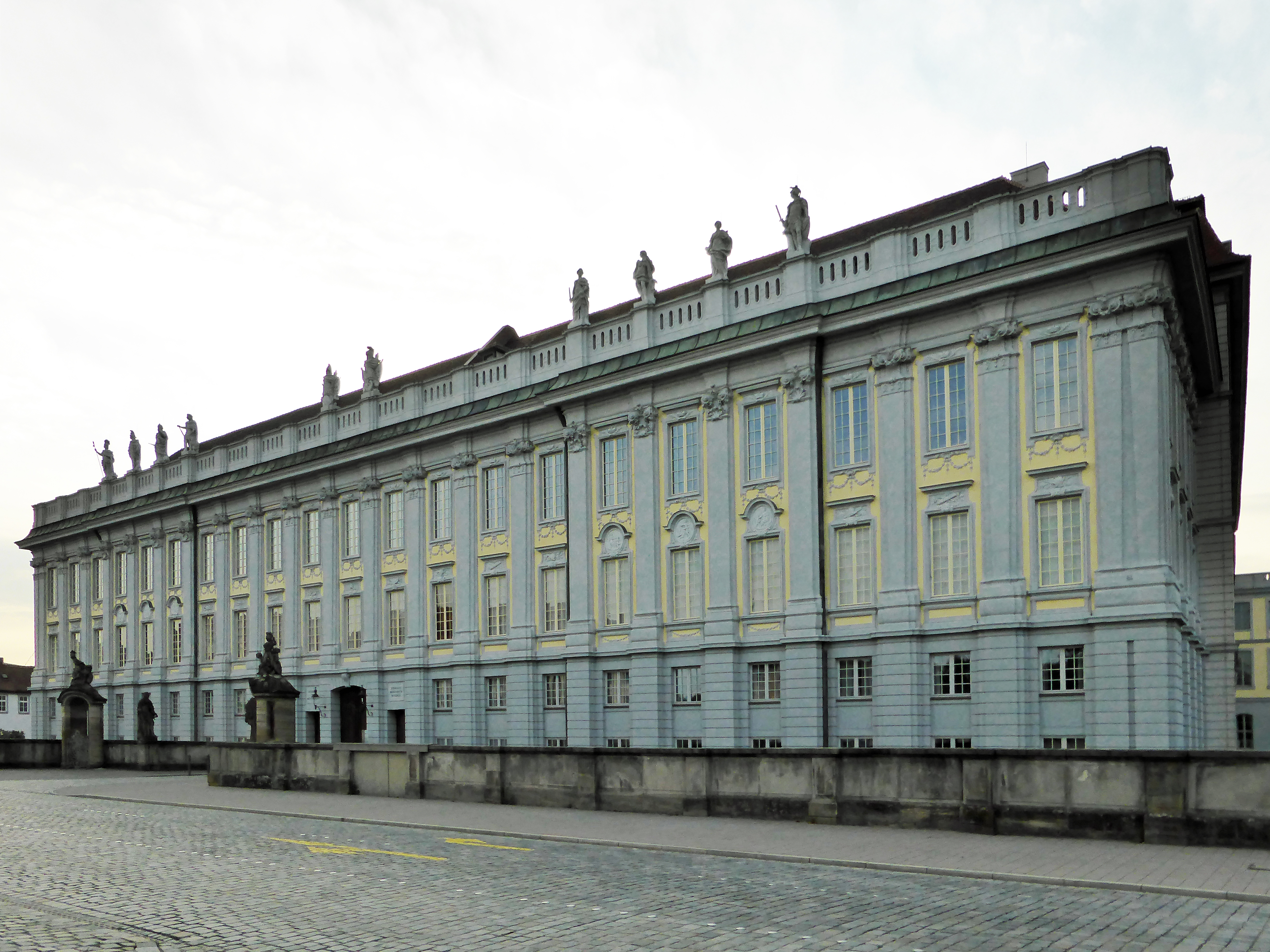
Residenz Ansbach

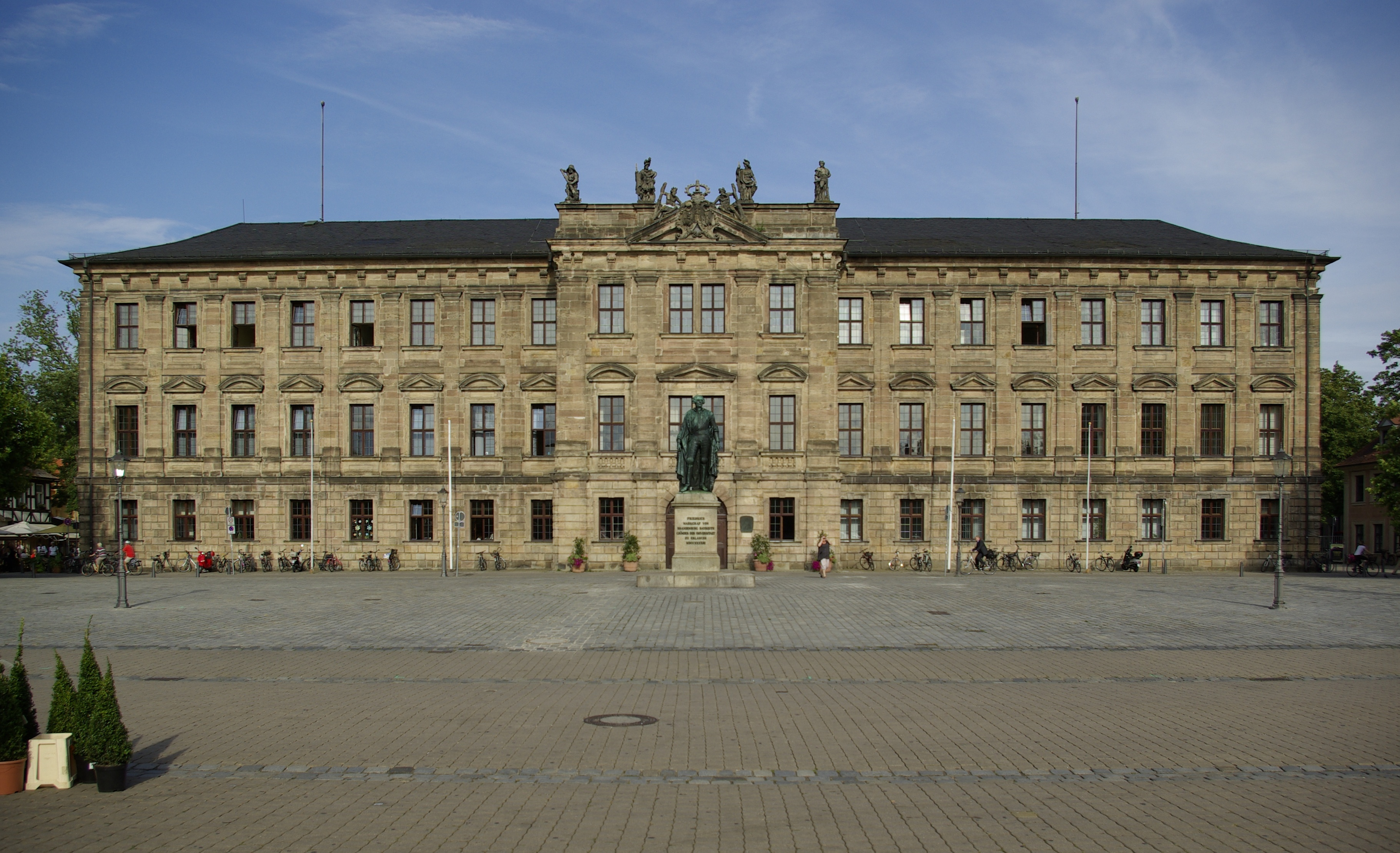
Erlangen Castle

=== Palaces of the Swabian Hohenzollerns ===
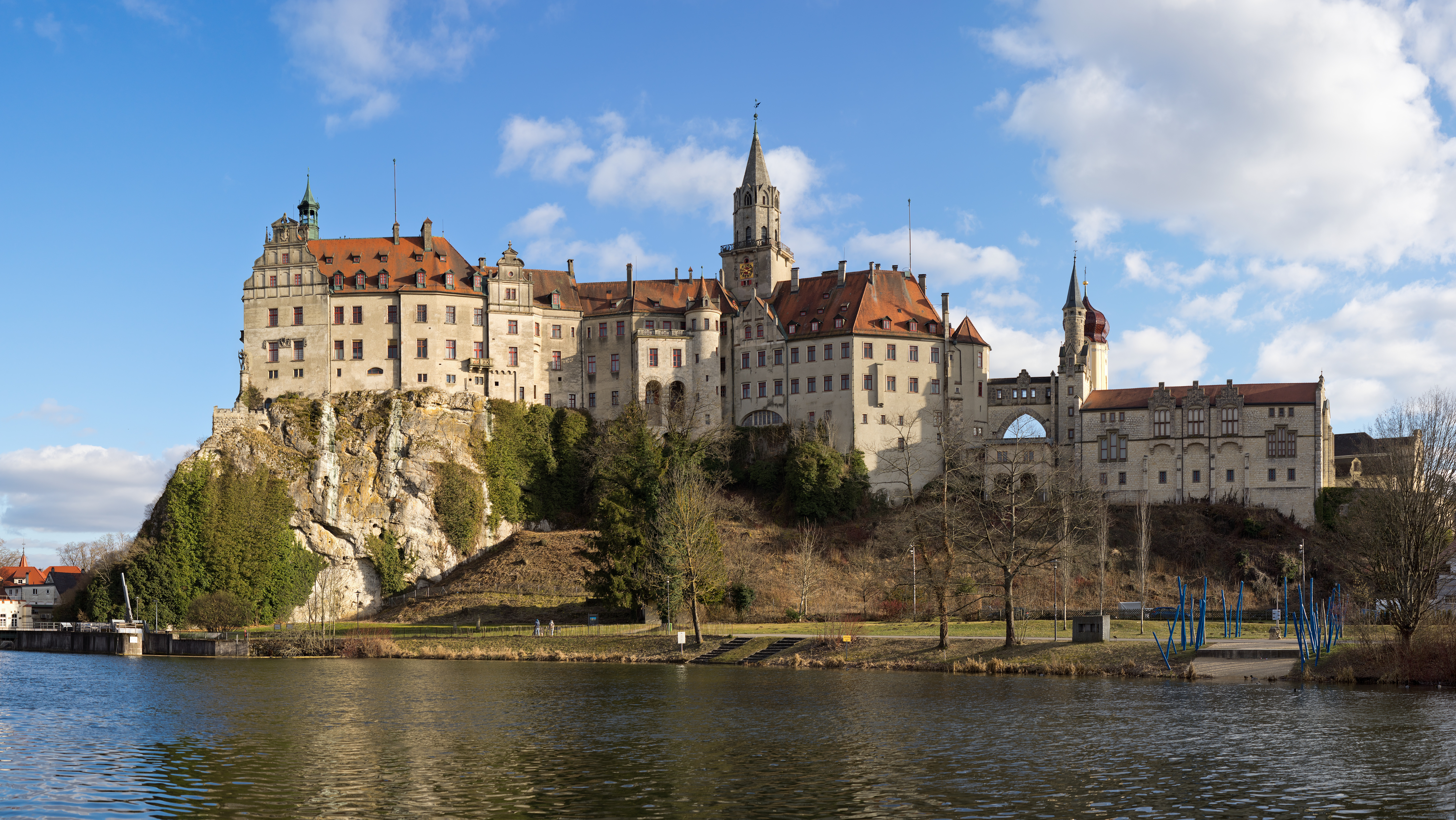
Sigmaringen Castle, Sigmaringen

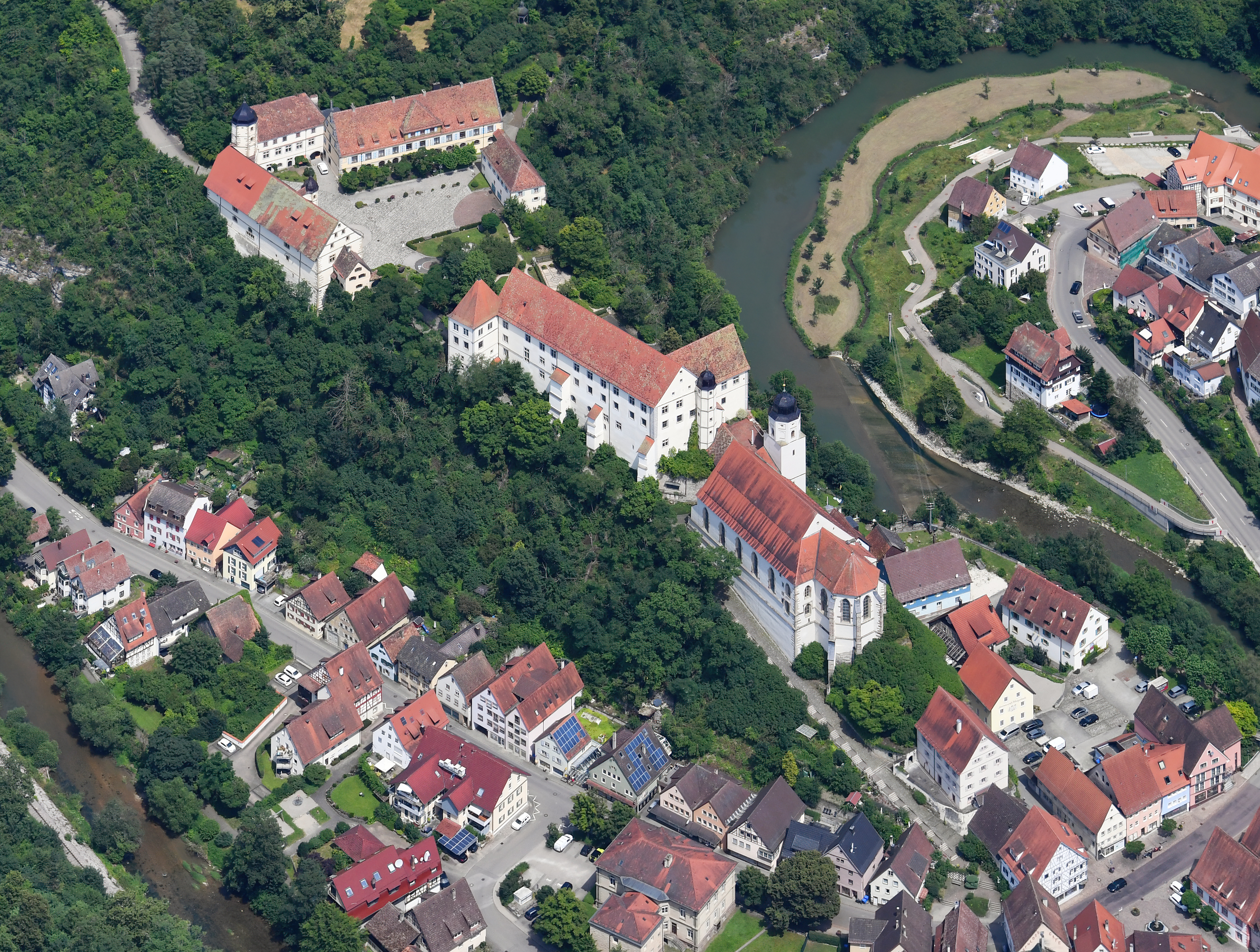
Haigerloch Castle, Haigerloch

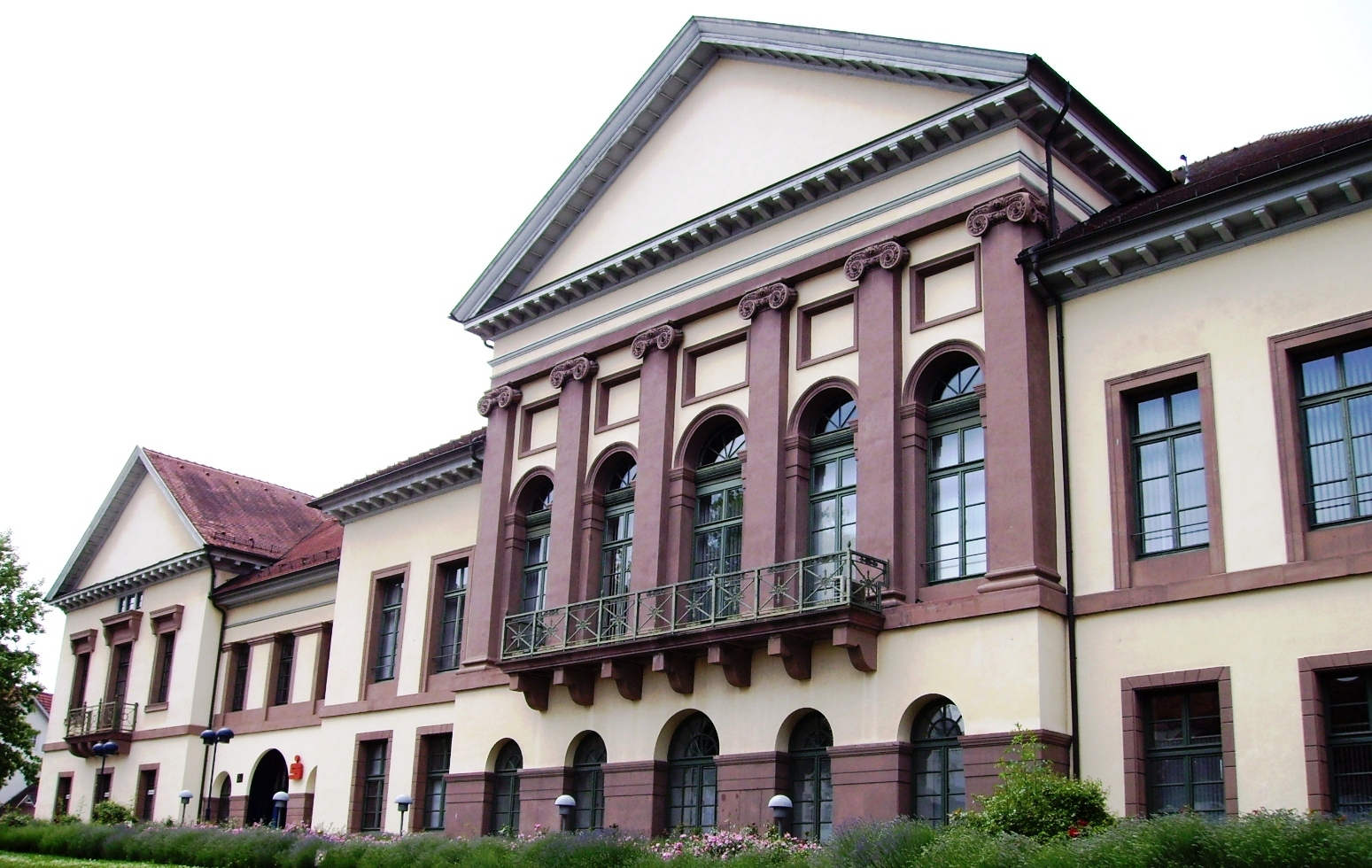
The New Castle at Hechingen

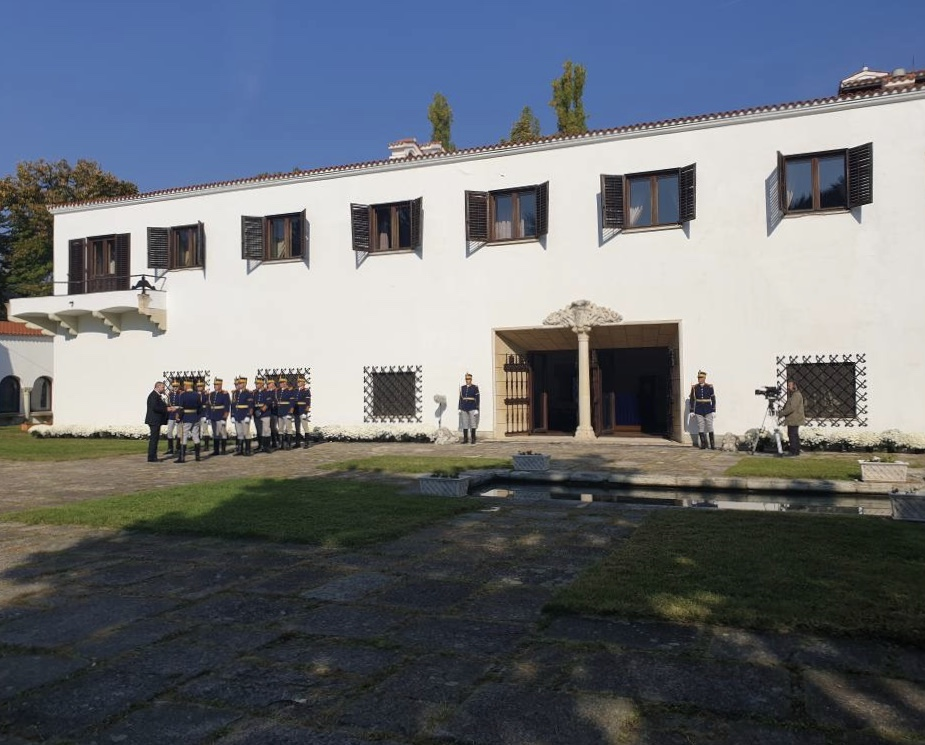
Elisabeta Palace, Bucharest

Royal Palace, Bucharest

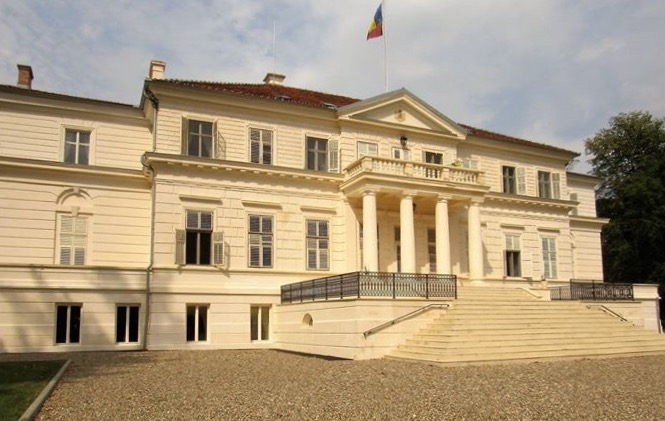
Săvârșin Castle, Săvârșin

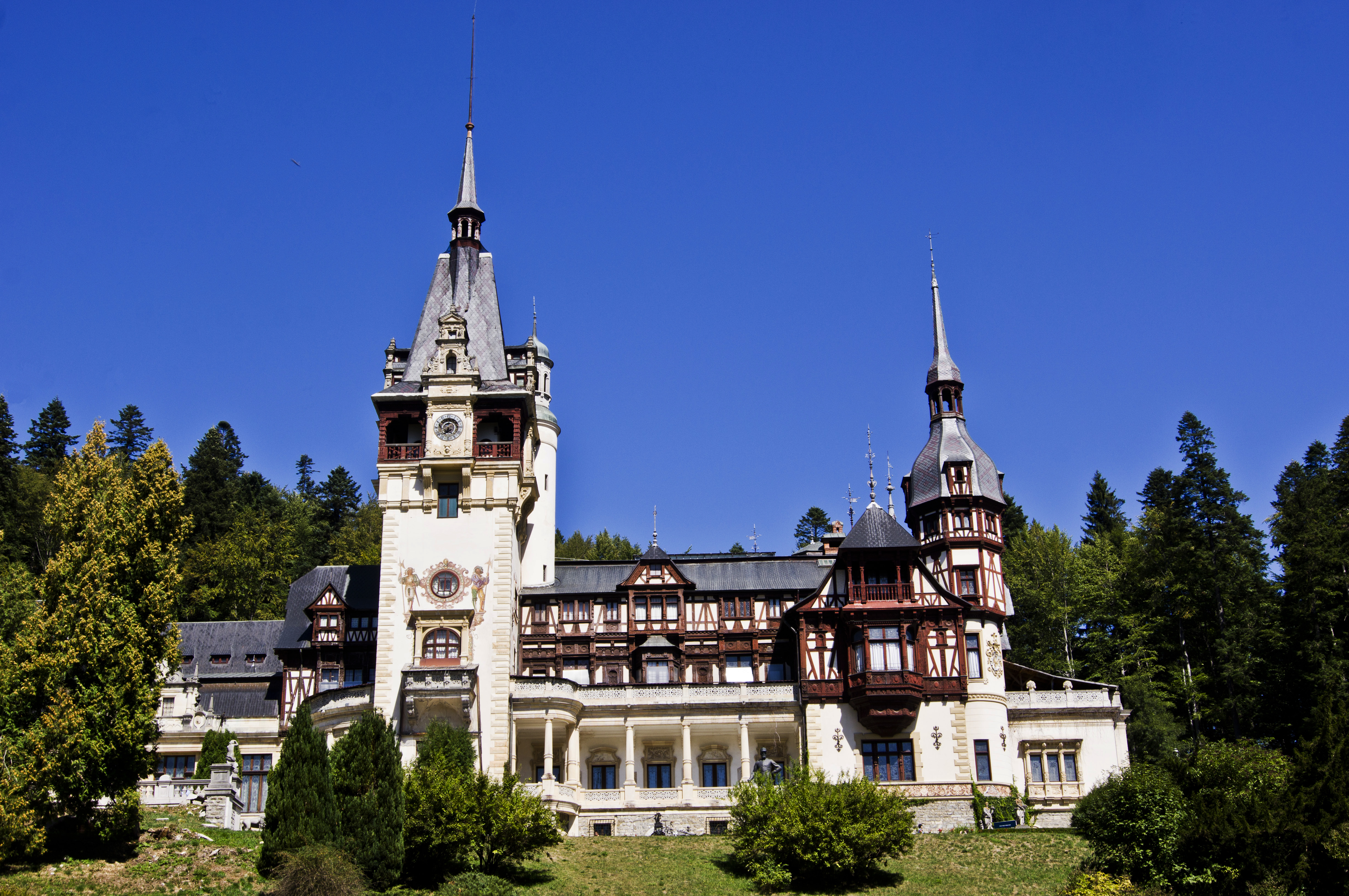
Peleș Castle, Sinaia

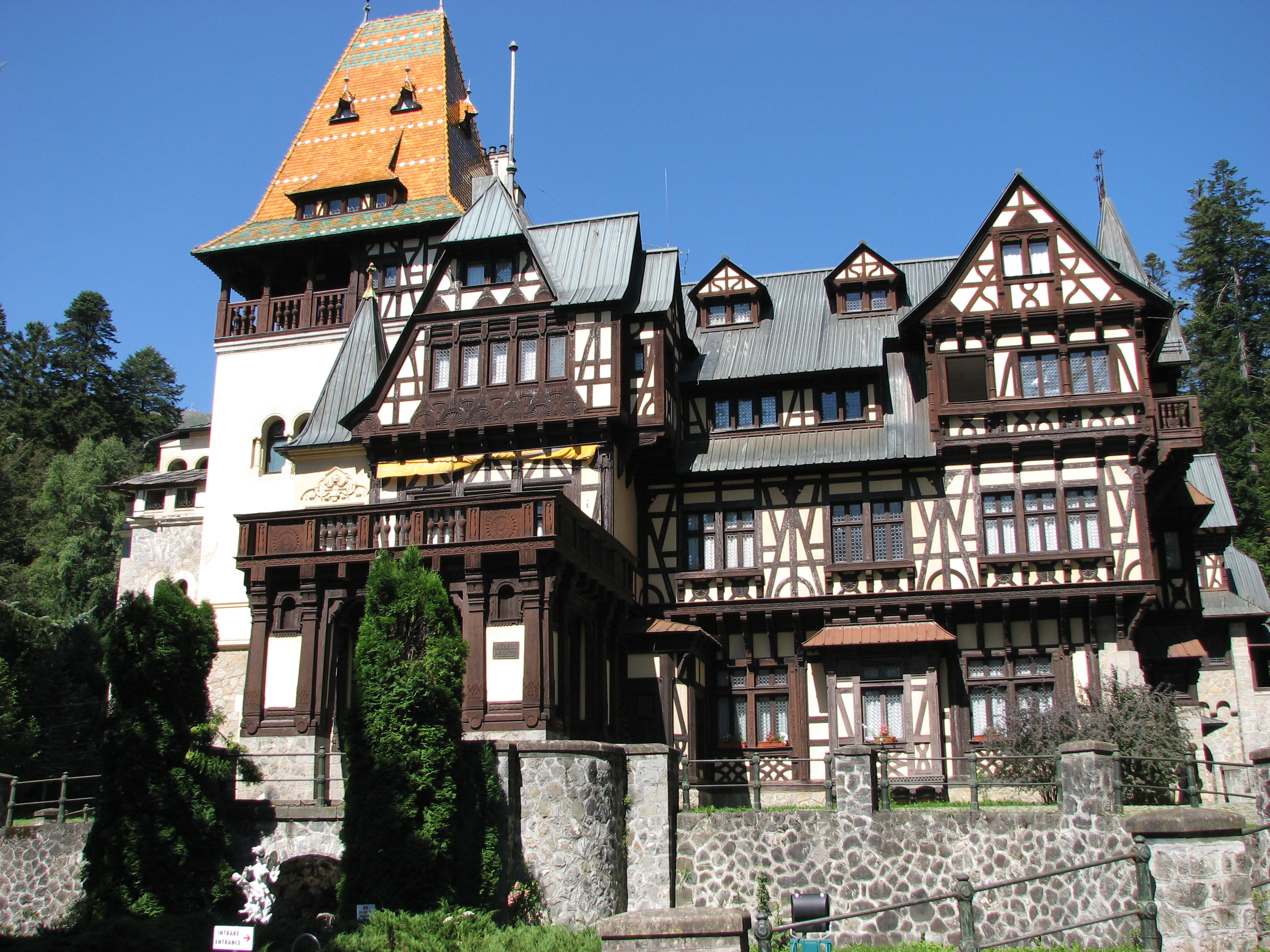
Pelișor Castle, Sinaia

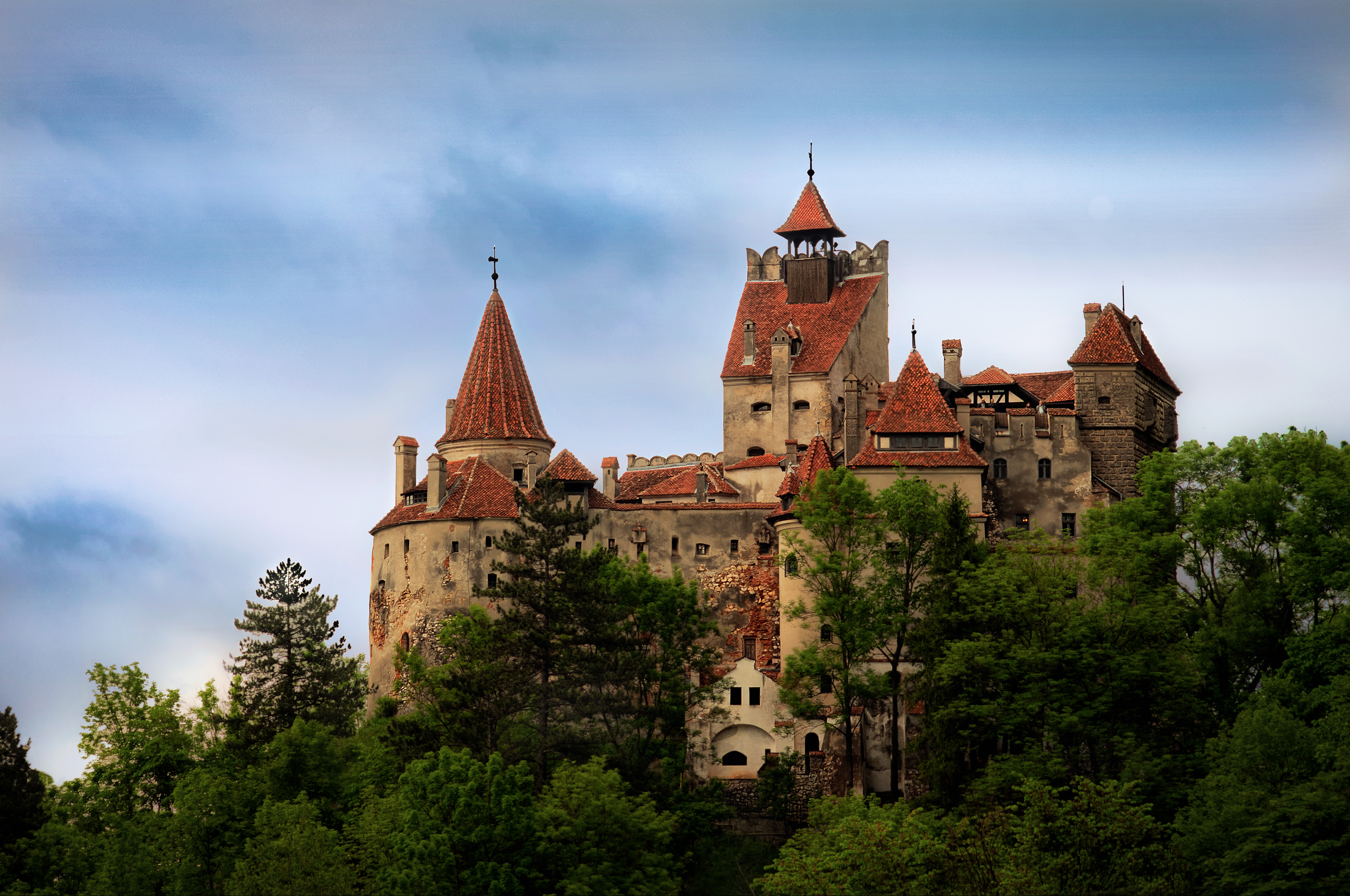
Bran Castle, Bran

== Property claims ==
In 2014, Prince Georg Friedrich, Head of the House of Hohenzollern filed a claim on the property of the Huis Doorn, the manor that Kaiser Wilhelm II spent his last time after being abdicated, but this was rejected by Dutch Minister Jet Bussemaker.

In mid-2019, it was revealed that Prince Georg Friedrich had filed claims for permanent right of residency for his family in Cecilienhof, or one of two other Hohenzollern palaces in Potsdam, as well as return of the family library, 266 paintings, an imperial crown and sceptre, and the letters of Empress Augusta Victoria.

Central to the argument was that Monbijou Palace, which had been permanently given to the family following the fall of the Kaiser, was demolished by the East German government in 1959. Lawyers for the German state argued that the involvement of members of the family in National Socialism had voided any such rights.

In June 2019, a claim made by Prince Georg Friedrich that Rheinfels Castle be returned to the Hohenzollern family was dismissed by a court. In 1924, the ruined Castle had been given by the state of Rhineland-Palatinate to the town of St Goar, under the provision it was not sold. In 1998, the town leased the ruins to a nearby hotel. His case made the claim that this constituted a breach of the bequest.

== Coats of arms ==
Quartered coat of arms of the Hohenzollerns

Arms of the Hohenzollerns with crest

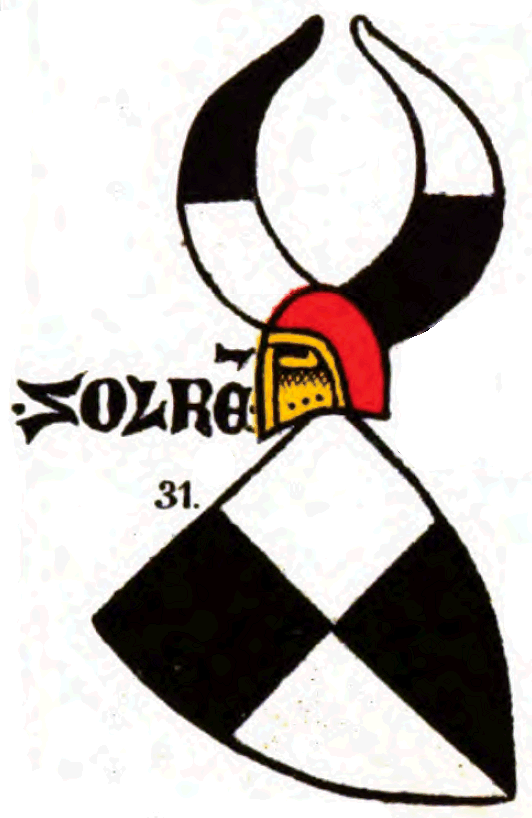
Counts of Zollern (1340)

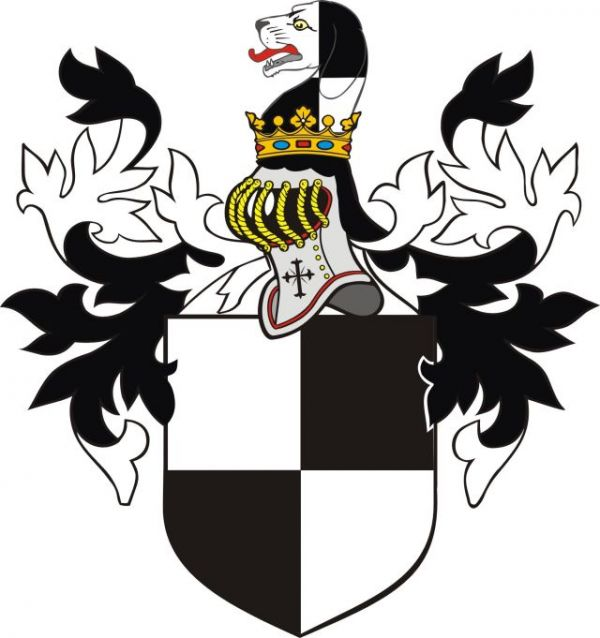
Achievement of Counts of Zollern

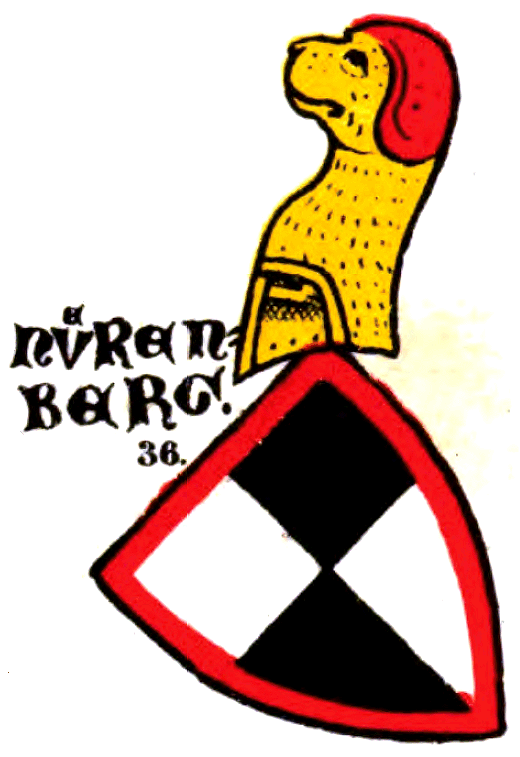
Burgraves of Nuremberg (1340)

Burgraves of Nuremberg

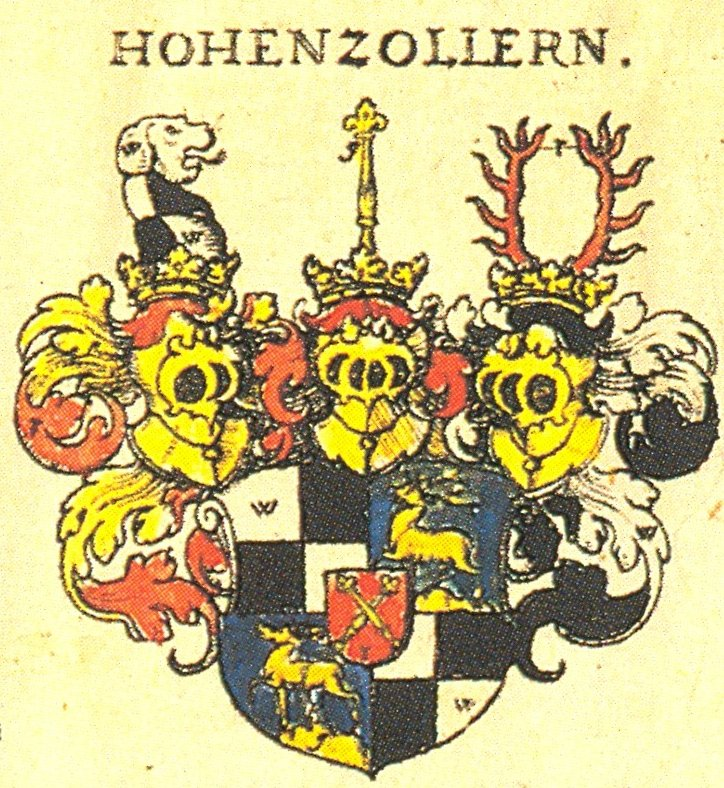
The princely Swabian branch (1605)

Margraves of Brandenburg (1465)

Arms of the Duke of Prussia

Arms of the King of Prussia

Achievement of the King of Prussia

Coat of Arms of the German Emperor (1871–1918)

The greater coat of arms as German Emperor (1871–1918)

The greater coat of arms of the King of Romania (1922–1947)

For younger sons, to the extent that they did difference arms, the Hohenzollerns tended to use bordures of different colors or combinations of:

Coat of Arms of the Crown Prince of German Empire, a bordure gules on the arms of the German Emperor.

Coat of Arms of Prince Henry of Prussia with the Order of the Golden Fleece.

== Members of the family after abdication ==
=== Royal Brandenburg-Prussian branch ===
- Prince Franz Wilhelm of Prussia (1943–)
- Prince Frederick of Prussia (1911–1966)
- Georg Friedrich, Prince of Prussia (1976–)
- Prince Hubertus of Prussia (1909–1950)
- Princess Kira of Prussia (1943–2004)
- Louis Ferdinand, Prince of Prussia (1907–1994)
- Prince Louis Ferdinand of Prussia (1944–1977)
- Prince Michael of Prussia (1940–2014)
- Prince Oskar of Prussia (1959–)
- Wilhelm, Prince of Prussia (1882–1951)
- Prince Wilhelm of Prussia (1906–1940)
- Prince Wilhelm-Karl of Prussia (1922–2007)
- Prince Wilhelm-Karl of Prussia (b. 1955) (2007–present)

=== Princely Swabian branch ===
- Princess Augusta Victoria of Hohenzollern (1890–1966)
- Prince Ferfried of Hohenzollern (1943–2022)
- Frederick, Prince of Hohenzollern (1891–1965)
- Friedrich Wilhelm, Prince of Hohenzollern (1924–2010)
- Prince Johann Georg of Hohenzollern (1932–2016)
- Karl Friedrich, Prince of Hohenzollern (1952–)

== See also ==
- Coat of arms of Prussia
- Family tree of the German monarchs
- House Order of Hohenzollern
- Iron Cross
- Monarchism in Romania and Nihil sine Deo
- Order of the Black Eagle and Suum cuique
- Order of the Crown (Prussia) and Gott mit uns
- Order of the Red Eagle
- Prussian Army
- Peter Gumpel - Jesuit priest who abandoned the Hohenzollern name
- Wilhelm-Orden

— Royal house — House of Hohenzollern Founding year: 12th century
German unification	Ruling House of Germany; 18 January 1871 – 9 November 1918	Vacant German monarchies abolished
Prussia established	Ruling House of Prussia; 1525 – 9 November 1918	Vacant German monarchies abolished
Romanian unification	Ruling House of Romania; 26 March 1881 – 30 December 1947	Vacant Romanian monarchy abolished
