= Karl von Hohenzollern =

Karl von Hohenzollern or Charles of Hohenzollern may refer to:

- Karl I, Count of Hohenzollern (1516–1576), imperial chamberlain and president of the Imperial Court Council of the Holy Roman Empire
- Charles II, Count of Hohenzollern-Sigmaringen (1547–1606)
- Karl, Count of Hohenzollern-Haigerloch (1588–1634)
- Karl Friedrich, Prince of Hohenzollern-Sigmaringen (1724–1785)
- Karl von Hohenzollern-Hechingen (1732–1803), Prince-Bishop of Warmia and Bishop of Chełmno
- Karl, Prince of Hohenzollern-Sigmaringen (1785–1853)
- Karl Anton, Prince of Hohenzollern (1811–1885), Prussian prime minister
- Prince Karl Anton of Hohenzollern (1868–1919), Prussian general
- Karl Friedrich von Hohenzollern (born 1952), German entrepreneur and head of the House of Hohenzollern-Sigmaringen

== See also ==
- Karl Anton von Hohenzollern (disambiguation)
- Carol of Romania (disambiguation)
