= Hurm =

Hurm may refer to:

== People ==
- Gerd Hurm (born 1958), German professor of American studies
- Karl Hurm (1930–2019), German painter

== Places ==
- Hürm, Austria
