= Johann Christoph, Count of Hohenzollern-Haigerloch =

Soldier serving the Holy Roman Empire and Count of Hohenzollern-Haigerloch (died 1620)

- Born: 1586; Haigerloch
- Died: 1620 (aged 33–34); Haigerloch
- Noble family: House of Hohenzollern
- Spouse: Marie of Hohenzollern-Sigmaringen
- Father: Christoph, Count of Hohenzollern-Haigerloch
- Mother: Katharina of Welsperg

Johann Christoph, Count of Hohenzollern-Haigerloch (1586 in Haigerloch – 1620 in Haigerloch) was the second Count of Hohenzollern-Haigerloch.

== Life ==
Johann Christoph was the eldest son of Count Christoph of Hohenzollern-Haigerloch, from his marriage to Katharina (d. after 1608), daughter of Christoph, Baron of Welsperg. Johann Christoph was still a minor when he inherited the County, and his uncles Eitel Friedrich IV of Hohenzollern-Hechingen and Karl II of Hohenzollern-Sigmaringen took up the regency and guardianship.

He served in the imperial army and lived mostly in Vienna. In 1608 in Sigmaringen, he married his cousin Marie (1592–1658), a daughter of his erstwhile guardian Count Karl II of Hohenzollern-Sigmaringen. This marriage remained childless. In 1612, he acquired Haag-Schlössle Castle in Haigerloch, where his widow would live after his death.

His father had started the construction of the castle church. During Johann Christoph's reign, it was completed. The church was consecrated in 1609.

When the Thirty Years' War broke out in 1618, Johann Christoph was selected as commander of Hohenzollern Castle.

Johann Christoph died in 1620. Since he had not children, he was succeeded by his younger brother Karl, Count of Hohenzollern-Haigerloch.

== Footnotes ==
Johann Christoph, Count of Hohenzollern-Haigerloch House of Hohenzollern Born: 1586 Died: 1620
Preceded by Christoph	Count of Hohenzollern-Haigerloch; 1592-1623	Succeeded by Karl
