= Karl, Count of Hohenzollern-Haigerloch =

Count of Hohenzollern-Haigerloch

- Born: 1588; Haigerloch
- Died: 9 March 1634; Überlingen
- Noble family: House of Hohenzollern
- Spouse: Rosamunde of Ortenburg
- Father: Christoph, Count of Hohenzollern-Haigerloch
- Mother: Katharina of Welsperg

Karl, Count of Hohenzollern-Haigerloch (1588 in Haigerloch – 9 March 1634 in Überlingen) was the third Count of Hohenzollern-Haigerloch.

== Life ==
Karl was the second son of Count Christoph of Hohenzollern-Haigerloch from his marriage to Katharina (d. after 1608), the daughter of Baron Christoph of Welsperg. After his father's early death, he was raised by his uncles Eitel Friedrich IV of Hohenzollern-Hechingen and Karl II of Hohenzollern-Sigmaringen. After completing his education, he initially pursued a military career.

in 1620, Karl succeeded his brother Johann Christoph as Count of Hohenzollern-Haigerloch. He married on 25 March 1618 in Haigerloch to Countess Rosamunde of Ortenburg (d. 1636). This marriage remained childless.

In January 1633, at the height of the Thirty Years' War, the Swedish army approached Haigerloch and Karl fled with an entourage of 21 people to Hohenzollern Castle. The Swedish army soon occupied Hohenzollern Castle. Count Karl was granted a free retreat and he went to the imperial army in Überlingen, where he tried unsuccessfully to talk them into helping him recapture his castle.

He died on 9 March 1634, in the inn zur Krone in Überlingen. As he died without an heir, Hohenzollern-Haigerloch fell to Prince Johann of Hohenzollern-Sigmaringen under the terms of the 1575 inheritance treaty.

Karl, Count of Hohenzollern-Haigerloch House of Hohenzollern Born: 1588 Died: 9 March 1634
Preceded by Johann Christoph	Count of Hohenzollern-Haigerloch; 1623–1634	Succeeded by Johann as Prince of Hohenzollern-Sigmaringen
