= Christoph, Count of Hohenzollern-Haigerloch =

16th Century Count of Hohenzollern-Haigerloch

- Born: 20 March 1552; Haigerloch
- Died: 21 April 1592 (aged 40); Haigerloch
- Noble family: House of Hohenzollern
- Spouse: Catherine of Welsperg
- Father: Karl I, Count of Hohenzollern
- Mother: Anna of Baden-Durlach

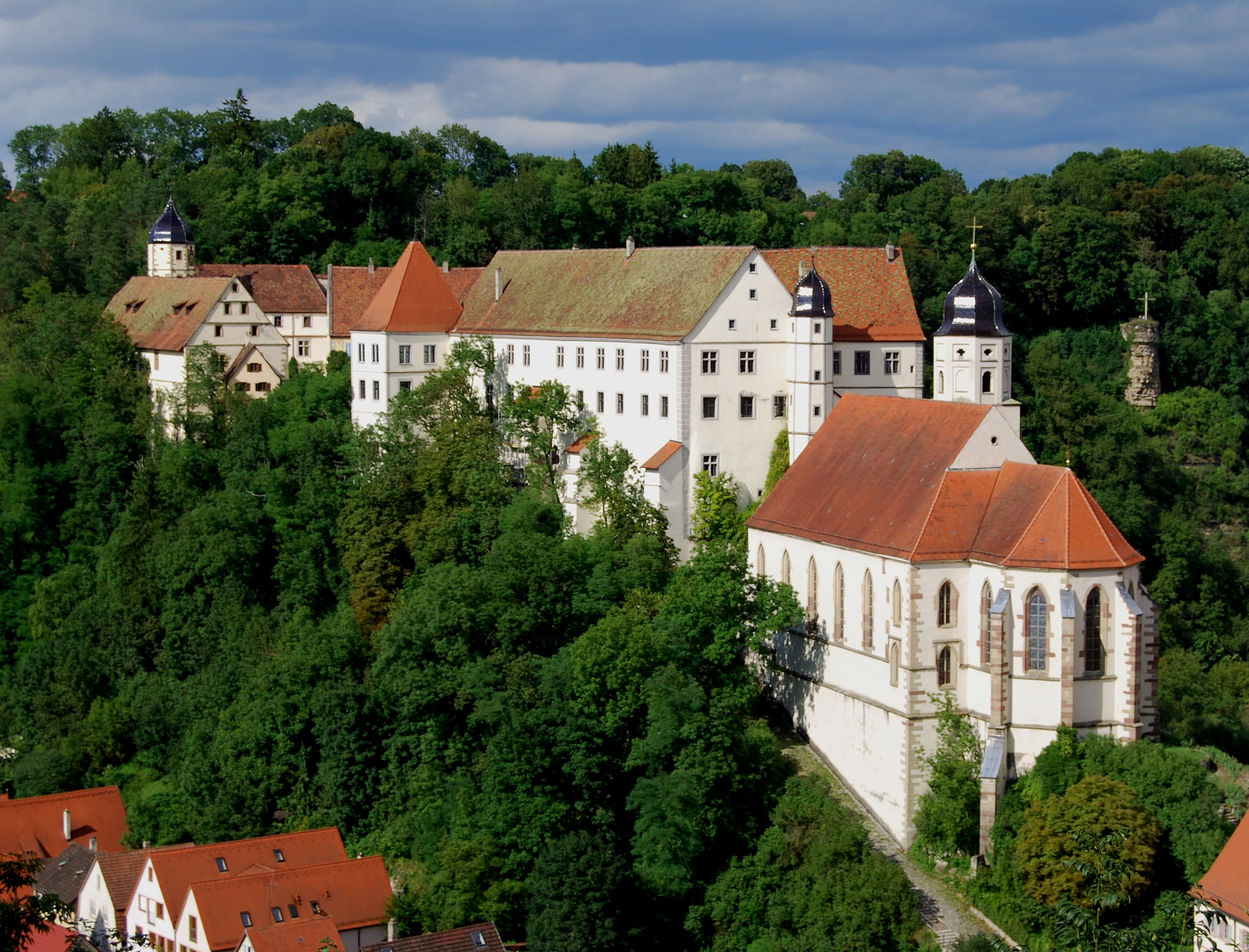
Castle church and Haigerloch Castle

Count Christoph of Hohenzollern-Haigerloch (20 March 1552 in Haigerloch – 21 April 1592, Haigerloch) was the first Count of Hohenzollern-Haigerloch.

== Life ==
Christoph was the third surviving son of Count Karl I of Hohenzollern (1516–1576) from his marriage to Anna (1512–1579), daughter of Ernst, Margrave of Baden-Durlach. Christoph studied law together with his brother Karl II (1547–1606) in Freiburg im Breisgau and Bourges.

When Karl I died in 1576, the County of Hohenzollern was divided into Hohenzollern-Hechingen, Hohenzollern-Sigmaringen and Hohenzollern-Haigerloch. Christoph, the youngest son, received the Lordship of Haigerloch, which had been acquired in 1497. It included Enisheim Castle and the towns of Imnau and Stetten. His eldest brother Eitel Friedrich IV received Hechingen, his other brother Karl II received Sigmaringen. Christoph's part had 10000 inhabitants at the time and was substantially smaller than the parts of his brothers. Christoph founded the elder Haigerloch line, which died out with his younger son.

Christoph cared intensely about the administration of his country. He soon began an extensive reconstruction of his Haigerloch Castle. He felt that the medieval castle was not representative for a ruler of his era. However, he died before the work could be completed. Christoph and his wife together founded the Holy Trinity Church in Haigerloch.

When Count Christoph Stanislaus of Nellenburg died in 1591, Christoph inherited the Lordship of Wehrstein with the castle of the same name and the village of Dettensee. Christoph inherited because Christoph Stanislaus's brother had been married to a Countess Helene Eleonore of Hohenzollern (d. 1565). The other claimant was Baroness Anna Maria of Wolfstein-Obersulzburg (b. 1546), the only daughter of Adam von Wolfstein, Freiherr zu Obersulzburg (d. 1547) by his second wife, Maria Salome von Tengen und Nellenburg, who had had a failed marriage with a citizen of Bregenz named Paul Fetz. Christoph and his brothers discredited her by claiming she had been a prostitute.

== Marriage and issue ==
In 1577, in Sigmaringen, Christoph married Baroness Catherine von Welsperg and Primör (died after 1608), a daughter of Baron Christoph of Welsperg und Primör (1528-1580) and his wife, Baroness Eva Dorothea Lucia von Firmian (1535-1584). Christoph and Catherine had the following children:

- Johann Christoph (1586–1620), Count of Hohenzollern-Haigerloch

married in 1608 to Countess Marie Elisabeth of Hohenzollern-Sigmaringen (1592-1659)

- Karl (1588–1634), Count of Hohenzollern-Haigerloch

married in 1618 to Countess Rosamunde of Ortenburg (d. 1636)

- Marie Salome Kunigunde (1578–1647), a nun in the Inzigkofen Abbey
- Anna Dorothea († 1647), Prioress at Inzigkofen Abbey
- Marie Sidonia, a nun at Söflingen Abbey
- Jakobe (died after 1607)

Christoph, Count of Hohenzollern-Haigerloch House of Hohenzollern Born: 20 March 1552 Died: 21 April 1592
Preceded by Karl I as Count of Hohenzollern	Count of Hohenzollern-Haigerloch; 1576-1592	Succeeded by Johann Christoph
