= Franz Christoph Anton, Count of Hohenzollern-Sigmaringen =

German count (1699-1767)

- Born: 16 January 1699; Haigerloch
- Died: 23 November 1767 (aged 68); Cologne
- Buried: Cologne Cathedral
- Noble family: House of Hohenzollern
- Father: Franz Anton, Count of Hohenzollern-Haigerloch
- Mother: Anna Maria Eusebia of Königsegg-Aulendorf

Franz Christoph Anton, Count of Hohenzollern-Sigmaringen (16 January 1699 in Haigerloch – 23 November 1767 in Cologne) was a member of the House of Hohenzollern. He was canon of several cathedral chapters and also first minister of the Prince-Archbishopric of Cologne under Archbishop Clemens August. From 1750 until his death, he was also the ruling count of Hohenzollern-Haigerloch.

== Life ==
He was the son of Count Franz Anton of Hohenzollern-Haigerloch and his wife Anna Maria Eusebia of Königsegg-Aulendorf. His elder brother Ferdinand Leopold was also at various times canon of several cathedral chapters, first minister of Cologne, and ruling Count of Hohenzollern-Haigerloch.

In 1717, Franz Christoph Anton became canon in Cologne. In 1725, he became cathedral chaplain. From 1726, he was also canon in Strasbourg and Salzburg. Between 1748 and 1750, he was Chorbishop at Cologne and from 1750 to 1763, he was Vice Dean, and also Cathedral Treasurer. In 1763, he succeeded Asseburg as first minister under Prince-Archbishop Clemens August. He also served as Hofmeister, war councillor, governor of the Diocese of Strasbourg and chancellor of the University of Cologne. From 1763, he was provost (religion) of Cologne cathedral.

He died on 23 November 1767 and was buried in the Cologne Cathedral.

Franz Christoph Anton, Count of Hohenzollern-Sigmaringen House of Hohenzollern Born: 16 January 1699 Died: 23 November 1767
Preceded by Ferdinand Leopold	Count of Hohenzollern-Haigerloch; 1750-1767	Succeeded by Joseph Friedrich Ernst as Prince of Hohenzollern-Sigmaringen
