= Franz Anton, Count of Hohenzollern-Haigerloch =

Count of Hohenzollern-Haigerloch and Imperial military commander

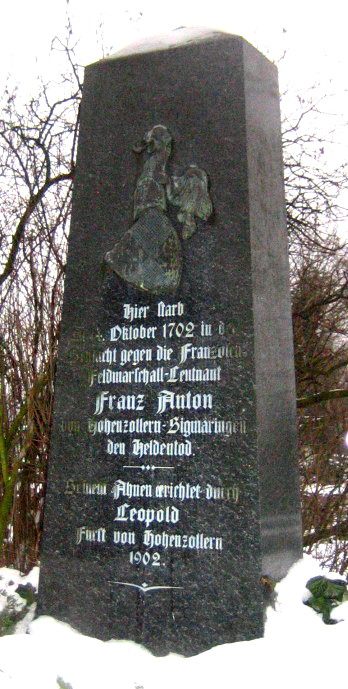
- Memorial plaque at the cemetery in Weil am Rhein: Here Field Marshal-Lieutenant Franz Anton of Hohenzollern-Sigmaringen died a heroic death on 14 October 1702 in the battle against the French — built by Leopold, Prince of Hohenzollern for his ancestor — 1902
- Born: 2 December 1657; Sigmaringen Castle
- Died: 14 October 1702 (aged 44); Friedlingen
- Buried: Weil am Rhein
- Noble family: House of Hohenzollern
- Spouse: Anna Maria Eusebia of Königsegg-Aulendorf
- Father: Meinrad I, Prince of Hohenzollern-Sigmaringen
- Mother: Anna Marie of Törring at Seefeld

Franz Anton, Count of Hohenzollern-Haigerloch (2 December 1657 at Sigmaringen Castle – 14 October 1702 in Friedlingen), was a reigning Count of Hohenzollern-Haigerloch.

== Life ==
Franz Anton was the youngest son of Prince Meinrad I of Hohenzollern-Sigmaringen (1605-1681) from his marriage to Anna Marie (1613-1682), the daughter of Baron Ferdinand of Törring at Seefeld.

He served in the imperial army and reached the rank of Field Marshal-Lieutenant. Under the terms of the family's elevation to the rank of Prince, his eldest brother inherited the principality of Hohenzollern-Sigmaringen and Franz Anton only inherited the County of Hohenzollern-Haigerloch. In 1692, Emperor Leopold I again confirmed that the Princes of Swabina branch of the House of Hohenzollern held the rank of Imperial Princes, he explicitly made an exception for the Haigerloch line.

Franz Anton fell in the Battle of Friedlingen, during the War of the Spanish Succession.

== Marriage and issue ==
Franz Anton married on 5 February 1687 to Anna Maria Eusebia (1670-1716), the daughter of Count Anton Eusebius of Königsegg-Aulendorf. The couple had the following children:

- Ferdinand Leopold Anton (1692-1750), clergy and prime minister of Cologne
- Anna Maria (1694-1732), married in 1714 to Ludwig Xaver Fugger, Count of Kirchberg and Weissenhorn (1688-1746), a descendent of the Fugger Family.
- Maria Franziska (1697-1767), married in 1720 to Count Franz Hugo of Koenigsegg-Rothfels (1698-1772)
- Franz Christoph Anton (1699-1767), clergy and prime minister of Cologne

== See also ==
- House of Hohenzollern

== Footnotes ==
Franz Anton, Count of Hohenzollern-Haigerloch House of Hohenzollern Born: 2 December 1657 Died: 14 October 1702
Preceded by Meinrad I as Prince of Hohenzollern-Sigmaringen	Count of Hohenzollern-Haigerloch; 1681-1702	Succeeded by Ferdinand Leopold Anton
