= Francis Anthony (disambiguation) =

Francis Anthony (1550–1623) was a physician.

Francis or Frank Anthony may also refer to:

- Francis Anthony, Duke of Saxe-Coburg-Saalfeld (1750–1806)
- Francis Anthony, Count of Hohenzollern-Haigerloch (1657–1702)
- Frank Anthony (1908–1993), Anglo-Indian leader
