= Ferdinand Leopold, Count of Hohenzollern-Sigmaringen =

German nobleman; ruling Count of Hohenzollern-Haigerloch

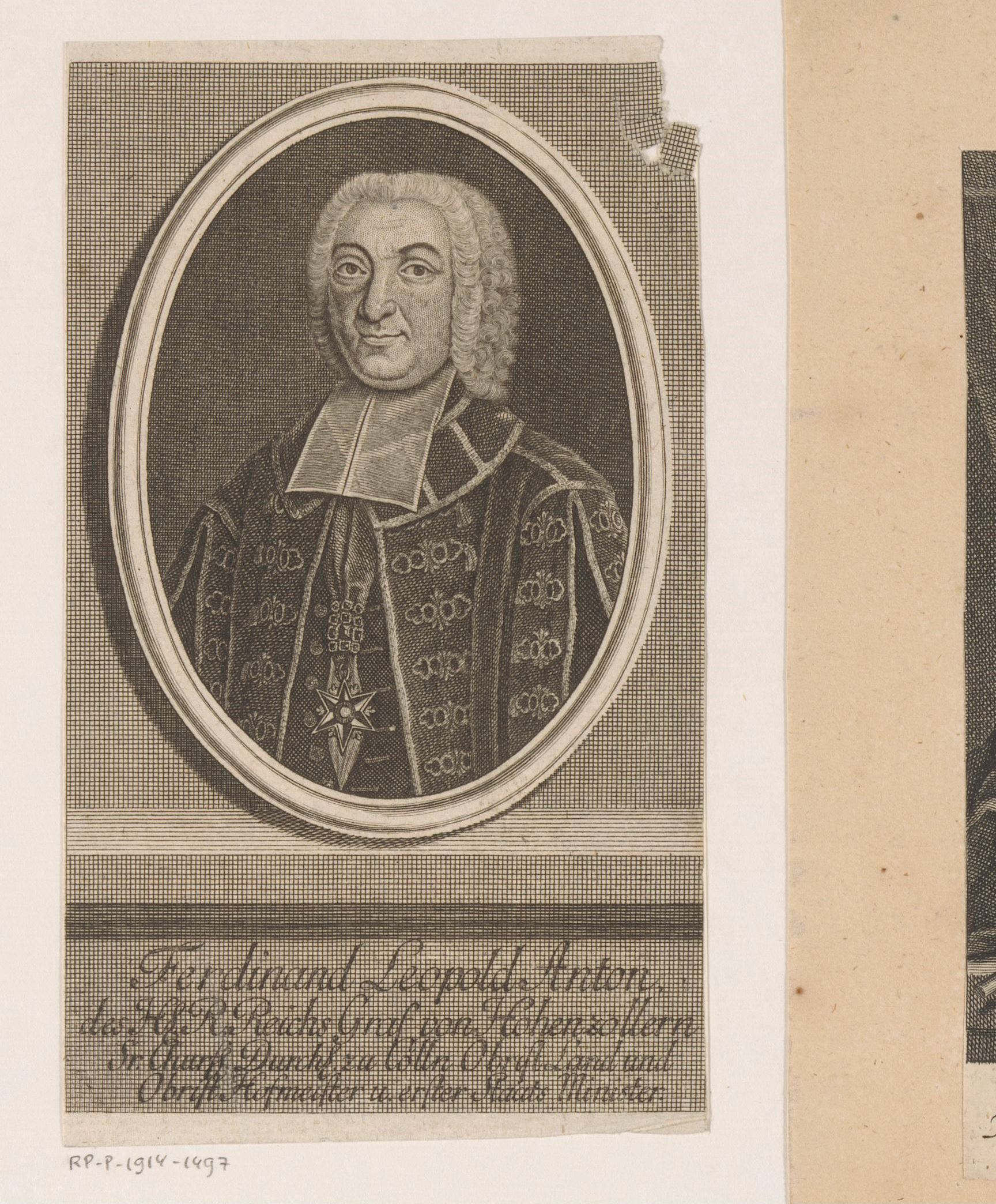
- Born: 4 December 1692; Sigmaringen
- Died: 23 July 1750 (aged 57); Brühl Palace
- Buried: Cologne Cathedral
- Noble family: House of Hohenzollern
- Father: Franz Anton, Count of Hohenzollern-Haigerloch
- Mother: Anna Maria Eusebia of Königsegg-Aulendorf

Anton Ferdinand Leopold, Count of Hohenzollern-Sigmaringen (also known as Count of Hohenzollern-Haigerloch; 4 December 1692 – 23 July 1750) was a German nobleman. He was a various times canon of different cathedral chapters and first minister of the Electorate of Cologne under Elector Clemens August. From 1702 until his death, he was the ruling Count of Hohenzollern-Haigerloch.

== Life ==
He was the son of Count Franz Anton and his wife Anna Maria Eusebia of Königsegg-Aulendorf, and was born in Sigmaringen.

In 1706, he joined the cathedral chapter in Cologne. From 1714 to 1726, he was also canon in Speyer. In 1725, he was appointed canon in Strasbourg. In Cologne, he was chorbishop from 1724 to 1727. In 1727, he became vice dean, and 1731, cathedral dean. In 1733, he succeeded Ferdinand of Plettenberg as prime minister of the Electorate of Cologne. However, he had much less political influence than his predecessor. In 1745, he voted on behalf of Cologne in the election of Emperor Francis I.

He died at Brühl Palace in 1750, and was buried in the Cologne Cathedral. He was unmarried and childless. He was succeeded as Count of Hohenzollern-Haigerloch by his younger brother Franz Christoph Anton.

Ferdinand Leopold, Count of Hohenzollern-Sigmaringen House of Hohenzollern Born: 4 December 1692 Died: 23 July 1750
Preceded by Franz Anton	Count of Hohenzollern-Haigerloch; 1702-1750	Succeeded by Franz Christoph Anton
