= Hohenzollern-Sigmaringen =

Former principality in southwest Germany

Coordinates: 48°05′17″N 9°13′00″E

Principality of Hohenzollern-Sigmaringen Fürstentum Hohenzollern-Sigmaringen (German)
- 1576–1850
- Flag Coat of arms
- Motto: Nihil Sine Deo (Latin) Nothing without God
- Hohenzollern-Sigmaringen (including Haigerloch from 1767 onwards) in 1848
- Status: State of the Holy Roman Empire (1576–1806); State of the Confederation of the Rhine (1806–1813); State of the German Confederation (1815–1850)
- Capital: Sigmaringen
- Common languages: German
- Government: Principality
- Prince
  - 1623–1638: Johann (first)
  - 1848–1849: Karl Anton (last)
- Historical era: Early modern period
  - Partition of County of Hohenzollern: 1576
  - Raised to principality: 1629
  - Incorporation into Prussia: 1850

Population
  - 1835: 41,800
Preceded by	Succeeded by
County of Zollern; Hohenzollern-Haigerloch	Province of Hohenzollern
- Today part of: Germany

Hohenzollern-Sigmaringen (German: Fürstentum Hohenzollern-Sigmaringen) was a principality in southwestern Germany. Its rulers belonged to the junior Swabian branch of the House of Hohenzollern. The Swabian Hohenzollerns were elevated to princes in 1623. The small sovereign state with the capital city of Sigmaringen was annexed to the Kingdom of Prussia in 1850 following the abdication of its sovereign in the wake of the revolutions of 1848, then became part of the newly created Province of Hohenzollern.

== History ==
The junior Swabian branch is less well known to history than the senior Franconian line, the latter of which became Burgraves of Nuremberg and later ruled Brandenburg and Prussia, and the German Empire.

The County of Hohenzollern-Sigmaringen was created in 1576, upon the partition of the County of Hohenzollern, a fief of the Holy Roman Empire. When the last count of Hohenzollern, Karl I (1512–1576) died, the territory was divided among his three sons:

- Eitel Friedrich IV of Hohenzollern-Hechingen (1545–1605)
- Charles II of Hohenzollern-Sigmaringen (1547–1606)
- Christoph of Hohenzollern-Haigerloch (1552–1592)

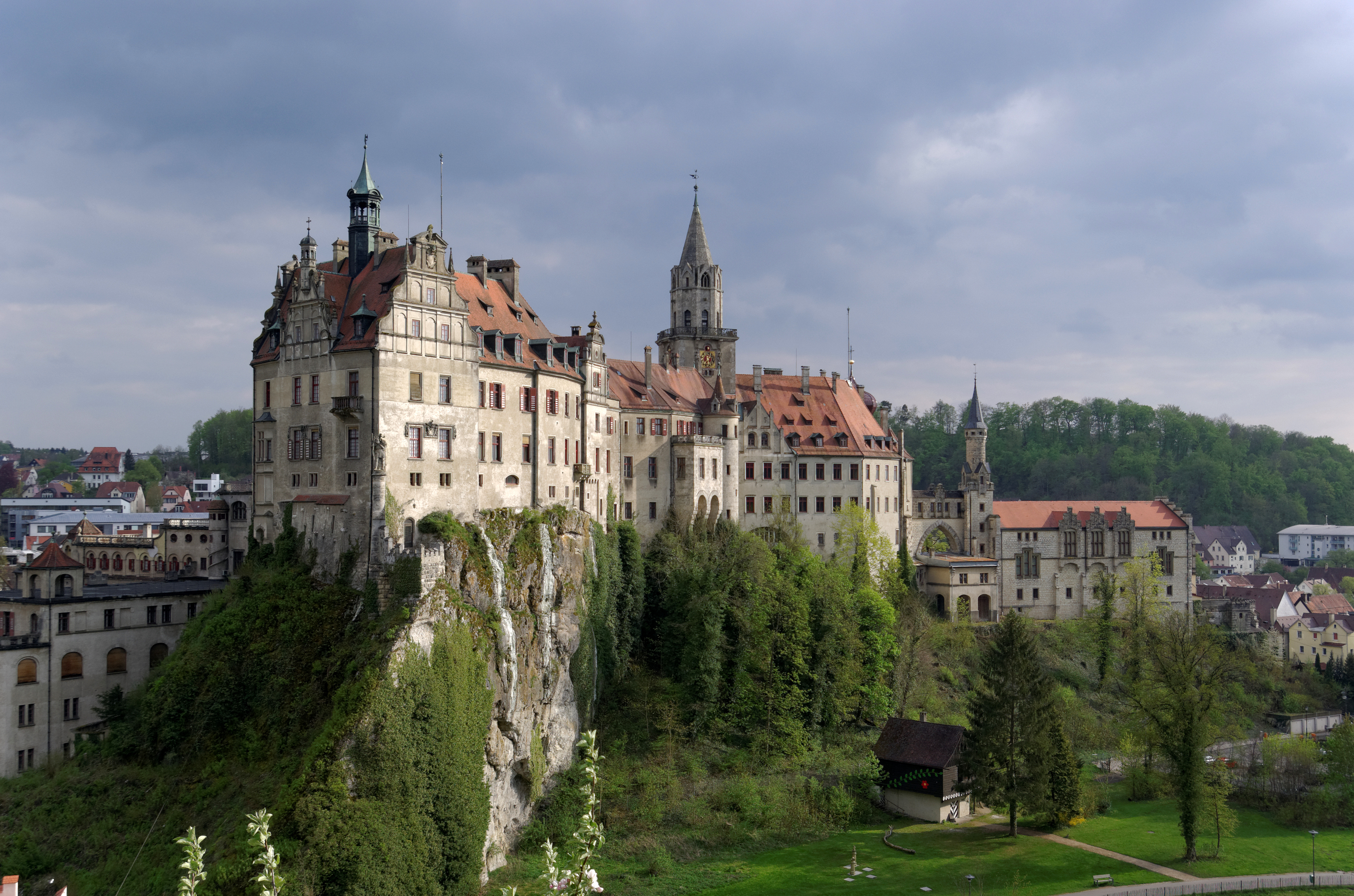
Sigmaringen Castle

The princes of Hohenzollern-Sigmaringen ruled over a small principality in south-western Germany, with a seat at Sigmaringen Castle. Unlike the Hohenzollerns of Brandenburg-Prussia, the Hohenzollerns of Sigmaringen remained Roman Catholic, along with their cousins of Hohenzollern-Hechingen (the senior line of the Swabian branch of the House of Hohenzollern) and Hohenzollern-Haigerloch.

The principality became a sovereign state in 1815 after the abolition of the Holy Roman Empire in 1806 and an independent realm following the Napoleonic Wars in 1815. Its ruler, Charles, was deposed in the revolutions of 1848. His son, Karl Anton, succeeded him, and turned to Prussia for aid. Prussian troops arrived in August 1849, and in a treaty signed in December Hohenzollern-Sigmaringen was annexed by Prussia, effective in March 1850. The annexation of their state did not, however, mean the end of the importance of the House of Hohenzollern-Sigmaringen.

The last prince, Karl Anton, served as Minister President of Prussia from 1858 to 1861. Karl Anton's second son, Karl Eitel of Hohenzollern-Sigmaringen became prince (1866–1881) and then King of Romania, under the name Carol (reigned 1881–1914). The house remained on the throne until the end of the Romanian monarchy in 1947. The last King of Romania, Michael, died on 5 December 2017.

Because the eldest Hechingen line of the Hohenzollerns became extinct in 1869 with the death of Constantine, Prince of Hohenzollern-Hechingen, the head of the Sigmaringen branch, Karl Anton, dropped his line's suffix and took the title of Prince (Fürst) of (all) Hohenzollern.

French opposition to the candidacy of Carol's elder brother Prince Leopold for the throne of Spain triggered the Franco-Prussian War (1870–1871), which led to the founding of the German Empire in January 1871.

== Territories, titles and styles ==
=== Southern Germany ===
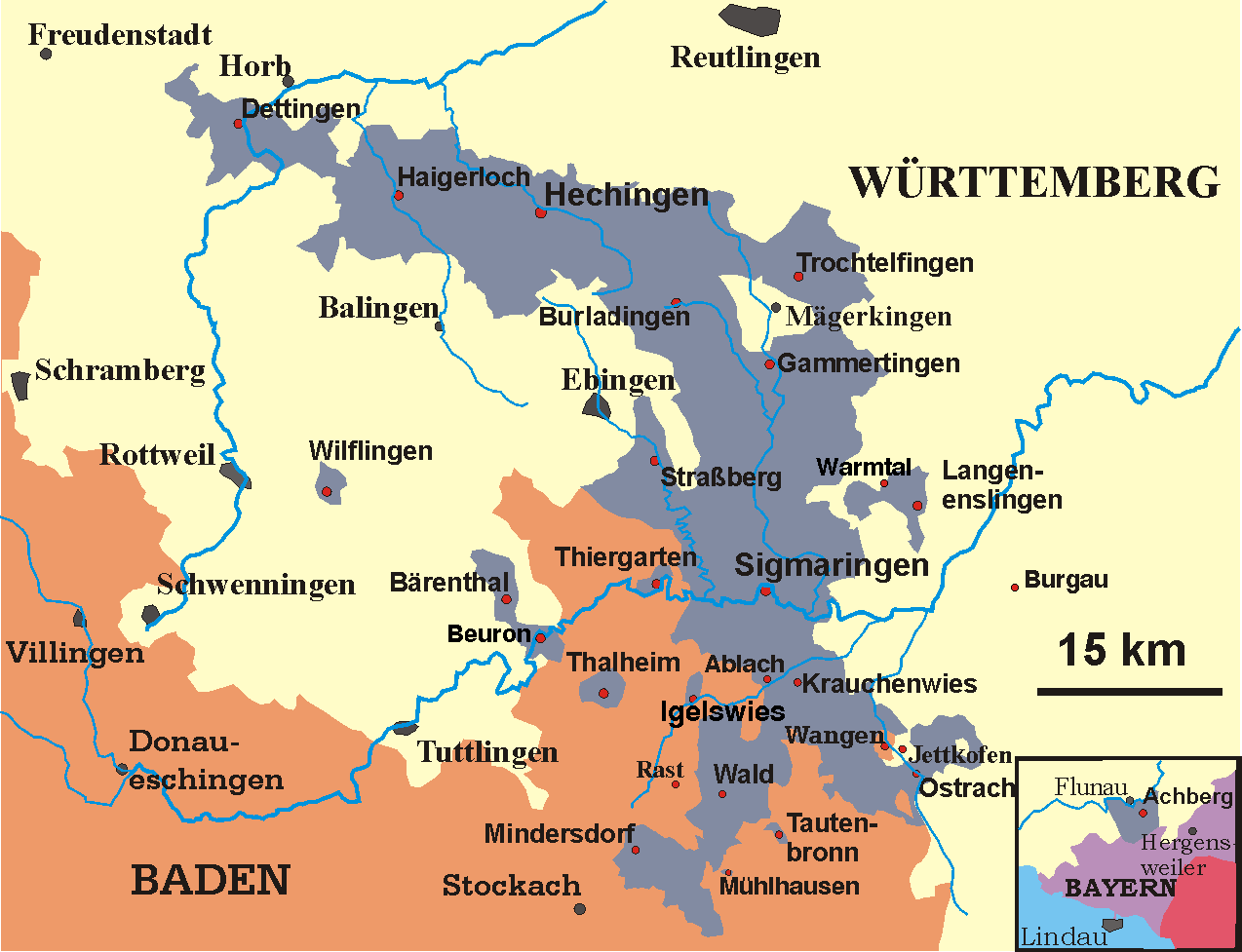
Hohenzollern region, Württemberg, Germany

==== Jurisdiction ====
The head of the Swabian branch of Hohenzollern-Sigmaringen ruled over the following territories:

- County of Hohenzollern (1061)
- Burgraviate of Nuremberg (1192)
- County of Veringen (1535)
- Lordship of Haigerloch (1634)
- Lordship of Wehrstein (1634)
- County of Bergh (1781)

From 1061 until 1806 five of these fiefs (not including Nuremberg) constituted an immediate territory of the Holy Roman Empire under the counts of Zollern, vassals of the Holy Roman Emperor.

From 1806 until 1813 the Hohenzollern lands were a realm of the Confederation of the Rhine, a short-lived state set up by Napoleon I Bonaparte. From 1815 until 1849 the principality was a sovereign country and a member of the German Confederation. In 1849 it lost its independence, and was incorporated into the Kingdom of Prussia as the Province of Hohenzollern.

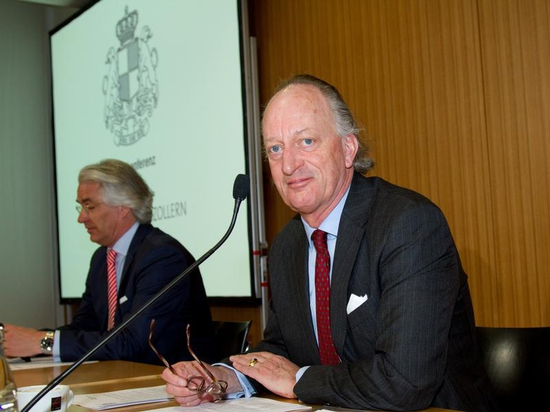
Karl Friedrich, Prince of Hohenzollern, head of the Swabian branch of the House of Hohenzollern

The German Confederation was succeeded in 1866 by the North German Confederation, which itself was succeeded by the German Empire in 1871. In 1918, the Kingdom of Prussia became the Free State of Prussia, and the German Empire was replaced by the Weimar Republic. In 1933 the republic was replaced by the Third Reich. After the defeat of the Nazis the province of Hohenzollern was merged with other territories into the state of Württemberg-Hohenzollern. This state was part of the Allied Occupation Zones in Germany until 1952. In that year, the state of Württemberg-Hohenzollern was merged into Baden-Württemberg, a state of the Federal Republic of Germany.

Karl Friedrich, Prince of Hohenzollern, is the head of the princely Swabian line.

==== Titles ====
The head of the House of Hohenzollern-Sigmaringen is the historical heir to the titles of:

- Prince (Fürst) of Hohenzollern
- Burgrave (Burggraf) of Nuremberg
- Imperial Count (Reichsgraf) of Hohenzollern
- Count (Graf) of Sigmaringen
- Count (Graf) of Veringen
- Count (Graf) of Bergh
- Lord (Herr) of Haigerloch
- Lord (Herr) of Wehrstein

==== Styles ====
The historical titulature of rulers of the House of Hohenzollern was, in the German original: Seine Durchlaucht (S.D.) [name] von Gottes Gnaden, Fürst von Hohenzollern, Burggraf von Nürnberg, Graf zu Sigmaringen, Veringen und Berg, Herr zu Haigerloch und Wehrstein.

The English translation is: His Serene Highness (HSH) [name] by the Grace of God, Prince of Hohenzollern, Burgrave of Nuremberg, Count of Sigmaringen, Veringen and Berg, Lord of Haigerloch and Wehrstein.

=== Romanian branch ===
House of Hohenzollern-Sigmaringen (Romanian branch) House of Hohenzollern-Romania House of Romania
- Parent house: Hohenzollern
- Country: Romania
- Founded: 10 May 1866
- Founder: Carol I
- Current head: Margareta of Romania
- Final ruler: Michael I
- Titles: Prince (Domnitor, or Principe) (1866–1881), King (Rege) (1881–1947)
- Deposition: 30 December 1947 (the communist coup when the king was forced to abdicate)

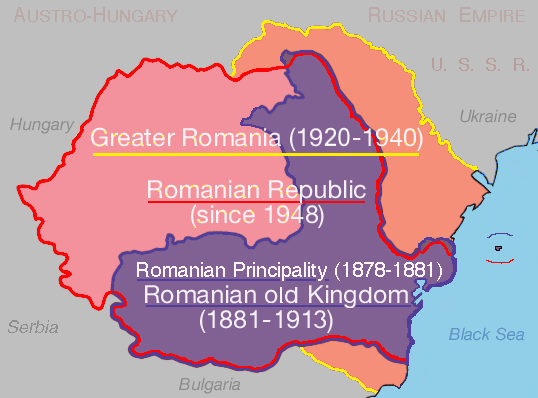
Territorial evolution of Romania

The modern state of Romania was formed by union of the principalities of Moldavia and Wallachia in 1859, under the prince domnitor Alexandru Ioan Cuza. He was replaced by Karl Eitel of Hohenzollern-Sigmaringen in 1866, who ascended the throne as Carol I, Prince of Romania.

During the Russo-Turkish War (1877–78), Romania, which was a functionally independent vassal of the Ottoman Empire, proclaimed its full independence. After the commander of the Russian armies had requested Romania's help, Carol accepted to enter the war with the condition of being appointed as commander of the armies that were besieging Plevna. After the end of the Romanian War of Independence in the 1878, at the Treaty of Berlin, Romania was subsequently recognized as an independent state by the Great Powers.

In return for reverting to the Russian Empire three southern Bessarabian districts that had been regained by Moldavia after the Crimean War in 1852, Dobruja was acquired.

In 1881, the principality was raised to a kingdom and Prince Carol became King Carol I. He reigned until his death in 1914, and was succeeded by his nephew, Ferdinand. Shortly after taking the throne, Ferdinand, a Roman Catholic like his predecessor, agreed to have his children reared in the Romanian Orthodox Church.

In 1918 Transylvania and Bessarabia were incorporated. In 1918–19, confirmed by the Treaty of Versailles of 1919 and the Treaty of Trianon of 1920, most of the Banat became part of Romania. Also, Bukovina was incorporated in 1918.

Ferdinand died in 1927. His eldest son, Crown Prince Carol, having renounced his rights, Carol's only son Michael ascended the throne. In 1930, however, Carol reclaimed the throne and was crowned Carol II. Carol was forced to abdicate in 1940, and Michael re-mounted the throne. His reign, and that of the dynasty, ended when he was forced to abdicate by a communist regime in 1947.

On 10 May 2011, following lawsuits brought in Germany against his family by his German relatives regarding attribution of the title Prince of Hohenzollern-Veringen to his son-in-law, Radu Duda, Michael severed dynastic ties with the princely house of Hohenzollern-Sigmaringen, changed the name of his family to "of Romania", and ceased the use of all princely titles borne by him and his family that derived from the German Hohenzollerns.

==== Titles ====
The head of the Romanian branch continued, since abolition of the monarchy, to use the hereditary title he bore while reigning:

- Michael I, King of Romania

During the reign of Carol II of Romania his son, Michael, was styled Măria Sa (M.S.) Marele Voievod de Alba Iulia or, in English translation, "His Highness The Grand Voivode of Alba Julia".

==== Styles ====
The Romanian original is: Majestatea Sa (M.S.) N.N., Regele Românilor (or Maiestatea Sa (M.S.) N.N., Regele României; both forms are accepted by the Romanian Academy)

The English translation is: His Majesty (H.M.) N.N., King of Romania

== Coats of arms ==
=== Southern Germany ===
==== Major coat of arms ====
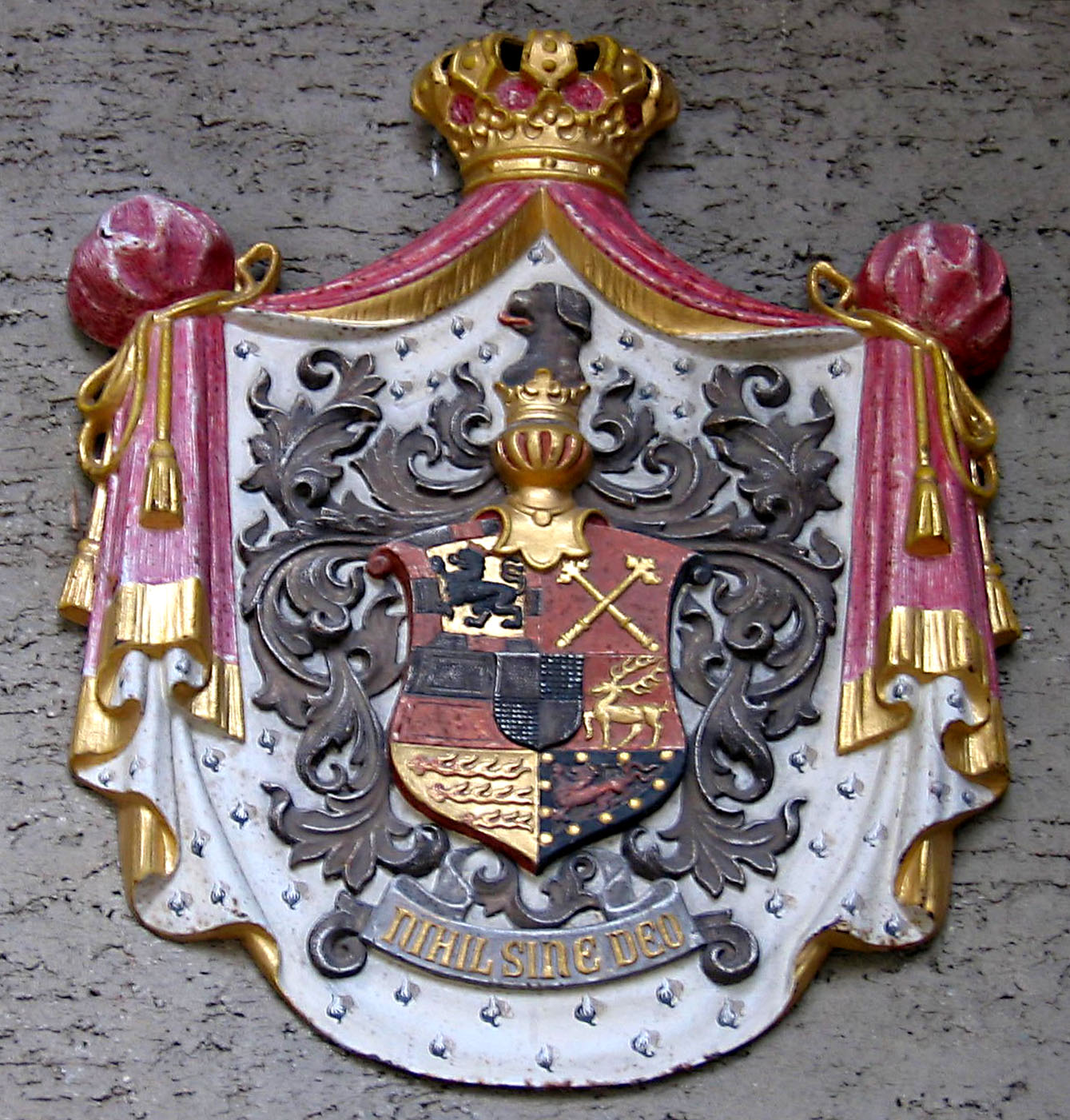
Combined coat of arms of the House of Hohenzollern-Sigmaringen (1849)

The combined coat of arms of the House of Hohenzollern-Sigmaringen is:

- Escutcheon: quartering of the shield, parted per pale, twice parted per fess, with an inescutcheon
  - first sixth: Burgraviate of Nuremberg (1214), on or (gold) a lion rampant sable (black) and a bordure of argent (silver) and gules (red)
  - second sixth: Hereditary Chamberlain of the Holy Roman Empire (1504), on gules (red, two crossed scepters in or (gold)
  - third sixth: Lordship of Haigerloch and Wehrstein (1634), parted per fess gules (red) and argent (silver)
  - fourth sixth: Countship of Sigmaringen (1535), on gules (red) a deer or (gold)
  - fifth sixth: Countship of Veringen (1535), on or (gold) three deerhorns horizontally with twice four, and once three antlerpoints gules (red)
  - sixth sixth: County of Bergh (1781), on argent (white) a lion rampant gules (red) and a bordure of sable (black) with roundels or (gold)
  - inescutcheon: Countship of Zollern (1061), quarterly sable (black) and argent (silver)
- helm: or (gold) a helmet barred and affronté (sovereign), crowned with a coronet of a German prince (Fürstenkrone)
- crest: sable (black) and argent (white) a head and shoulders of a German hound (Deutsche Bracke) (1317)
- wreath: sable (black) and argent (white)
- mantling: manteld sable (black), doubled argent (white) upon a crowned (Fürstenkrone) baldeqin gules (red), doubled ermine
- motto:
  - until the 19th century: Hie guet Zollere allwege (We were always good Zollern)
  - from the 19th century onwards: Nihil Sine Deo (Nothing without God)

==== Family coat of arms ====
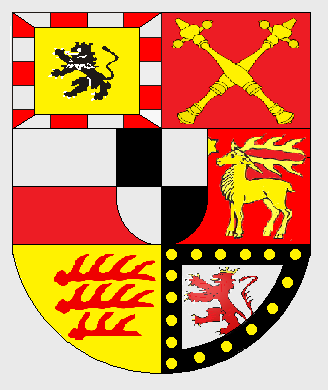
Coat of arms of the House of Hohenzollern-Sigmaringen

The combined coat of arms with inclusion of the House coat of arms of the House of Hohenzollern-Sigmaringen is:

- Escutcheon: quartering of the shield, parted per pale, twice parted per fess, with an inescutcheon
  - first sixth: Burgraviate of Nuremberg (1214), on or (gold) a lion rampant sable (black) and a bordure of argent (silver) and gules (red)
  - second sixth: Hereditary Chamberlain of the Holy Roman Empire, on gules (red, two crossed scepters in or (gold)
  - third sixth: Lordship of Haigerloch and Wehrstein (1634), parted per fess gules (red) and argent (silver)
  - fourth sixth: Countship of Sigmaringen (1535), on gules (red) a deer or (gold)
  - fifth sixth: Countship of Veringen (1535), on or (gold) three dearhorns horizontally with twice four, and once three antlerpoints gules (red)
  - sixth sixth: County of Bergh (1781), on argent (white) a lion rampant gules (red) and a bordure of sable (black) with roundels or (gold)
  - inescutcheon: Countship of Zollern (1061), quarterly sable (black) and argent (silver)
- helm: seven particular helmets, equivalent to the seven particular coat of arms (Hohenzollern, Nuremberg, Sigmaringen, Veringen, Berg, Haigerloch and Wehrstein)
- crest: seven particular crests, equivalent to the seven particular coat of arms (Hohenzollern, Nuremberg, Sigmaringen, Veringen, Berg, Haigerloch and Wehrstein)
- wreath: sable (black) and argent (white)
- mantling: manteld sable (black), doubled argent (white)
- supporter: two German hounds
- compartment: grassy

=== Romania ===
Coat of arms of the Kingdom of the Romanians (1921)

The major coat of arms of the Kingdom of Romania consisted, from 1922 onwards, of:

- an escutcheon of the combination of the territories of:
  - Wallachia
  - Moldavia
  - Dobruja
  - Transylvania
  - Bessarabia
  - Banat
  - Oltenia
  - Bukovina
  - an inescutcheon of the House of Hohenzollern: quarterly sable (black) and argent (silver)
- crest: The Steel Crown of Romania
- mantling: a crowned baldeqin gules (red), doubled ermine
- motto: Nihil Sine Deo (Nothing without God)
- supporter: two rampant lions
- compartment: ground

== Line of succession ==
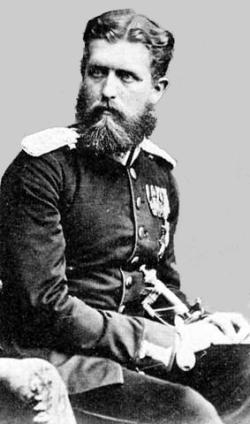
Leopold, Prince of Hohenzollern

Following cession of their sovereignty over the principality to their kinsmen the kings of Prussia in 1849, the heirs of Karl Anton continued to bear the same title, "Prince (Fürst) of Hohenzollern":

- Karl Anton, Prince 1849–1885 (1811–1885), became Prince of Hohenzollern on the death of the last Prince of Hohenzollern-Hechingen in 1869
  - Leopold, Prince 1885–1905 (1835–1905)
    - Wilhelm, Prince 1905–1927 (1864–1927)
      - Friedrich, Prince 1927–1965 (1891–1965)
        - Friedrich Wilhelm, Prince 1965–2010 (1924–2010)
          - Karl Friedrich, Prince 2010–present (born 1952)
            - Alexander, Hereditary Prince (born 1987)
          - Prince Albrecht of Hohenzollern (born 1954)
          - Prince Ferdinand of Hohenzollern (born 1960)
            - Prince Aloys of Hohenzollern (1999)
            - Prince Fidelis of Hohenzollern (born 2001)
        - Prince Johann Georg of Hohenzollern (1932–2016)
          - Prince Carl Christian of Hohenzollern (born 1962)
            - Prince Nickolas of Hohenzollern (born 2004)
          - Prince Hubertus of Hohenzollern (born 1966)
      - Franz Joseph, Prince of Hohenzollern-Emden (1891–1964)
        - Prince Emanuel of Hohenzollern-Emden (1929–1999)
          - Prince Carl Alexander of Hohenzollern-Emden (born 1970)

== See also ==
- House of Hohenzollern
- Sigmaringen
- Sigmaringen Castle
