= Gerd Hurm =

German scholar and professor of American studies

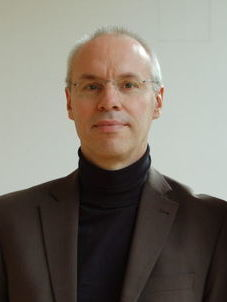
Prof. Dr. Gerd Hurm

Gerd Hurm (born June 12, 1958 in Oberndorf am Neckar) is a German scholar and professor of American studies. Gerd Hurm is the son of the artist Karl Hurm.

== Early life ==
Gerd Hurm grew up in the small village of Weildorf, attended schools in Weildorf and Haigerloch, and graduated from high school (Abitur) in Balingen. From 1980 to 1986 Gerd Hurm studied English, German, and Geography at the University of Freiburg, Germany; as an exchange student he also attended King's College London, Great Britain and the University of North Carolina at Chapel Hill, USA. He completed his MA in 1986, his PhD in 1989, and his post-doctoral thesis (Habilitation) in 1999 at the University of Freiburg.

== Career ==
In 1990 he started teaching in Freiburg. From 1994 to 1995 he was a Fulbright visiting professor at the University of Massachusetts Amherst, USA.

Since 2001 he has been a professor of English and American studies at the University of Trier. Together with Professor Wolfgang Klooß he founded the Trier Center for American Studies (TCAS) in 2004, of which he is also the director. He was a visiting professor at Clark University in Worcester, Mass., USA, in autumn 2002 and a Fulbright visiting professor at Portland State University, Portland, Oregon, USA in 2006-2007 and the summer of 2012.

His main areas of research are modern and postmodern American literature, (urban literature, Beat generation) rhetoric and media studies (American political discourse), gender studies, as well as African-American literature and culture. In recent years his focus has been on postwar America (writing articles and giving lectures on Allen Ginsberg, James Dean and Jack Kerouac, to name a few). In 2005 he contributed to the exhibition Coolhunters (ZKM Karlsruhe); in 2007 he co-edited the interdisciplinary essay collection Rebels Without a Cause (Peter Lang Publishing Group), to encourage a revaluation of the period. In the summer of 2009 he was co-curator of the exhibition Motorcycle: Beschleunigung und Rebellion? at the European Academy of Fine Arts in Trier.

== Publications ==
=== Monographs ===
- Hurm, Gerd. Fragmented Urban Images: The American City in Modern Fiction from Stephen Crane to Thomas Pynchon. Frankfurt: Lang, 1991.
- ---: Rewriting the Vernacular Mark Twain: The Aesthetics and Politics of Orality in Samuel Clemens’s Fictions. Trier: WVT, 2003.

=== Edited books ===
- ---: (with Paul Goetsch), ed. The Fourth of July: Political Oratory and Literary Reactions, 1776-1876. ScriptOralia 45. Tübingen: Narr, 1992.
- ---: (with Paul Goetsch), ed. Die Rhetorik amerikanischer Präsidenten seit F.D. Roosevelt. ScriptOralia 54. Tübingen: Narr, 1993.
- ---: (with Paul Goetsch), ed. Important Speeches by American Presidents after 1945. anglistik & englischunterricht 54. Heidelberg: Winter, 1994.
- ---: (with Ann Marie Fallon), ed. Rebels without a Cause? Renegotiating the American 1950s. Oxford: Lang, 2007.
- ---: (with Anke Reitz and Shamoon Zamir), ed. The Family of Man Revisited: Photography in a Global Age, London, I. B. Tauris, 2018
