= Karl I of Hohenzollern =

Count of Hohenzollern from 1525 to 1575

Karl I, Count of Hohenzollern
- Born: 1516; Brussels, Spanish Netherlands
- Died: 18 March 1576; Sigmaringen Castle
- Noble family: House of Hohenzollern-Swabia
- Spouse: Anna of Baden-Durlach
- Father: Eitel Friedrich III, Count of Hohenzollern
- Mother: Johanna van Witthem

Karl I of Hohenzollern (1516 in Brussels – 18 March 1576 at Sigmaringen Castle) was Count of Hohenzollern from 1525 to 1575. He was Imperial Archchamberlain and chairman of the Aulic Council from 1556 to 1559

== Life ==
Karl was the eldest son of the Count Eitel Friedrich III of Hohenzollern (1494–1525) from his marriage to Johanna van Witthem (d. 1544), daughter of Philip, Lord of Beersel and Boutersem. Karl was Imperial Archchamberlain and later chairman of the Aulic Council. In 1534, he received the Counties of Sigmaringen and Veringen as imperial fiefs from Emperor Karl V.

Karl married in 1537 with Anna (1512–1579), a daughter of Margrave Ernst of Baden-Durlach, with whom he had several children, among them:

- Ferfried (1538–1556),
- Marie (1544–1611),
- Eitel Friedrich IV (1545–1605), later the first Count of Hohenzollern-Hechingen
- Karl II (1547–1606), later the first Count of Hohenzollern-Sigmaringen
- Johanna (1548–1604),
- Jacobea Marie (1549–1578) wife of Leonard V of Harrach (1542–1597),
- Eleanor (1551–1598),
- Christoph (1552–1592), later the first Count of Hohenzollern-Haigerloch
- Magdalena (1553–1571), a nun in Holz,
- Joachim (1554–1587), titular Count of Hohenzollern
- Kunigunde (1558–1595), a nun at Inzigkofen Abbey

He had held the family possessions in a single hand since the Counts of Haigerloch had died out with the death of his cousin Jobst Nicholas II in 1558. After his death in 1576, however, they were divided. His eldest son, Eitel Friedrich IV became the founder of the Hohenzollern-Hechingen line. His second son, Karl II, founded the Hohenzollern-Sigmaringen. The third son, Christoph, founded the Hohenzollern-Haigerloch line, which died out in 1634, with Christoph's share falling to Hohenzollern-Sigmaringen. The youngest son, Joachim, received the county of Zollern. This line was the first to die out, when Joachim's son Joachim Georg died in 1602.

== Ancestry ==
Ancestors of Karl I of Hohenzollern

16. Eitel Friedrich I, Count of Hohenzollern
8. Jobst Nikolaus I, Count of Hohenzollern
17. Ursula of Rhäzüns
4. Eitel Friedrich II, Count of Hohenzollern
18. John IV, Count of Werdenberg-Sargans
9. Countess Agnes of Werdenberg-Heiligenberg
19. Elisabeth of Württemberg
2. Eitel Friedrich III, Count of Hohenzollern
20. Frederick I, Elector of Brandenburg
10. Frederick III of Brandenburg
21. Elisabeth of Bavaria
5. Magdalene of Brandenburg
22. Barnim VIII, Duke of Pomerania
11. Princess Agnes of Pomerania-Wolgast
23. Anna of Wunstorf
1. Karl I, Count of Hohenzollern
24. Hendrik II van Wittem
12. Hendrik III Corsselaar van Wittem, Baron van Boutersem
25. Jacoba van Glymes
6. Filips Corsselaar van Wittem, Baron van Boutersem
26. Bernard van der Spout
13. Elisabeth van der Spout
27. Elisabeth d'Enghien
3. Johanna van Wittem
28. Wouter IV van Halewijn
14. Johan II van Halewijn, Vicomte de Roulers
29. Jacqueline de Wisch
7. Countess Johanna van Halewijn
30. Jean II de la Clite
15. Countess Jeanne de la Clite, Vicomtesse de Nieuwpoort
31. Jeanne d'Estouteville

Karl I of Hohenzollern House of Hohenzollern Born: 1516 Died: 18 March 1576
Preceded by Eitel Friedrich III	Count of Hohenzollern; 1525–1576	Succeeded by Eitel Friedrich IV as Count of Hohenzollern-Hechingen
Preceded by Eitel Friedrich III	Count of Hohenzollern; 1525–1576	Succeeded by Karl II as Count of Hohenzollern-Sigmaringen
Preceded by Jobst Nicholas II	Count of Haigerloch; 1558–1576	Succeeded by Christoph as Count of Hohenzollern-Haigerloch
