= Joachim of Zollern =

German nobleman

- Born: 21 June 1554; Sigmaringen
- Died: 7 July 1587 (aged 33); Cölln
- Buried: Berlin Cathedral
- Noble family: House of Hohenzollern
- Spouse: Anna of Hohnstein
- Father: Karl I, Count of Hohenzollern
- Mother: Anna of Baden-Durlach

Joachim von Hohenzollern (21 June 1554, in Sigmaringen – 7 July 1587, in Cölln) was a titular Count of Hohenzollern.

== Life ==
Joachim was the 4th surviving son of Count Karl I of Hohenzollern (1516–1576) from his marriage to Anna (1512–1579), the daughter of Ernst, Margrave of Baden-Durlach.

As the younger son, he was destined for a career in the clergy, typically as a canon. In order to avoid this, Joachim converted to the Lutheran faith. He was the only member of the Swabian branch of the House of Hohenzollern to do so. He broke away from the Catholic relatives and moved to the Protestant court of the Elector of Brandenburg in Berlin.

Joachim died on 7 July 1587 and was buried in Berlin Cathedral.

== Marriage and issue ==
On 6 July 1578 in Lohra, he married Anna (d. 1620), the daughter of Count Volkmar Wolf of Hohnstein. They had one son:

- Johann Georg (1580–1622), Count of Hohenzollern, Lord of Königsberg-Kynau, married:
  1. in 1606 to Baroness Elonore of Promnitz (1576–1611)
  2. in 1613 to baroness Katharina Berka of Duba and Leipa (d. 1633)
