= Karl Anton von Hohenzollern =

Karl Anton von Hohenzollern may refer to:

- Karl Anton, Prince of Hohenzollern (born 1811), reigning Prince of Hohenzollern and Prussian prime minister
- Prince Karl Anton of Hohenzollern (born 1868), member of the princely house and Prussian general, grandson of the above

== See also ==
- Karl von Hohenzollern (disambiguation)
