= Karl Hurm =

German painter (1930–2019)

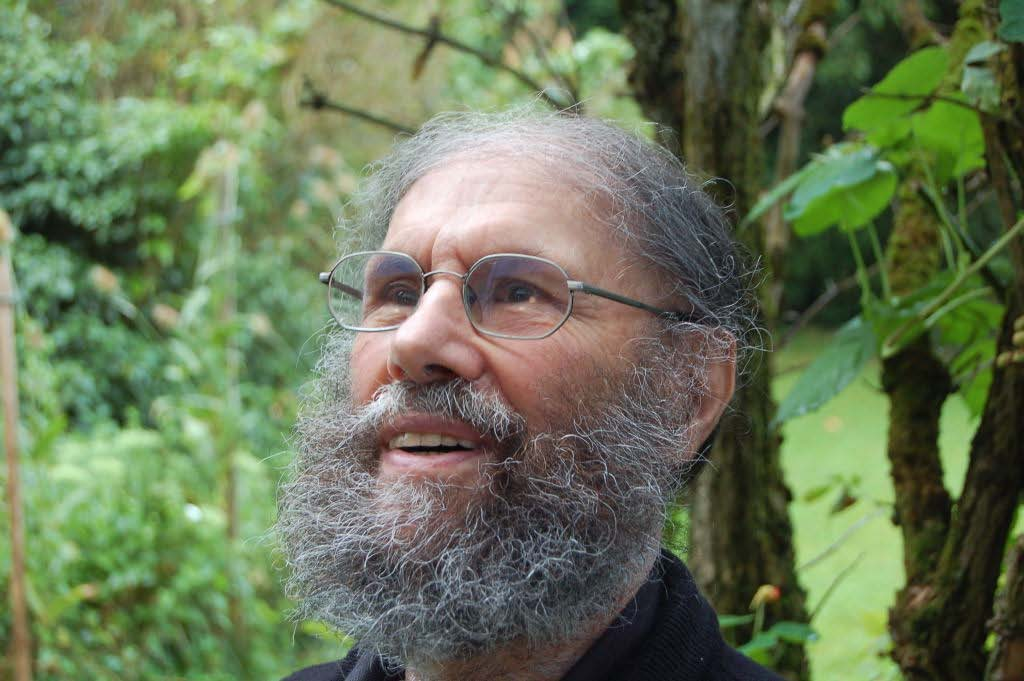
Karl Hurm, 2010

Karl Hurm (December 29, 1930 in Weildorf/Haigerloch – June 8, 2019) was a contemporary German painter. Hurm was a self-taught artist whose paintings in the style referred to as naïve art have been on permanent display in an exhibition at the municipal art museum Ölmühle in Haigerloch (Germany) since 1998.

== Life ==
Karl Hurm was born in 1930 as the seventh of eight children. He began painting as a child, depicting the surroundings of his home village Weildorf, as he himself put it: "painting has always been a part of my daily life". After finishing school in 1946, he became an apprentice in house painter and decorator. Along the way, he gathered information about regional painters, visited the artist Friedrich Schüz (1874–1954) and heard about a group of young artists who worked in the Bernstein Monastery. After Hurm had taken over his parents' fruit- and vegetable retail store in Weildorf in 1949, he used his weekly shopping trips to the wholesalers' market in Stuttgart to visit the museums there and study the masterpieces of painters like Pablo Picasso and Paul Klee, Henri Rousseau and Paul Gauguin, Marc Chagall and Jean Tinguely, whom he later named as sources of inspiration for his own motifs and painting technique. In 1955, Karl Hurm married Anni Huber, they have four children, one of them is Gerd Hurm, a professor for American studies. Hurm continued working as a greengrocer and kept on painting in his leisure time.

When in 1970 Karl Hurm became seriously ill, he had to give up working in the greengrocery business and from then on concentrated on painting only. In 1972, his painting titled "Frau beim Fernsehen" (transl.: woman watching television) won first prize at the "Sunday-painter's competition" for amateur artists of the Eisenmann Company, in Böblingen. Later that same year, Hurm's first individual exhibition was shown at the gallery "die schwarze Treppe", in Haigerloch. Since that time, Karl Hurm's paintings have been displayed in more than 200 individual and collective exhibitions in Europe, the United States, as well as in Japan. Hurm lived and painted in Haigerloch-Weildorf.

== Paintings ==
It is difficult to assign Karl Hurm's paintings begun in the 1970s to a certain style; they are often referred to as "naïve art". Hurm started as a "Sunday painter" and created his individual, substantial oeuvre. Most of his works are oil paintings on hard-fiber boards, small formats set in self-made wooden frames. In the early 1970s, Hurm depicted lively scenes in a naïve manner („Die Arche Noah“, 1973, transl.: Noah's Ark). Save for a few exceptions, in this painting every creature is shown in its proper place, every object is given its realistic shade of colouring. From early on Hurm knew how to lead the viewer's eye through his paintings by his unconventional interpretation of proportions. (Das Paradies, 1972, transl.: Paradise)

To date, his Swabian home and its changes over time and seasons is the basic inspiration of many of Hurm's paintings. Prominent subjects are people, houses, cows, horses, meadows and forests, landscapes in the changing seasons, scenes of everyday life. But he is not stuck in the cliché of the rural idyll, he is non-judgmentally aware of the inconsistencies and rough edges of modernity. He plays with these themes in multiple variations, so that none of his paintings resembles another, each one is unique.

Over the years, Karl Hurm withdrew more and more from portraying real life. With many layers of paint applied with fine brushes, he created a parallel universe with shapes disconnected from reality, using emotional effects of colours to create special atmospheres. With unrestrained imagination Hurm distanced moments of everyday life, set new emphases with idiosyncratic rules. Thus, in Viadukt in der Winterlandschaft (1988, transl.: Viaduct in winter landscape) small, stocky men seem to be hiding from tall, voluptuous, red-haired women, or, in Gelber Hügel (1998, transl.: Yellow hill), a man is depicted as a lonely beholder of nature. Houses are arranged in a pile to form a mountain (Turm in der Winterlandschaft, 1986, transl.: Tower in winter landscape), birds take on the colours and outlines of bushes (Großer Vogel mit drei Bäumen, 1986, transl.: Big bird with three trees). Winter landscapes and interiors gave Hurm the opportunity to explore "unconventional dominances of colours" (Blumenstrauß mit gelbem Vorhang, 1989, transl.: bouquet of flowers with yellow curtain). Hurm also experimented with the colours red, white, blue, and brown, and placed them as colour filters over his motifs (Blauer Stadtteil, 1988, transl.: Blue suburb). In the 1990s, Hurm's colours developed a life of "delimitation". were detached from their subjects. Colours enveloped groups (Grüne Vögel bei den Kühen, 1999, transl.: green birds with cows) set expressive, high-contrast emphases. Hurm transitioned to abstraction reminiscent of cave paintings. (Tierherde im Winter, 2000, transl.: herd of cattle/animals in winter).

=== Collages ===
In the 1990s, Karl Hurm increasingly integrated objects of everyday life into his paintings, in order to add a third dimension. Fragments of panty hoses, shoelaces, brush bristles, chain links, wire mesh, string bags, twigs and beechnuts were pasted into compositions in the collage technique. Chewing gum, pressed flat into moulds as bas-reliefs, slightly raise figures above the surface to produce sculptural effects. During that same period, Karl Hurm also experimented with different surfaces like old furnace doors, iron plates, metal sheets, or pieces of wood as base materials in order to create paintings that seem to have originated in distant prehistoric times. The specific fabrics and structures were interpreted and accentuated by the colours.

=== Drawings ===
Karl Hurm started painting as a child. Neither his early work nor the sketches which he created on the backs of commercial documents during his time as a greengrocer have been preserved. The drawings that have been retained since the 1960s are not to be interpreted as drafts but as self-contained works of art, precise compositions with a passion for detail. Hurm drew whenever colours, brush and easel were not at hand.

== Exhibitions and acquisitions ==
Since 1969, Karl Hurm has participated in the exhibitions of naïve art at the Gallery Eisenmann, Böblingen (Germany) where he won the first prize in 1972. In 1972, he is honoured by Hermann-Josef Speier with a first individual exhibition at the gallery "die schwarze Treppe", at Haigerloch (Germany). More than 200 individual and collective exhibitions followed, among them:

- 1981 Art collection at the University of Göttingen
- 1983. Naive and Outsider Painting from Germany, Museum of Contemporary Art, Chicago.
- 1984 Musee International d'Art Naif Anatole Jakovsky, Nice
- 1996 Staatsgalerie Stuttgart(Exhibition in Bad Wimpfen)
- 1998 Grosvenor Museum, Chester
- 1999 Gallery K, London
- 2003 Vestisches Museum, Recklinghausen

Since 1998, Karl Hurm's oeuvre has been on permanent display in an exhibition at the municipal art museum Ölmühle in Haigerloch. Sammlung Würth, Künzelsau, has a representative selection of his work (more than 200 oil paintings, collages, stelae, drawings).

== Publications on Karl Hurm ==
- Alexandra Cyrkel (Hrsg.): Karl Hurm zum 60. Geburtstag. Probst, Villingen-Schwenningen 1990, ISBN 3-925221-06-9. (Festschrift)
- Karl Hurm, mit einer Einführung von Karl Arndt: Der Maler Karl Hurm. Göttingen 1980, OCLC 314792404.
- Barbara Lipps-Kant, Karl Arndt: Karl Hurm in der Ölmühle Haigerloch. Tübingen 1998. (Ausstellungskatalog)
- Barbara Lipps-Kant, Karl Arndt: Karl Hurm – Gemälde, Materialbilder, Zeichnungen 1980–2000. Tübingen 2000.
- Günther Wirth: Deutsche Sonntagsmaler. Braun, Karlsruhe 1978, ISBN 3-7650-9013-1.
