= Carol of Romania =

Carol of Romania may refer to:

- Carol I of Romania, king from 1881 to 1914
- Carol II of Romania, king from 1930 to 1940
