= Hürm =

- Municipality
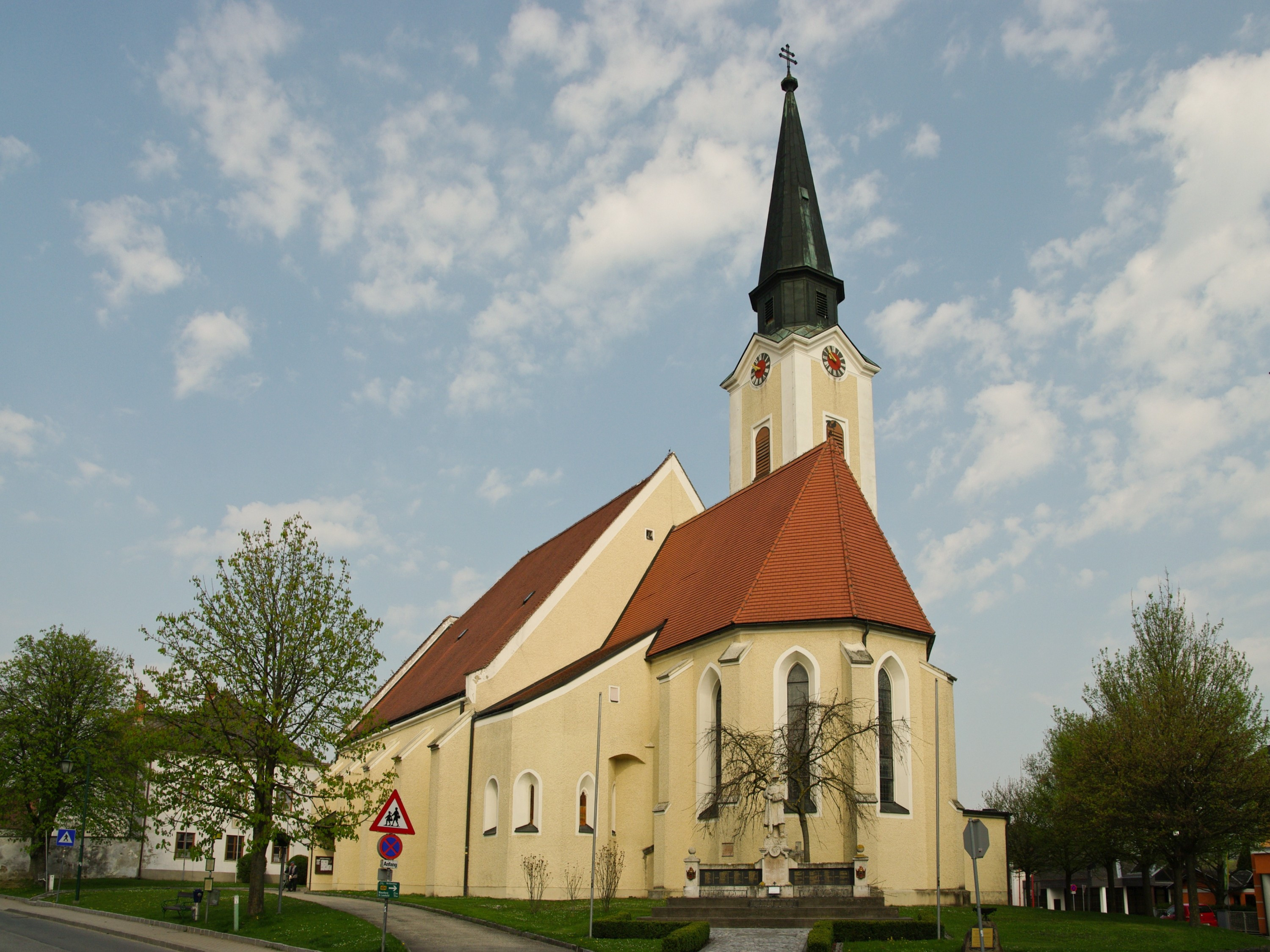
- Hürm parish church

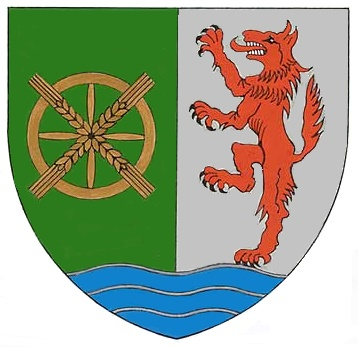
- Coat of arms

- Location within Austria
- Coordinates: 48°9′N 15°25′E
- Country: Austria
- State: Lower Austria
- District: Melk

Government
  - Mayor: Anton Fischer

Area
  - Total: 36.09 km^{2} (13.93 sq mi)
- Elevation: 274 m (899 ft)

Population (2018-01-01)
  - Total: 1,828
  - Density: 50.65/km^{2} (131.2/sq mi)
- Time zone: UTC+1 (CET)
  - Summer (DST): UTC+2 (CEST)
- Postal code: 3383
- Area code: 02754
- Website: www.huerm.at

Hürm is a town in the district of Melk in the Austrian state of Lower Austria.

== Population ==
Historical population
Year	Pop.	±%
1971	1,650	—
1981	1,617	−2.0%
1991	1,581	−2.2%
2001	1,702	+7.7%
2019	1,818	+6.8%
