= Charles II of Hohenzollern-Sigmaringen =

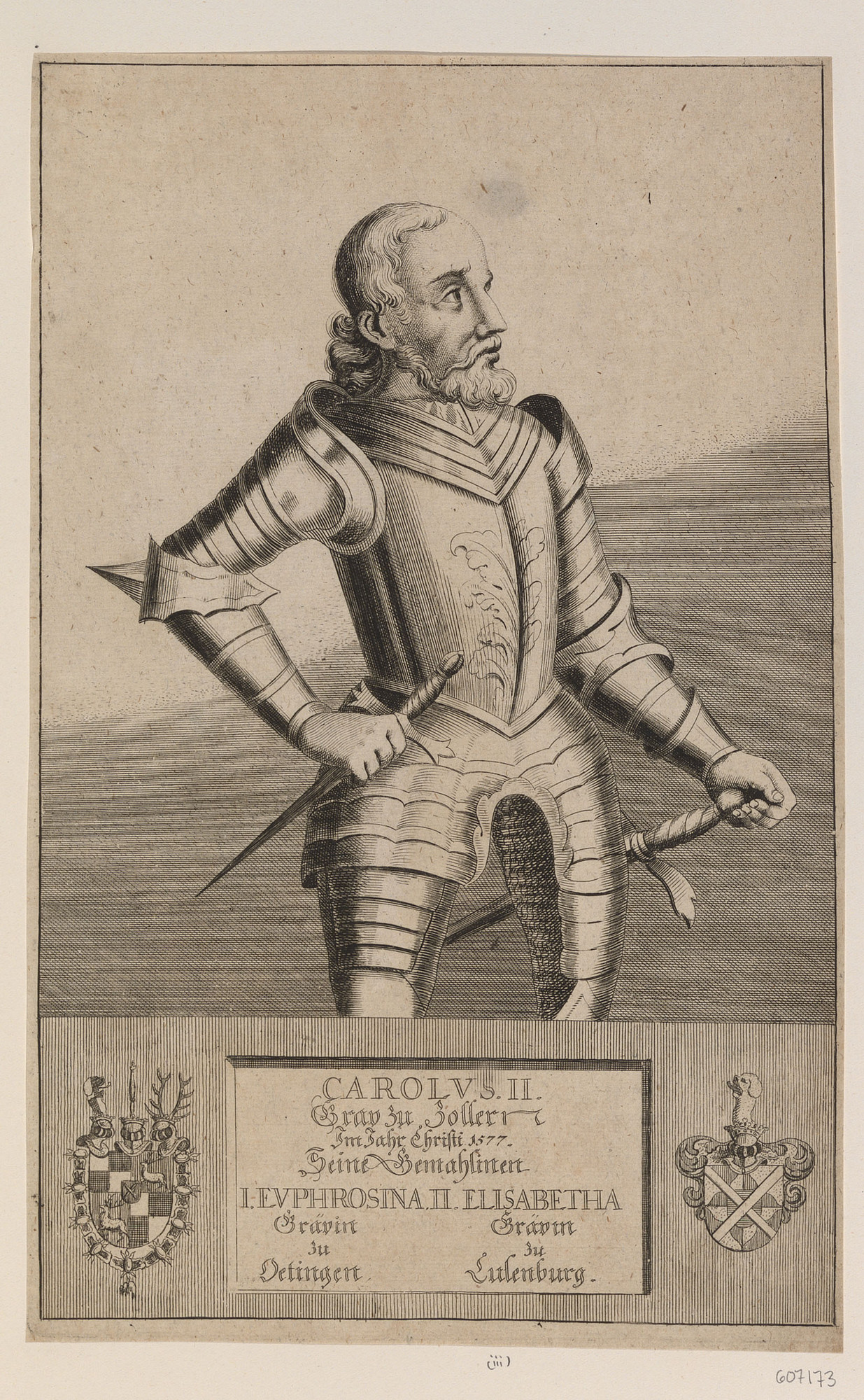
Charles II, Count of Hohenzollern-Sigmaringen

Charles II, Count of Hohenzollern-Sigmaringen (German: Karl II, Graf von Hohenzollern-Sigmaringen; 1547 – 8 April 1606) became Count of Hohenzollern-Sigmaringen in 1576 and remained so until his death. He was the fifth but second surviving son of Charles I, Count of Hohenzollern, and Anna, daughter of Ernest, Margrave of Baden-Durlach.

== Life ==
Initially, he was educated in Vienna, and later in Freiburg im Breisgau jointly with his older brother Eitel Friedrich. Later, he assisted to the Aulic Council in Vienna, where his father served as president; there, he gained the trust and friendship of Ferdinand II, Archduke of Further Austria, (son of Holy Roman Emperor Ferdinand I) and went into his service to Tyrol, being able to established good connections with the Holy Roman Empire, which was seen in 1570 when he was appointed Supreme Captain and Governor in Alsace. Two years later, Charles II took over the guardianship of Count Jakob of Geroldseck.

Under the rule of his father Charles I the possessions of the county of Zollern (who in the narrow sense where the districts of Sigmaringen, Böhringen, Haigerloch and Wehrstein) was still united. The three oldest sons were entitled to jointly inherit, but in 1576 they decided to contract a pact of inheritance, where they received each of them an economically equivalent part of the county, founding the three lines of Hohenzollern-Hechingen, Hohenzollern-Haigerloch, and Hohenzollern-Sigmaringen.

Charles II received the district of Sigmaringen with the monasteries of Hedingen and Inzigkofen and the County of Veringen. However, Hohenzollern-Sigmaringen had high inheritance taxes to paid to the Holy Roman Empire. A judgment of the Reichskammergericht in 1588 stated that the County of Sigmaringen was an imperial fief. However, this assessment was until 1806 called into question.

Charles II chose Sigmaringen as his main residence and rebuild Sigmaringen Castle. Between 1576 and 1606 he ordered the construction of the vault in the castle and a church next. In 1589 he acquired the Ratzenhofen Castle in the village of Sigmaringendorf. In 1595 he bought the district of Krauchenwies, which remained closely connected with the County of Sigmaringen until 1850, when was annexed by Prussia.

== Marriages and Issue ==
In Munich on 18 January 1569 Charles II married firstly with Euphrosyne (1552 – 5 October 1590), a daughter of Frederick V, Count of Oettingen-Wallerstein. They had fifteen children:

- Ferdinand (24 August 1571 – 1 November 1571).
- Anna Marie (1 June 1573 – 1 June 1598), married on 15 February 1589 to Markus Fugger, Lord of Kirchberg-Weissenhorn in Kirchheim (son of Hans Fugger).
- Maria Magdalena (9 January 1574 – 2 January 1582).
- Barbara (11 January 1575 – 15 May 1577).
- Maria Jakobe (3 January 1577 – 18 March 1650), married on 14 April 1595 to Heinrich Truchsess of Waldburg-Wolfegg.
- Johann (17 August 1578 – 22 March 1638), the first Fürst (Prince) of Hohenzollern-Sigmaringen, elevated in 1623.
- Karl (24 September 1579 – 23 March 1585).
- Euphrosyne (6 November 1580 – 4 February 1582).
- Eitel Friedrich (26 September 1582 – 19 September 1625), Cardinal (1621), Bishop of Osnabrück (1623–25).
- Maria Maximiliane (31 October 1583 – 11 September 1649), married firstly on 25 January 1598 to Joachim Ulrich, Freiherr z Hradce (von Neuhaus), and secondly on 25 October 1605 to Adam II of Sternberg.
- Ernst Georg (7 May 1585 – 19 April 1625), married on 18 February 1611 with Marie Jakobe of Raitenau, with whom he had two daughters.
- Maria Eleonore (29 October 1586 – 1668), married on 20 February 1605 with Johann Fugger the Elder, Count of Kirchberg-Weissenhorn.
- Maria Sabine (12 November 1587 – 1590).
- Jakob Friedrich (9 August 1589 – 25 August 1589).
- Maria (born and died 15 September 1590).

In Sigmaringen on 13 May 1591, Charles II married secondly with Elisabeth (1567 – 8 May 1620), a daughter of Floris, Freiherr of Palant and Count of Cuylenburg, and widow of James III, Margrave of Baden-Hachberg. They had ten children:

- Maria Elisabeth (10 January 1592 – 28 October 1659), married firstly on 21 September 1608 with Johann Christoph, Count of Hohenzollern-Haigerloch, and secondly on 14 October 1624 with Count Karl Ludwig of Sulz, Landgraf in Klettgau.
- Georg Friedrich (16 March 1593 – 9 May 1593).
- Maria Salome (2 February 1595 – 10 November 1595).
- Maria Juliane (4 February 1596 – 1669).
- Philipp Eusebius (30 January 1597 – 3 November 1601).
- Christian (born and died 3 February 1598).
- Maria Cleopha (11 June 1599 – 26 February 1685), married firstly on 6 November 1618 with Johann Jakob, Count of Bronckhorst and Anholt, and secondly on 29 March 1632 with Philippe-Charles, 3rd Count of Arenberg.
- Maria Christiane (22 May 1600 – 1634).
- Maria Katharine (24 November 1601 – 1602).
- Maria Amalie (born and died 1 January 1603).

== Ancestry ==
Ancestors of Charles II of Hohenzollern-Sigmaringen

16. Jobst Nikolaus I, Count of Hohenzollern
8. Eitel Friedrich II, Count of Hohenzollern
17. Countess Agnes of Werdenberg-Heiligenberg
4. Eitel Friedrich III, Count of Hohenzollern
18. Frederick III of Brandenburg
9. Magdalene of Brandenburg
19. Princess Agnes of Pomerania-Wolgast
2. Karl I, Count of Hohenzollern
20. Hendrik III Corsselaar van Wittem, Baron van Boutersem
10. Filips Corsselaar van Wittem, Baron van Boutersem
21. Elisabeth van der Spout
5. Johanna van Wittem
22. Johan II van Halewijn, Count of van Roeselare
11. Countess Johanna van Halewijn
23. Countess Johanna van La Clyte
1. Charles II, Count of Hohenzollern-Sigmaringen
24. Charles I, Margrave of Baden-Baden
12. Christoph I, Margrave of Baden-Baden
25. Catherine of Austria
6. Ernest, Margrave of Baden-Durlach
26. Philipp II the Younger of Katzenelnbogen
13. Ottilie of Katzenelnbogen
27. Ottilie of Nassau-Siegen
3. Anna of Baden-Durlach
28. Albrecht III Achilles, Elector of Brandenburg
14. Frederick I, Margrave of Brandenburg-Ansbach
29. Anna of Saxony
7. Princess Elisabeth of Brandenburg-Ansbach-Kulmbach
30. Casimir IV Jagiellon
15. Sophia of Poland
31. Elizabeth of Austria
