= Eitel Friedrich IV of Hohenzollern =

Founder and first Count of the line Hohenzollern-Hechingen (1545–1605)

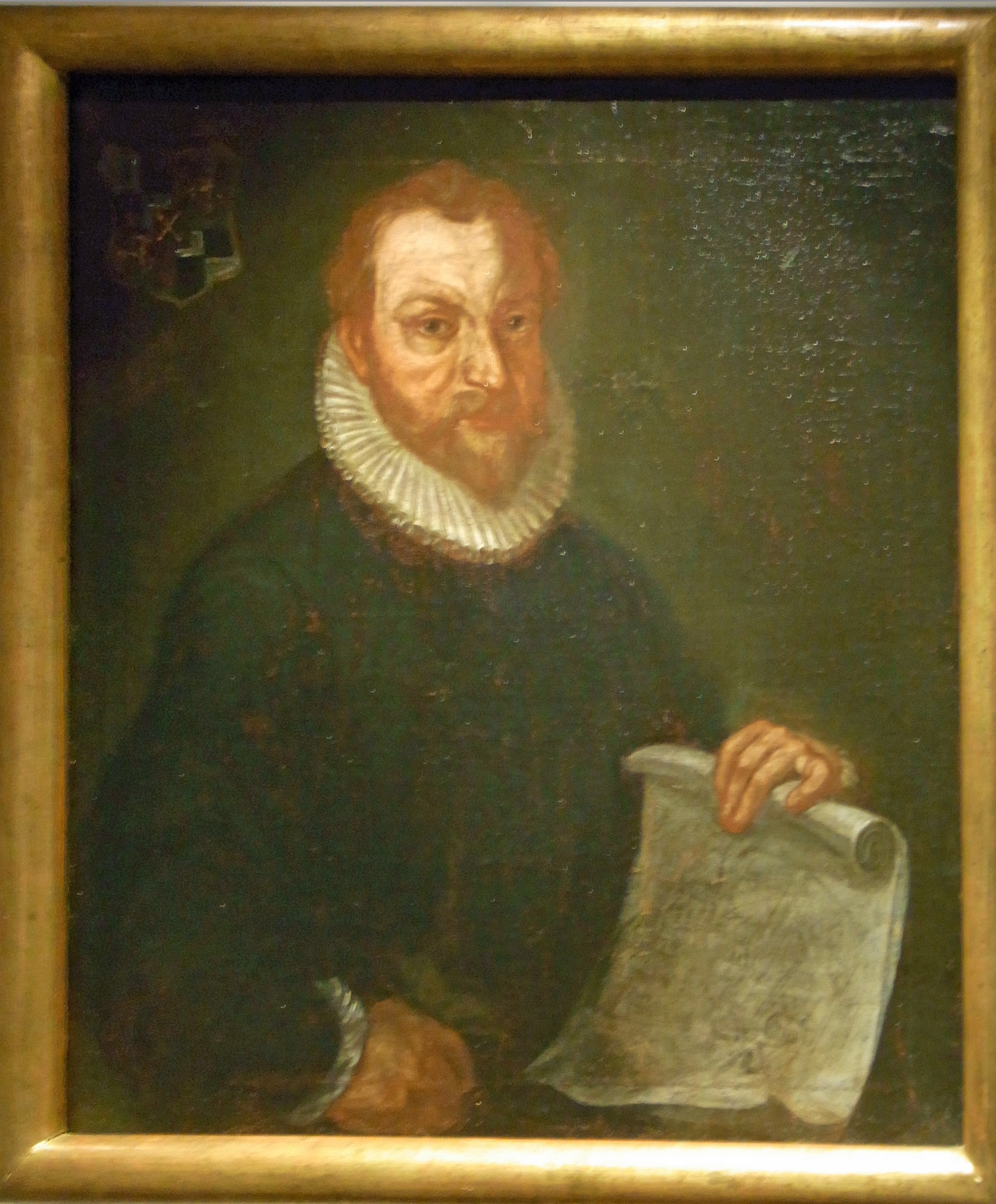
- Eitel Friedrich IV
- Born: 7 September 1545; Sigmaringen
- Died: 16 January 1605 (aged 59); Hechingen
- Buried: Church of the St. Luzen monastery
- Noble family: House of Hohenzollern
- Spouses: Veronika of Ortenburg; Sibylle of Zimmern; Johanna of Eberstein
- Father: Karl I, Count of Hohenzollern
- Mother: Anna of Baden-Durlach

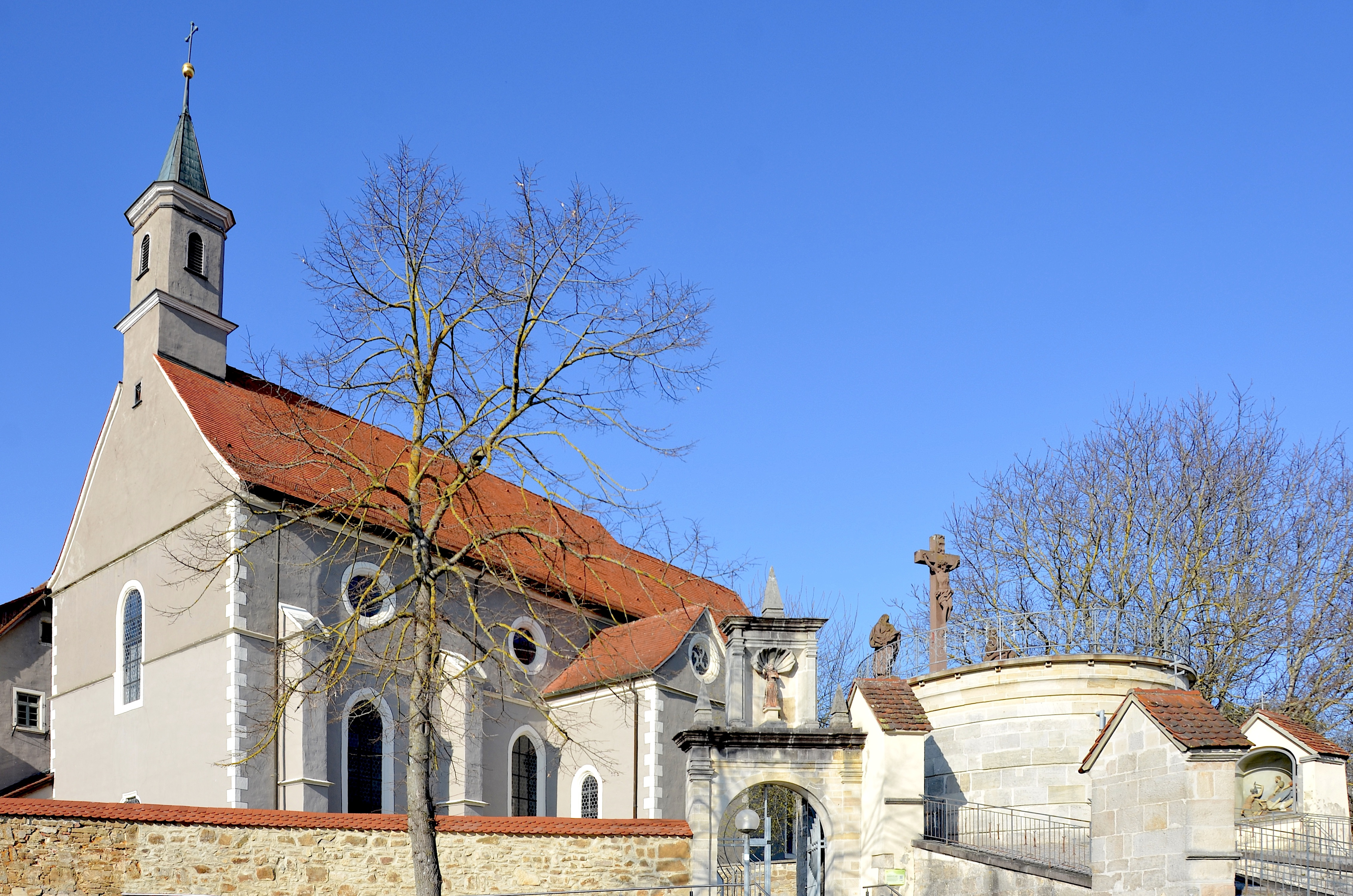
Monastery Church St. Luzen in Hechingen

Count Eitel Friedrich IV of Hohenzollern (7 September 1545 in Sigmaringen – 16 January 1605 in Hechingen) was the founder and first Count of the line Hohenzollern-Hechingen as Eitel Friedrich I.

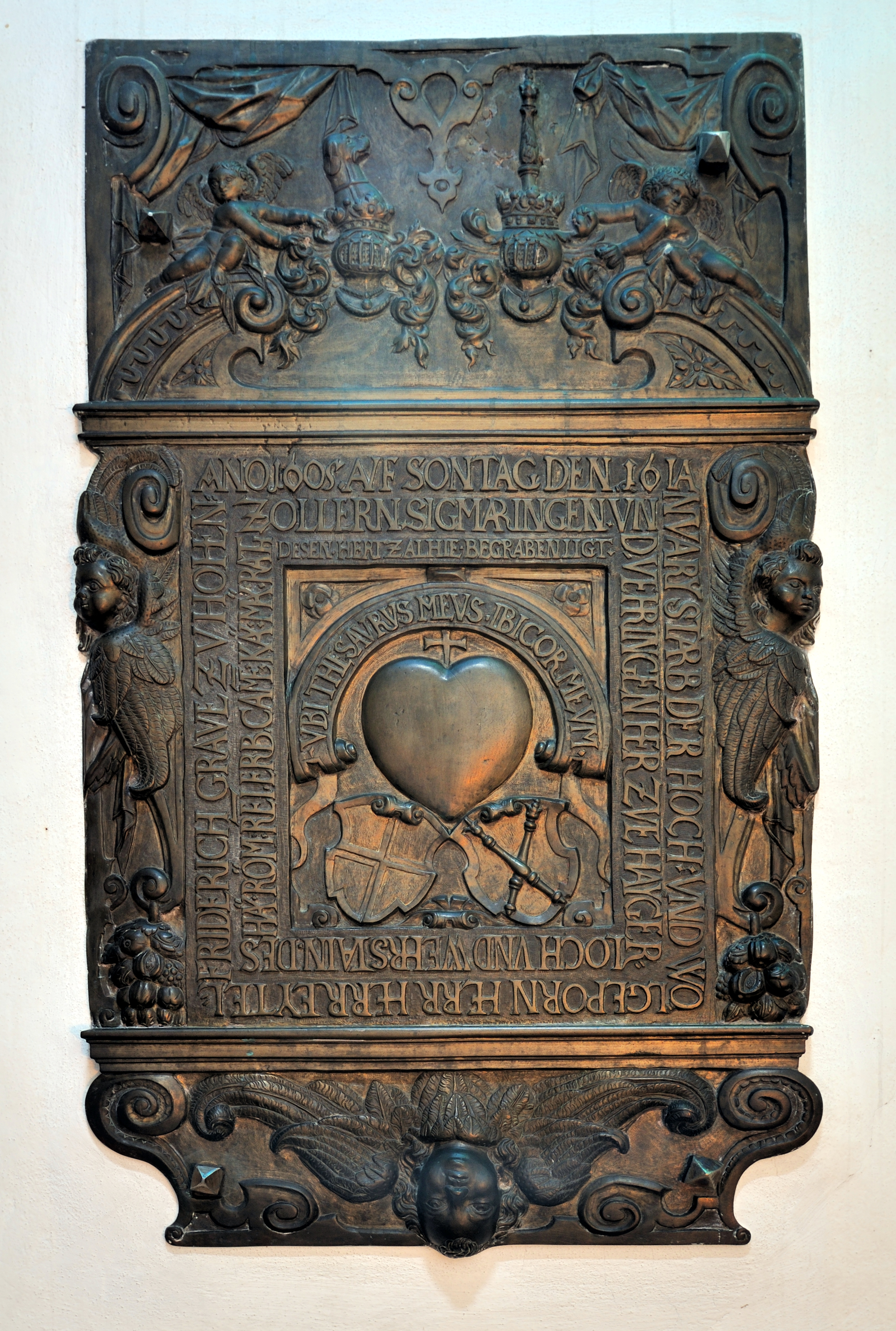
Ubi thesaurus meus, ibi cor meum, bronze grave plate in the monastery church of St. Luzen

== Early life ==
Eitel Friedrich was the eldest surviving son of Count Karl I of Hohenzollern (1516–1576) from his marriage to Princess Anna of Baden-Durlach (1512–1579), daughter of the Margrave Ernst of Baden-Durlach.

== Biography ==
After his father's death in 1576, Hohenzollern was divided. Eitel Friedrich became the founder of the Hohenzollern-Hechingen line; his brother Karl founded the Hohenzollern-Sigmaringen line, and his brother Christoph founded the Hohenzollern-Haigerloch line. Hohenzollern-Hechingen included the original County of Zollern, with the town of Hechingen and monasteries at Rangendingen, St. Luzen and Stetten.

Eitel Friedrich reorganized the administration of the county, which his predecessors had neglected. He issued strict hunting and forestry regulation, which led to several uprisings.

In Hechingen, he built a Renaissance style residence, named the Friedrichsburg, from which the New Castle later evolved. In 1585, he and his wife founded the Franciscan monastery of St. Luzen in Hechingen. He initiated other construction projects as well, including the St. Luzen abbey church, the hospital and the lower tower. His residence became a center of culture and music, earning him the nickname the Magnificent.

He died in 1605 and his body was buried in the Zollern family tomb in the Stiftskirche in Hechingen, he had his heart buried in the Antonius Chapel in St. Luzen, church of the St. Luzen monastery. In 1609 a bronze grave plate was added, covering his heart. It bears the inscription Ubi thesaurus meus, ibi cor meum, "Where my treasure lies, there lies my heart" (compare Luke 12).

== Marriages and issue ==
Eitel Friedrich married three times:

1. He married firstly on 22 June 1568 to Countess Veronika of Ortenburg († 1573), the daughter of Count Karl I of Ortenburg (1501–1552) and his wife, Maximiliana von Fraunberg-Haag (d. 1559). The marriage remained childless.

2. On 14 November 1574 in Meßkirch, he married secondly Countess Sibylle von Zimmern (1558–1599), daughter of Count Froben Christoph of Zimmern and his wife, Countess Kunigunde of Eberstein (1528–1585). They had the following children:

- Ernst (born: 1575; died young)
- Johann Georg (1577–1623), Prince of Hohenzollern-Hechingen

married in 1598 Countess Franziska of Salm, Wild- and Rhinegravine of Neufville (d. 1619)

- Maximiliane (1580–1633)
- Johanna (1581–1634)

married in 1602 with Johann, Prince of Hohenzollern-Sigmaringen (1578–1638)

3. On 1 March 1601 he was married for the third time, to Countess Johanna of Eberstein (1570–1633), the daughter of Count Otto of Eberstein-Boldrungen (1533–1576) and his wife, Baroness Felicitas Colonna von Völs (b. 1535). This marriage also remained childless. After Eitel Friedrich's death Johanna married Baron Johann Friedrich of Königsegg-Aulendorf (d. 1622).

== Footnotes ==
Eitel Friedrich IV of Hohenzollern House of Hohenzollern Born: 7 September 1545 Died: 16 January 1605
| Preceded by Karl as Count of Hohenzollern | Count of Hohenzollern-Hechingen; 1576–1605 | Succeeded by Johann Georg |
