= Hohenzollern-Haigerloch =

German historical principality

Coordinates: 48°22′N 8°48′E

County of Hohenzollern-Haigerloch Grafschaft Hohenzollern-Haigerloch (German)
- 1576–1767
- Flag Coat of arms
- Motto: Nihil Sine Deo (Latin) Nothing without God
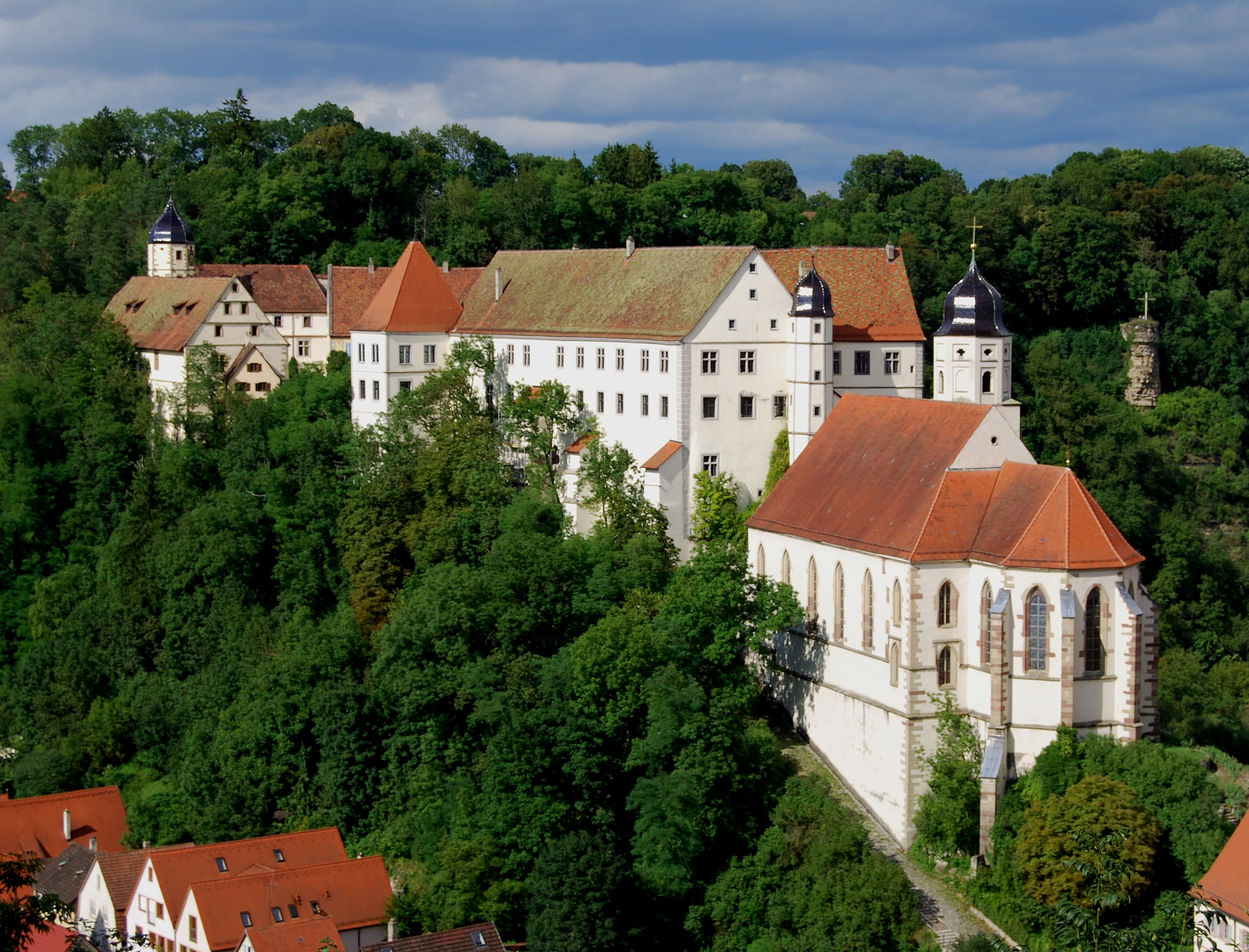
- The castle church in Haigerloch, taken from the upper town.
- Status: County
- Capital: Haigerloch
- Common languages: German
- Religion: Roman Catholic
- Historical era: Middle Ages
  - Partition of County of Hohenzollern: 1576
  - Personal union with Hohenzollern-Sigmaringen: 1634–81
  - Incorporation into Hohenzollern-Sigmaringen: 1767
Preceded by	Succeeded by
County of Zollern	Hohenzollern-Sigmaringen
- Today part of: Germany

Hohenzollern-Haigerloch was a small county in southwestern Germany. Its rulers belonged to the Swabian branch of the House of Hohenzollern. It became part of the neighboring Hohenzollern-Sigmaringen in 1767.

== History ==
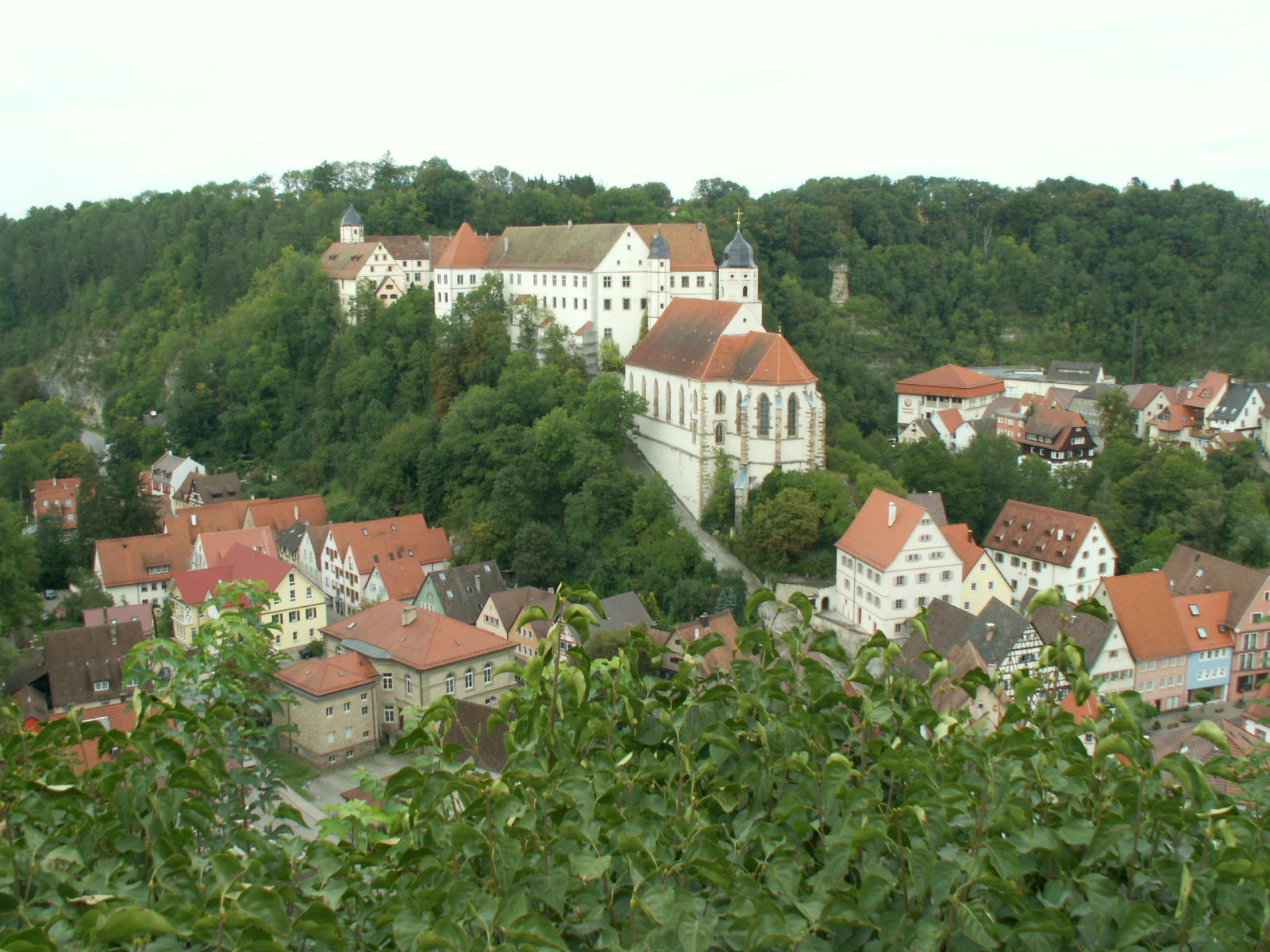
Haigerloch Castle

The more famous younger Franconian branch of the Hohenzollern family became Burgraves of Nuremberg, Margraves of Brandenburg, Kings of Prussia, and finally Emperors of Germany. Unlike their northern relatives, the Swabians remained Catholic.

The county of Hohenzollern-Haigerloch was created in 1576, when Karl I of Hohenzollern died and his lands were divided between his three sons:

- Eitel Friedrich IV of Hohenzollern-Hechingen (1545–1605)
- Charles II of Hohenzollern-Sigmaringen (1547–1606)
- Christoph of Hohenzollern-Haigerloch (1552–1592)

All three territories were located in south-western Germany and were fiefs of the Holy Roman Empire. The area is now part of the German Land of Baden-Württemberg. Hechingen, Sigmaringen, and Haigerloch were the capitals of the three states.
