= Haigerloch =

- Town
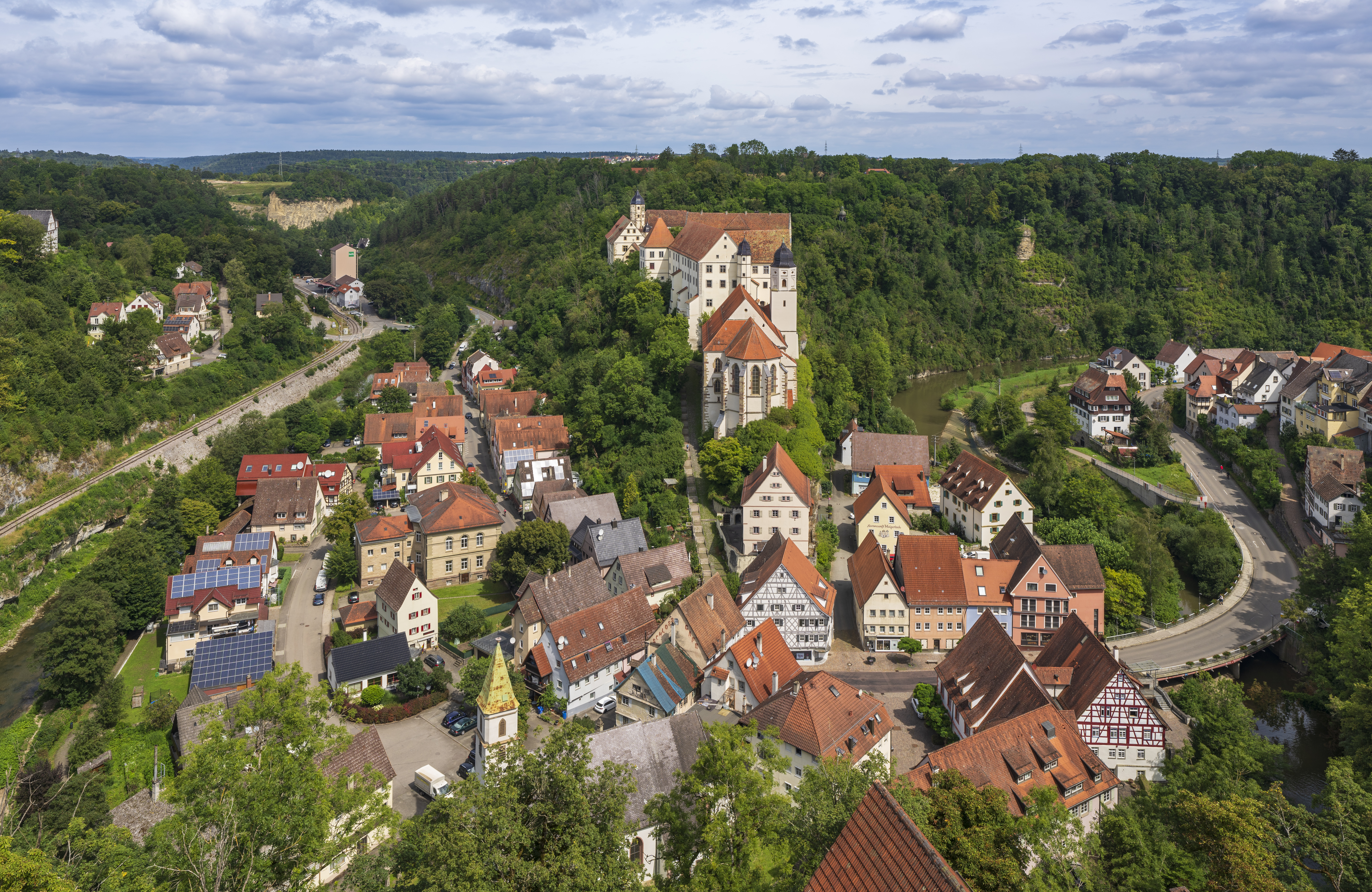
- The old town of Haigerloch lies in a bend of the river Eyach

- Coat of arms

- Location of Haigerloch within Zollernalbkreis district
- Interactive map of Haigerloch
- Location within Germany Location within Baden-Württemberg
- Coordinates: 48°21′53″N 08°48′18″E
- Country: Germany
- State: Baden-Württemberg
- Admin. region: Tübingen
- District: Zollernalbkreis
- Subdivisions: 9 Stadtteile

Government
  - Mayor (2022–30): Heiko Lebherz

Area
  - Total: 76.44 km^{2} (29.51 sq mi)
- Elevation: 492 m (1,614 ft)

Population (2025-12-31)
  - Total: 10,919
  - Density: 142.8/km^{2} (370.0/sq mi)
- Time zone: UTC+01:00 (CET)
  - Summer (DST): UTC+02:00 (CEST)
- Postal codes: 72394–72401
- Dialling codes: 07474
- Vehicle registration: BL / HCH
- Website: www.haigerloch.de

Haigerloch (German pronunciation: [ˈhaɪɡɐˌlɔx]) is a town in the north-western part of the Swabian Alb in Germany.

== Geography ==
=== Geographical location ===
Haigerloch lies at between 430 and 550 metres elevation in the valley of the Eyach river, which forms two loops in a steep shelly limestone valley. The town is therefore also called the 'Felsenstädtchen' (rocky/cliffy small town).

=== Neighbouring municipalities ===
Haigerloch's neighbouring municipalities are specified below in clockwise order from the north, and belong to the Zollernalbkreis unless indicated.

Starzach ¹, Rangendingen, Grosselfingen, Balingen, Geislingen, Rosenfeld, Sulz am Neckar ², Empfingen ³ and Horb am Neckar ³.
¹ Landkreis Tübingen, ² Landkreis Rottweil, ³ Landkreis Freudenstadt

=== Districts ===
Haigerloch consists of the following nine districts:

- Bad Imnau
- Bittelbronn
- Gruol
- Hart
- Haigerloch
- Owingen
- Stetten
- Trillfingen
- Weildorf

It is located 397 m above mean sea level and has 572 inhabitants (31 December 2011). Bad Imnau was incorporated on 1 August 1973 town Haigerloch.

=== History ===
The city came in 1381 with the reign Haigerloch to the Habsburgs, the fief passed it in the 15th century to the lords of Weitingen. In 1516 Imnau was sold to the Count of Zollern. Imnau had inhabitants:

- 1824 440,
- 1836 591
- 1890 507

=== Mineral Springs ===
Around 1700, the physician Dr Samuel Caspar discovered several small pools of bubbling mineral water in the Eyach Valley. In 1733, the Prince’s Spring (Fürstenquelle) was uncovered and named after Prince Josef Friedrich of Hohenzollern-Sigmaringen. In 1905, the Apollo Spring in Imnau was developed by the Papst family and sold the following year to Commercial Councillor Carl Haegele.<https://www.imnauer.de/unternehmen/geschichte>

History

The first documented mention of Haigerloch was in the year 1095 on the occasion of the gift of the local castle. This castle was probably located in the area around the Upper Town. By 1200 the Counts of Hohenberg appeared as the local lords and built a new castle on the Schlossberg. The lower town evolved into a market town. Rudolf I, a brother-in-law of Albert II Von Hohenberg-Haigerloch, awarded the town charter to Haigerloch before 1231. In 1268 a battle was fought just outside the city between Zollern and Hohenberg. In 1291 the city was besieged by Count Eberhard I of Württemberg; in 1347 the town was besieged again. From 1356 onward the upper town and lower town were administratively separated but were reunited when the lordship of Haigerloch was sold to Austria in 1381. The Habsburgs pawned the property on several occasions, including to the Counts of Württemberg.

In 1487 rule of the city fell to the Hohenzollern. In 1567 under Christoph von Hohenzollern-Haigerloch the area around Haigerloch was an independent territory within the area of the Holy Roman Empire as Hohenzollern-Haigerloch. In this period, the present castle complex was built on the Schlossberg as the residence of the counts of Hohenzollern-Haigerloch, replacing the former high-medieval structure. In 1634 rule of the city descended to the line of Hohenzollern-Sigmaringen, whose residence city was the city of Haigerloch between 1737 and 1769.

In the last months of World War II, Haigerloch was the location of the Kaiser Wilhelm Institute of Physics, part of the German nuclear programme, which had the goal of achieving practical use of nuclear fission. According to contemporary views, the atomic bomb was not a direct objective of this work, but initially only the construction of the Haigerloch research reactor, which was constructed in a beer cellar beneath the palace church. Through courageous negotiations by the pastor to rescue the reactor facility it was spared from demolition by an American command on April 24, 1945, and today is the site of the Atomkeller-Museum with a replica of the reactor.

== Politics ==
=== Local council ===
In the local council election of 13 June 2004, the result was:

- CDU - 15 seats
- FWV - 9 seats
- Social Ecologist List - 4 seats

== Culture and objects of interest ==
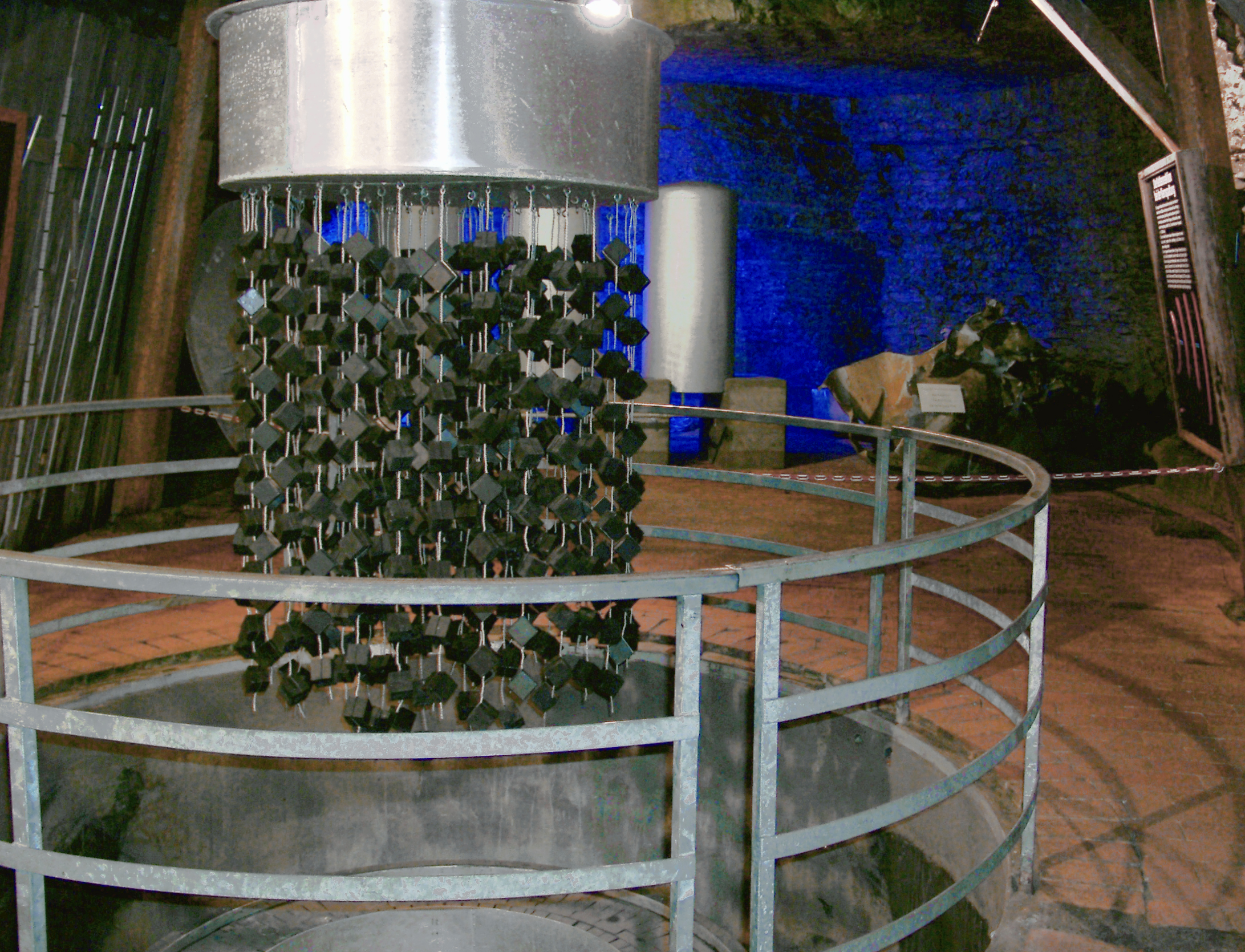
Haigerloch nuclear reactor replica

Haigerloch lies on the Ferienstraße (holiday road) and on the Hohenzollernstraße.

=== Museums ===
- Atomkeller-Museum (atomic cellar museum), former research reactor during World War II
- Synagogue Haigerloch, former synagogue

=== Notable buildings ===
- Atomic cellar in the rock under the castle church
- Roman tower Burg Haigerloch (Römerturm)
- Lower part of town church
- Jewisch cemetery (Haigerloch)
- Former synagogue

=== Partnerships between cities ===
- Noyal-sur-Vilaine, France
- Sokobanja, Serbia

== Economics and infrastructure ==
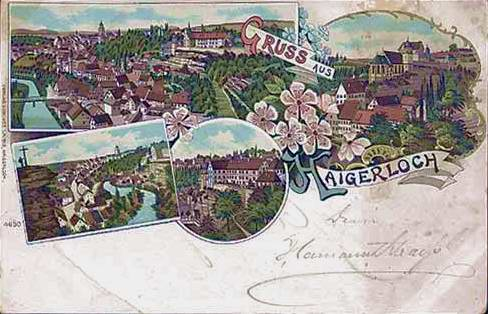
Haigerloch 1898

=== Roads ===
The L410 connects the city with Rangendingen to the east. The L360 forms the feeder, along with the federal highway B463, to the A81 motorway.

=== Local industry ===
One of the few rock salt mines still active in Germany is in the Stetten quarter. Salt has been extracted here since 1854.

== Notable people ==
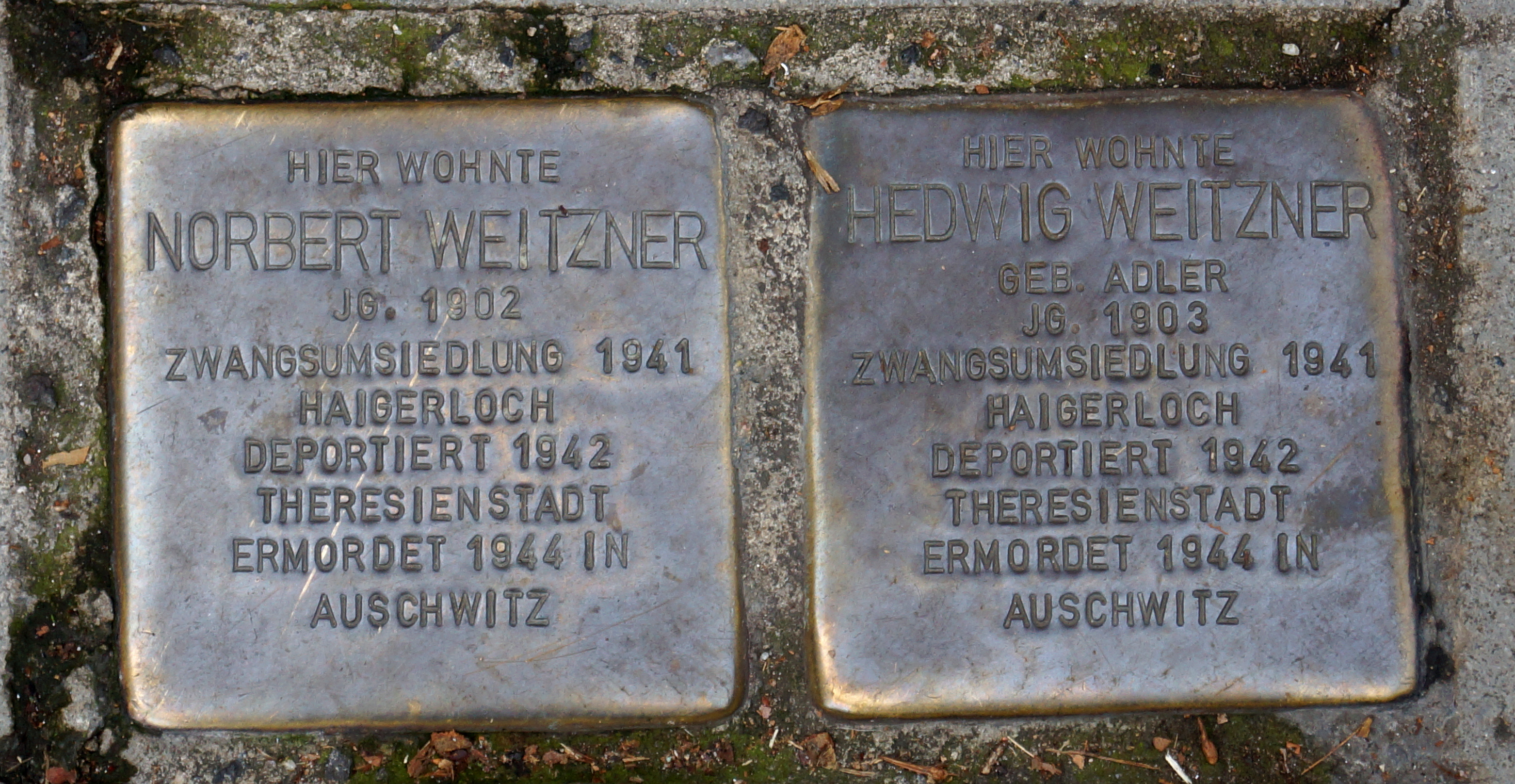
Stolpersteine in Stuttgart for Norbert and Hedwig Weitzner, IDP)

- Salomon Schweigger (1551–1622), evangelic parson and traveller to the Orient
- Christoph, Count of Hohenzollern-Haigerloch (1552–1592), first Count of Hohenzollern-Haigerloch
- Johann Christoph, Count of Hohenzollern-Haigerloch (1586–1620), second Earl of Hohenzollern-Haigerloch
- Charles, Count of Hohenzollern-Haigerloch (1588–1634), third Earl of Hohenzollern-Haigerloch
- Franz Christoph Anton, Count of Hohenzollern-Sigmaringen (1699–1767), Canon, First Minister of the Electorate of Cologne
- Christian Großbayer (1718–1782), architect of the late Baroque
- Simon Anton Zimmermann (1807–1876), conductor, choirmaster and composer
- Father Desiderius Lenz, born Peter Lenz (1832–1928), painter and founder of the Beuron School of Art
- Hermann Eger (1877–1944), born in Weildorf, politician (center), member of the Reichstag
- Karl Widmaier (1886–1931), writer
- Karl Hurm (1930–2019), painter
- Stephan Kitzinger (1748–1820), born in Haigerloch to Uri Kitzinger. 1780 Catholic Dekan at St Anna Wallfahrtskirche and 1797-1827 he served as Dekan to Karl Alexander Prince of Thurn and Taxis (1770–1827) Holy Roman Emperor Francis II´s Principal Commissioner (Prinzipalkommissar) to the Perpetual Imperial Diet (Immerwährender Reichstag) in Regensburg of then late Holy Roman Emire of German Nations at least till 1806. He died in zwiefalten.
