= Eitel =

Eitel may refer to

As a given name

- Eitel Friedrich II, Count of Hohenzollern (c. 1452–1512)
- Eitel Friedrich of Zollern (1454–1490), German nobleman and Admiral of the Netherlands
- Eitel Friedrich III, Count of Hohenzollern (1494–1525)
- Eitel Friedrich IV, Count of Hohenzollern (1545–1605)
- Eitel Frederick von Hohenzollern-Sigmaringen (1582–1625), Roman Catholic cardinal and Prince-Bishop of Osnabrück
- Prince Eitel Friedrich of Prussia (1883–1942), the second son of Emperor Wilhelm II of Germany
- Eitel Cantoni (1906–1997), Uruguayan racing driver

As a surname

- Bernhard Eitel (born 1959), German earth scientist and geographer
- Conrad Constantine Eitel (1880–1947), Australian journalist, son of Dr Ernst Eitel
- Ernst Johann Eitel (1838–1908), German Protestant missionary to China and author of a Cantonese dictionary
  - A romanisation scheme of the Cantonese language named after Ernst Johann Eitel
- George G. Eitel (1858–1928), American surgeon who designed and built Eitel Hospital in Minneapolis, Minnesota
  - Eitel Hospital
- Grzegorz Eitel (born 1981), Polish judoka
- Wilhelm Eitel (1891–1979), German-American scientist
- Eitel Brothers, German-born hoteliers and restaurateurs based in Chicago, United States
  - Eitel Building, built for David and Fred Eitel in Seattle, Washington, United States
