= Eitel Friedrich =

Eitel Friedrich may refer to:

== People ==
- Eitel Friedrich II, Count of Hohenzollern (c. 1452–1512)
- Eitel Friedrich of Zollern (1454–1490), German nobleman who served as Admiral of the Netherlands
- Eitel Friedrich III, Count of Hohenzollern (1494–1525)
- Eitel Friedrich IV, Count of Hohenzollern (1545–1605), also Count Eitel Friedrich I of Hohenzollern-Hechingen
- Eitel Frederick von Hohenzollern-Sigmaringen (1582–1625), Roman Catholic Cardinal-Priest and Prince-Bishop of Osnabrück
- Eitel Frederick II, Prince of Hohenzollern-Hechingen (1601-1661)
- Prince Eitel Friedrich of Prussia (1883–1942), Prussian prince and general
- Eitel-Friedrich Kentrat (1906–1974), German World War II naval officer

== Ships ==
- SS Prinz Eitel Friedrich, a list of ships
- SMS Prinz Eitel Friedrich, a list of ships
- Prinzess Eitel Friedrich
