= Johann, Prince of Hohenzollern-Sigmaringen =

Count (later Prince) of Hohenzollern-Sigmaringen (1606-1638)

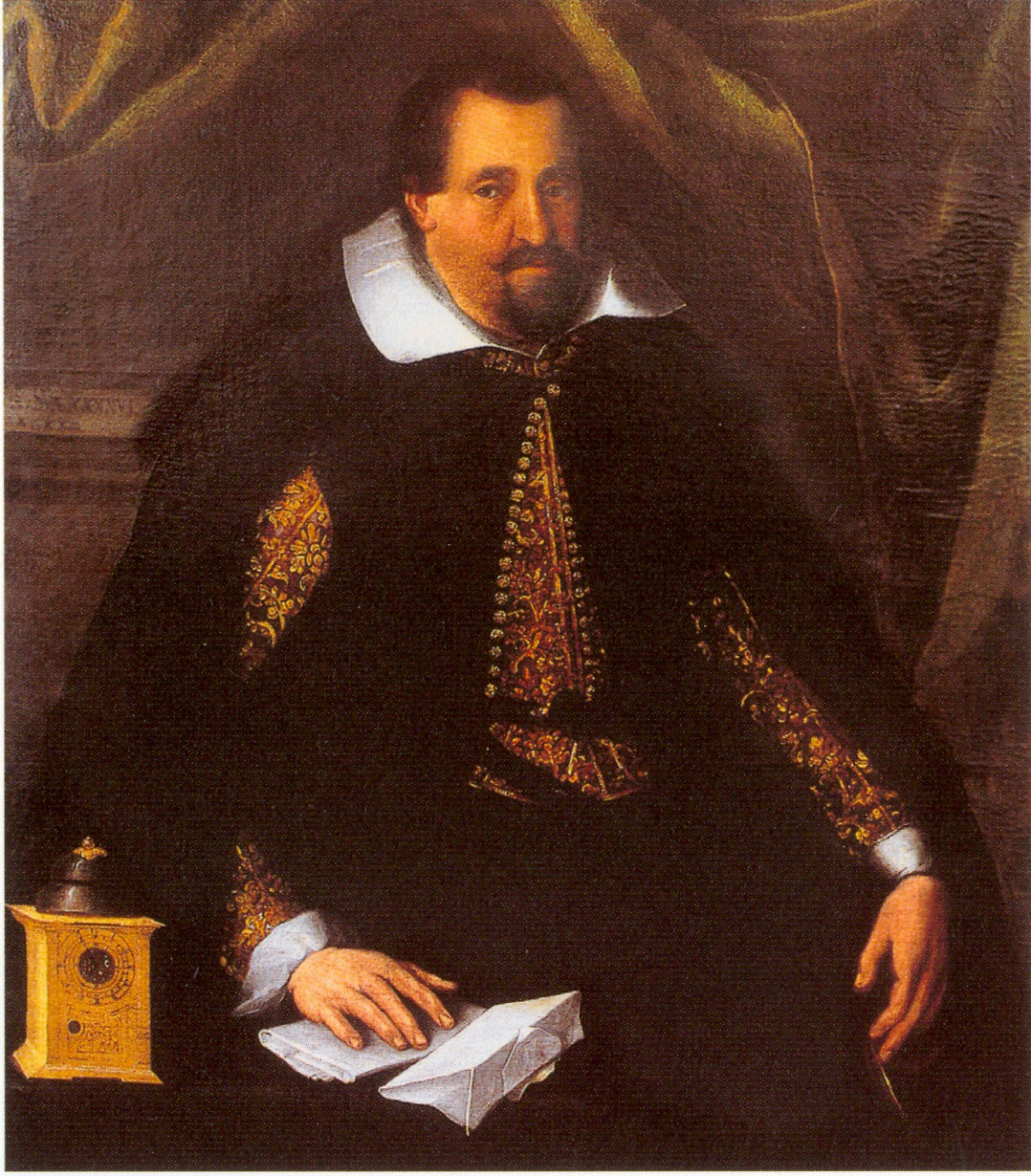
- Anonymous portrait, 1624
- Born: 17 August 1578; Sigmaringen
- Died: 22 March 1638 (aged 59); Munich
- Noble family: House of Hohenzollern
- Spouse: Johanna of Hohenzollern-Hechingen (m. 1602; died 1634)
- Issue: Meinrad I Marie; Euphrosyne Sibylle
- Father: Karl II, Count of Hohenzollern-Sigmaringen
- Mother: Euphrosyne of Oettingen-Wallerstein

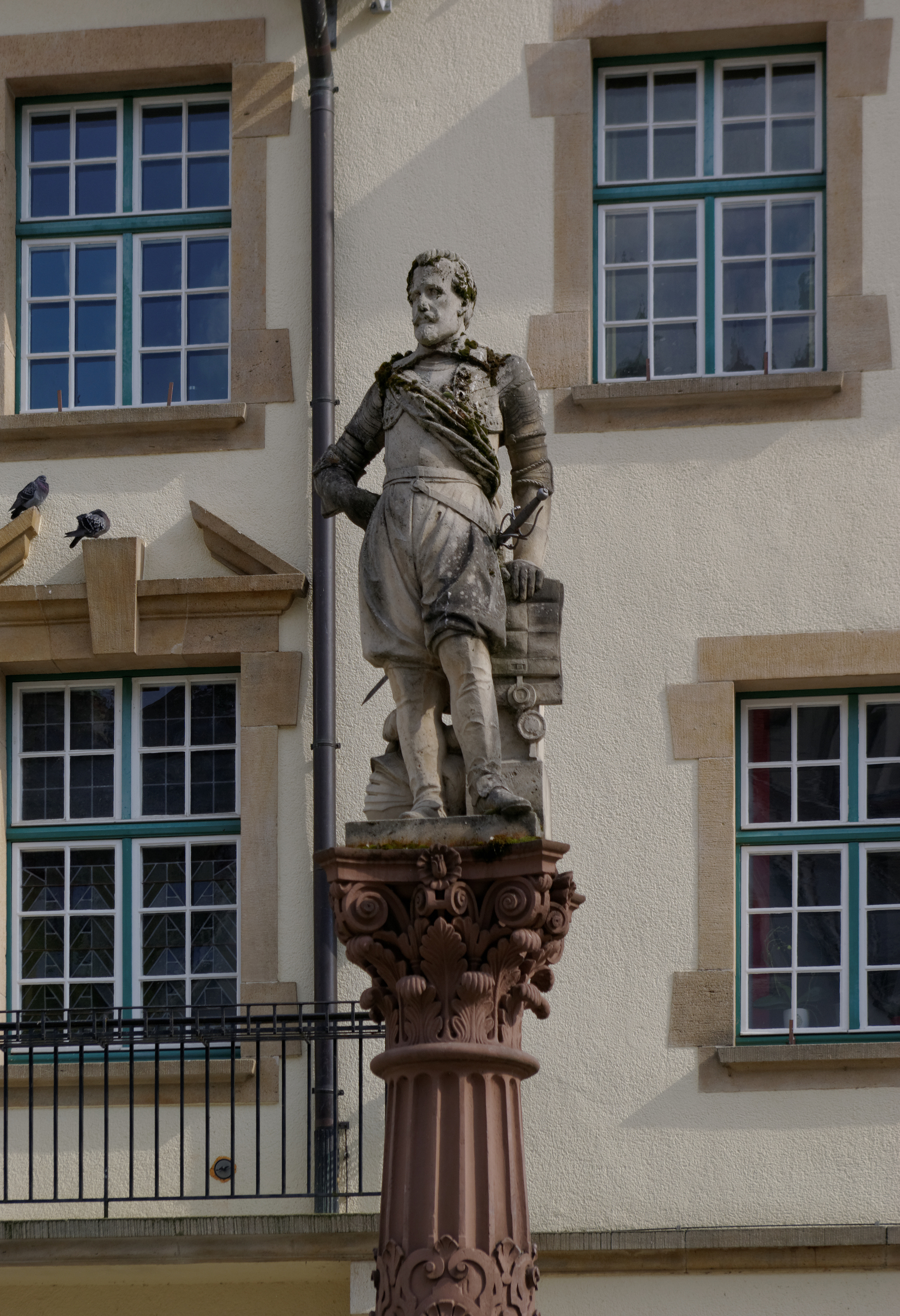
Memorial to Prince Johann of Hohenzollern-Sigmaringen in the market fountain in Sigmaringen, by Hans Baur, 1891.

Prince Johann of Hohenzollern-Sigmaringen (17 August 1578 in Sigmaringen – 22 March 1638 in Munich), was the ruling Count of Hohenzollern-Sigmaringen from 1606 to 1623. He was elevated to the rank of prince in 1623 and so was Prince of Hohenzollern-Sigmaringen from 1623 until his death.

== Life ==
Johann was the eldest surviving son of Count Karl II of Hohenzollern-Sigmaringen (1547–1606), from his marriage to Euphrosyne (1552–1590), the daughter of Count Friedrich V of Oettingen-Wallerstein. He studied law and political sciences at the Universities of Freiburg and Ingolstadt.

On 30 June 1602 in Sigmaringen, Johann married the three years younger Countess Johanna (1581–1634), the daughter of Count Eitel Friedrich IV of Hohenzollern-Hechingen.

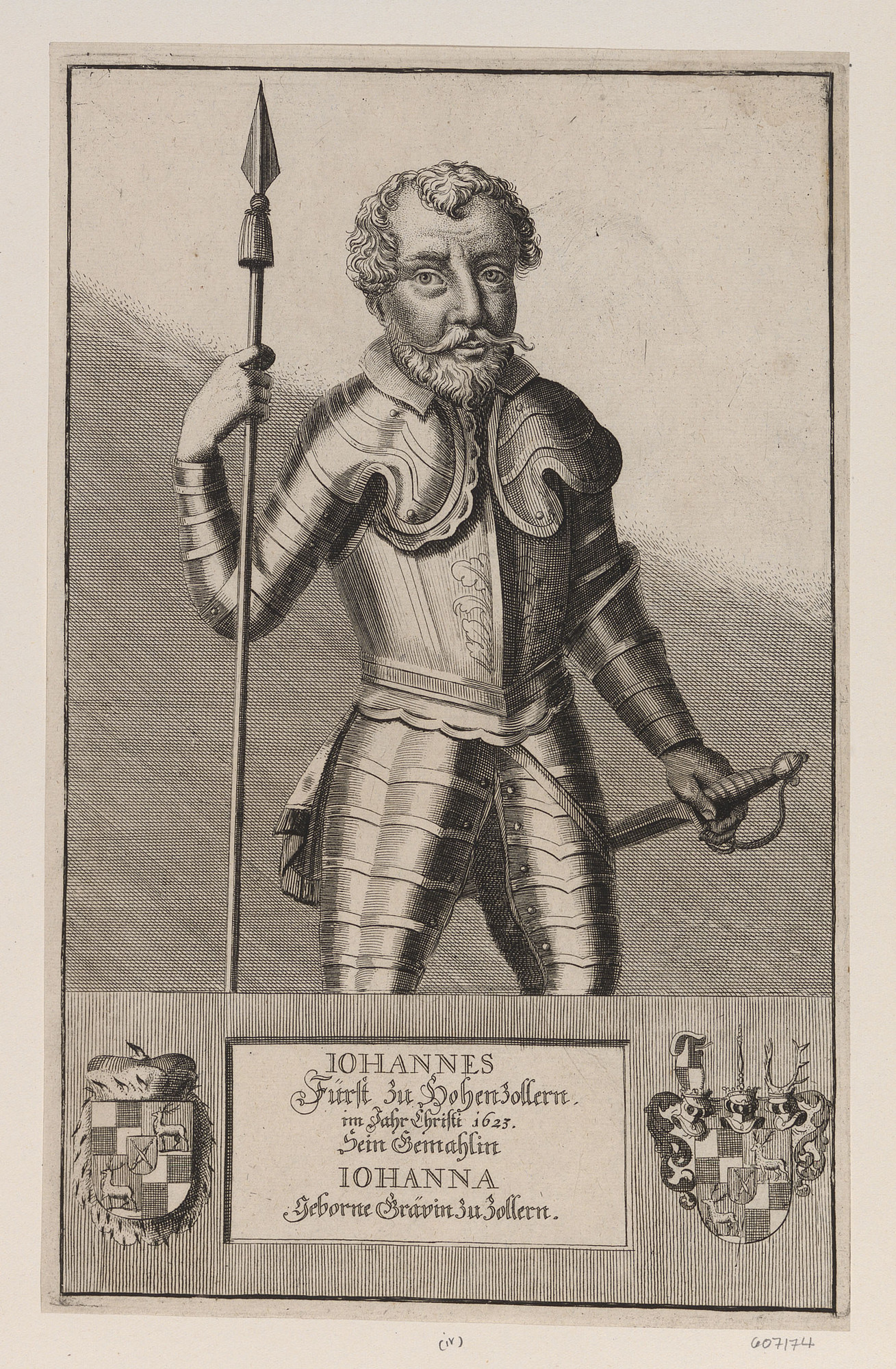
Engraving of Johann

On 8 April 1606, his father died and Johann inherited the county.

Unlike their relatives who ruled the Electorate of Brandenburg, the Sigmaringen branch of the House of Hohenzollern had remained Catholic. However, Sigmaringen was located in the immediate vicinity of the Evangelical Duchy of Württemberg, and thus on a prominent position in the escalating confessional conflict. Johann aligned himself closely to the Duchy of Bavaria, the pioneer of the Catholic League. Johann's son and successor, Meinrad I, was even born in Munich in 1605.

The alliance with Duke Maximilian I of Bavaria, who had been a close friend of the later Emperor Ferdinand since his teens, paid divident in 1623, after Bohemia had been subdued by Bavaria and Bavaria had been elevated to an electorate, Johann and his cousin Johann Georg of Hohenzollern-Hechingen were elevated to Princes.

In 1634, the Hohenzollern-Haigerloch line died out and its territory fell to Johann. His financial situation allowed Johann to make substantial donations to the churches and monasteries in his territory and to further expand his Sigmaringen Castle.

Sigmaringen was affected by the devastation of the Thirty Years' War. In 1632, Sigmaringen Castle was conquered by Sweden. In 1633, it was liberated by imperial troops. However, during the fighting it burned down. Johann fled to Braunau am Inn, together with Duke Maximilian, whom he served as secret councillor. After Johann resigned from Maximilian's service, he received the Lordship of Schwabegg from the Duke. Johann remained in Bavaria and died at the age of 60, in Munich in 1638, four years after his wife had died. Earlier that year, he had been elevated to the rank of Imperial Prince, in other words, he had received a seat in the college of princes in the Imperial Diet.

== Issue ==
From his marriage to Johanna, Johann had the following children:

- Meinrad I (1605–1681), Prince of Hohenzollern-Sigmaringen

married in 1635 to Countess Anna Maria Toerring-Seefeld (1613–1682)

- Marie (1606–1674), married:
  1. in 1625 to Count Paul Andreas of Wolkenstein (1595–1635)

to Baron Rudolph Georg of Haßlang (died after 1676)

- Euphrosyne Sibylle (1607–1636)

married in 1628 to Count Ernst Benno of Wartenberg (1604–1666)

== Ancestry ==
Ancestors of Johann, Prince of Hohenzollern-Sigmaringen

16. Eitel Friedrich II, Count of Hohenzollern
8. Eitel Friedrich III, Count of Hohenzollern
17. Magdalene of Brandenburg
4. Karl I, Count of Hohenzollern
18. Filips Corsselaar van Wittem-Boutersem
9. Johanna van Witthem
19. Johanna van Halewijn
2. Charles II, Count of Hohenzollern-Sigmaringen
20. Christoph I, Margrave of Baden-Baden
10. Ernest, Margrave of Baden-Durlach
21. Ottilie of Katzenelnbogen
5. Anna of Baden-Durlach
22. Frederick I, Margrave of Brandenburg-Ansbach
11. Princess Elisabeth of Brandenburg-Ansbach-Kulmbach
23. Sophia of Poland
1. Johann, Prince of Hohenzollern-Sigmaringen
24. Count Wolfgang I of Oettingen
12. Count Ludwig XV of Oettingen
25. Anna von Waldburg-Waldsee
6. Frederick V, Count of Oettingen-Wallerstein
26. Eitel Friedrich II, Count of Hohenzollern (= 16)
13. Countess Salome of Hohenzollern
27. Magdalene of Brandenburg (= 17)
3. Countess Euphrosyne of Oettingen-Wallerstein
28. Count Joachim of Oettingen-Flochberg
14. Count Martin of Oettingen-Wallerstein
29. Countess Dorothea von Anhalt-Köthen
7. Countess Eufrosine of Oettingen-Wallerstein
30. John IV, Landgrave of Leuchtenberg
15. Countess Anna von Leuchtenberg
31. Margaret of Schwarzburg

Johann, Prince of Hohenzollern-Sigmaringen House of Hohenzollern Born: 17 August 1578 Died: 22 March 1638
Preceded by Karl II as Count of Hohenzollern-Sigmaringen	Prince of Hohenzollern-Sigmaringen; 1606–1638	Succeeded by Meinrad I
Preceded by Karl	Count of Hohenzollern-Haigerloch; 1634–1638	Succeeded by Meinrad I
