= Frederick X of Hohenzollern =

Count of Hohenzollern
- Reign: between 1377 and 1379 – 21 June 1412
- Predecessor: Frederick VIII
- Successor: Frederick XI
- Died: 21 June 1412
- Spouse: Anna of Hohenberg-Nagold
- House: Hohenzollern
- Father: Friedrich IX, Count of Hohenzollern
- Mother: Adelheid of Hohenberg-Wildenburg

Friedrich X, Count of Hohenzollern (died 21 June 1412), nicknamed Friedrich the Younger or the Black Count was a German nobleman. He was a ruling Count of Hohenzollern.

== Life ==
Friedrich was the eldest son of Count Friedrich IX of Hohenzollern from his marriage to Adelheid (d. after 1385), a daughter of Count Burchard V of Hohenberg-Wildenberg.

Friedrich procured an exemption from King Wenceslaus, freeing his county from the jurisdiction of the imperial courts. In 1381, he concluded a military alliance with Duke Leopold III of Austria. In 1386, Friedrich X fought on the Austrian side in the Battle of Sempach. He later mediated between Austria and the free imperial cities in Swabia and Franconia.

In 1408, Friedrich became the senior member of the House of Hohenzollern. In this rôle, he looked after the internal affairs of the dynasty and kept the peace between its various branches.

Friedrich married Anna (d. 1421), a daughter of Count Burchard IX of Hohenberg-Nagold. The marriage remained childless. Consequently, the line of "Black Counts" founded by his father, died out with Friedrich's death. He bequeathed most of his estate to his cousin Friedrich XII. Anna, Friedrich's widow, became prioress of Reuthin.

Frederick X of Hohenzollern House of Hohenzollern Born: before 1377 Died: 21 June 1412
Preceded by Friedrich IX	Count of Hohenzollern; 1377/9 – 1412	Succeeded by Friedrich XII
