= Frederick VI =

Frederick VI or Friedrich VI may refer to:

- Frederick VI, Duke of Swabia (1167–1191)
- Frederick VI, Count of Zollern (died 1298)
- Frederick VI, Margrave of Baden-Durlach (1617–1677)
- Frederick VI, Landgrave of Hesse-Homburg (1769–1829)
- Frederick VI of Denmark (1768–1839), King of Denmark and Norway
