= Frederick V =

Frederick V or Friedrich V may refer to:

- Frederick V, Duke of Swabia (1164–1170)
- Frederick V, Count of Zollern (d.1289)
- Frederick V, Burgrave of Nuremberg (c. 1333–1398), German noble
- Frederick V of Austria (1415–1493), or Frederick III, Holy Roman Emperor
- Frederick I, Margrave of Brandenburg-Ansbach (1460–1536), or Friedrich V, Margrave von Brandenburg-Ansbach-Bayreuth
- Frederick V, Margrave of Baden-Durlach (1594–1659)
- Frederick V of the Palatinate (1596–1632), or Friedrich V von der Pfalz, Elector Palatine
- Frederick V of Denmark (1723–1766), king of Denmark and Norway
- Frederick V, Landgrave of Hesse-Homburg (1748–1820)
