= Meinrad I of Hohenzollern-Sigmaringen =

Prince of Hohenzollern-Sigmaringen (1638-1681)

Meinrad I, Prince of Hohenzollern-Sigmaringen
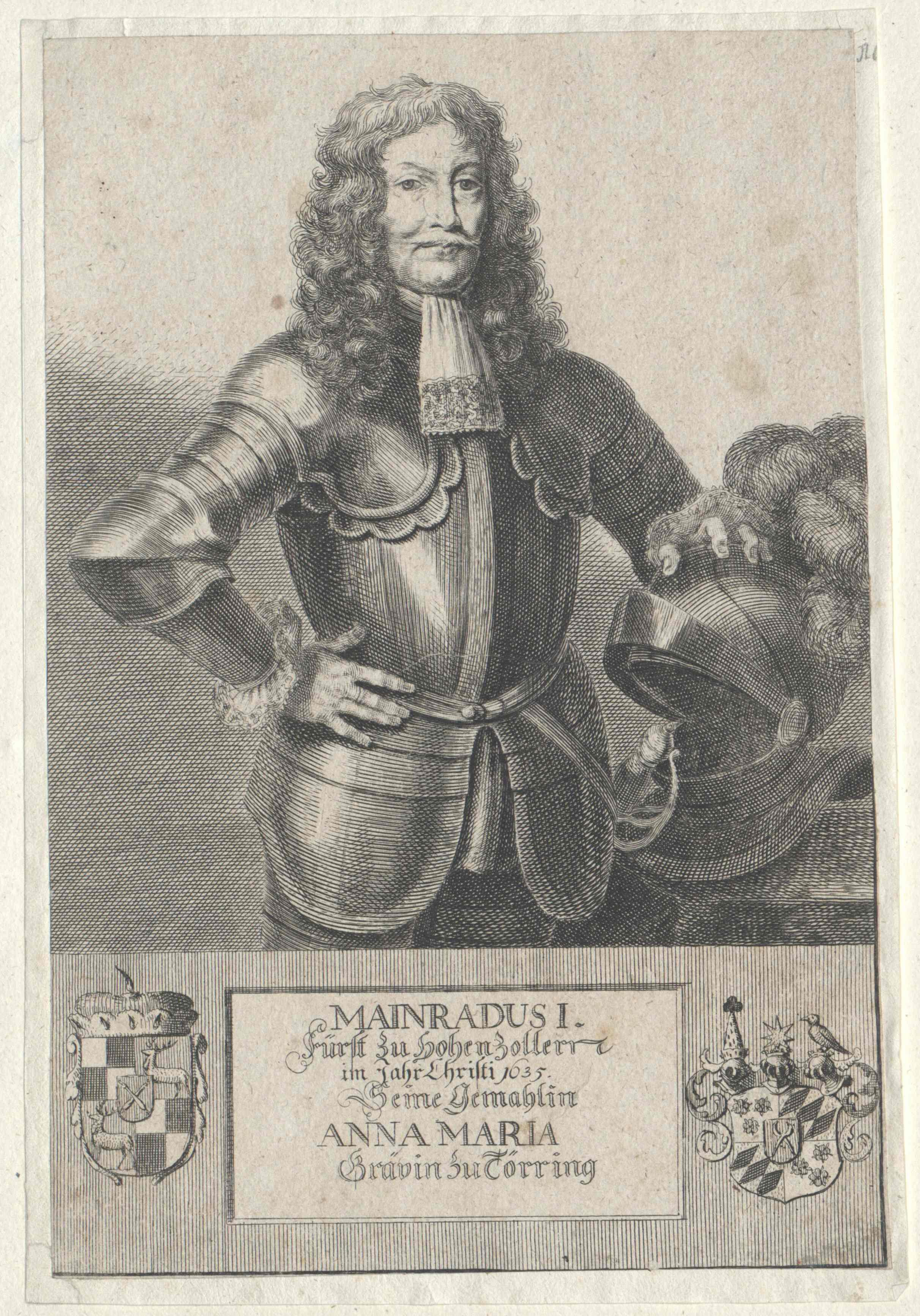
- Engraving of Meinrad I, 1635
- Born: 1605; Munich
- Died: 30 January 1681; Sigmaringen
- Noble family: House of Hohenzollern
- Spouse: Anna Marie of Törring at Seefeld
- Father: Johann, Prince of Hohenzollern-Sigmaringen
- Mother: Johanna of Hohenzollern-Hechingen

Meinrad I of Hohenzollern-Sigmaringen (1605 in Munich – 30 January 1681 in Sigmaringen) was Prince of Hohenzollern-Sigmaringen from 1638 until his death.

== Life ==
Meinrad I was the son of Johann, Prince of Hohenzollern-Sigmaringen (1578–1638) and Countess Johanna of Hohenzollern-Hechingen (1581–1634), daughter of Eitel Friedrich IV of Hohenzollern. The Prince was born in Munich, where his father as president acted of the Privy Council for Duke Maximilian I of Bavaria.

The Thirty Years' War had a major influence on his life. When he was 17, he served in the Bavarian army. He served under Tilly in the Battle of Lutter. He later fought under Pappenheim against Protestant rebels in Austria. He later became an influential advisor of the Duke of Bavaria.

When he inherited Hohenzollern-Sigmaringen in 1638, the principality had been ravaged and depleted by the war. He commissioned the renowned architect Michael Beer from Vorarlberg to rebuild and modernize the castles at Sigmaringen and Haigerloch. The Swedes had occupied Sigmaringen Castle in 1633. In 1633, a Catholic army Under general Gustav Horn had retook the castle. However, during the battle the eastern wing had been destroyed by fire. In 1658 and 1659, Meinrad had the east wing rebuilt and combined the two buildings on the east side, which had been built by the Counts of Werdenberg. He paid this construction work out of his own pocket, using funds he had inherited from his father as well as his wife's fortune.

He died on 30 January 1681. After his death, the county was divided, inaccordance with the provisions of Meinrad's will: his eldest son Maximilian I inherited Hohenzollern-Sigmaringen; his youngest son Franz Anton inherited Hohenzollern-Haigerloch.

== Marriage and descendants ==
Meinrad married on 7 May 1635 to Anna Marie (1613 – 12 February 1682), the daughter of Baron Ferdinand of Törring at Seefeld, with whom he had nineteen children:

- Maximilian I (20 January 1636 – 13 August 1689), inherited Hohenzollern-Sigmaringen.
- Johann Karl (17 February 1637 – April 1637).
- Maria Anna (17 March 1638 – 27 August 1638).
- Franz Ferdinand (27 November 1639 – 12 August 1662), killed in a hunting accident
- Maria Johanna (28 March 1640 – 12 November 1707), Prioress of Inzigkofen Abbey.
- Meinrad (9 April 1641 – 25 April 1642).
- Christoph (born and died 26 January 1642).
- Maria Magdalena (5 January 1643 – 27 October 1663).
- Ignaz (stillborn, 22 December 1643).
- Maria Menodora (10 December 1644 – 3 December 1664), a nun in Holz.
- Maria Katharina (born and died 24 November 1645).
- Maria Theresa (20 March 1647 – June 1647).
- Johann Meinrad (9 February 1648 – 11 February 1648).
- Maria Franziska (17 May 1649 – 5 September 1712), also Prioress of Inzigkofen Abbey.
- Stillborn son (6 August 1650).
- Johann Felix (30 August 1651 – 8 September 1651).
- Anna Maria (26 August 1654 – 27 August 1678), married on 13 July 1672 to Count Anton Eusebius of Koenigsegg-Aulendorf.
- Stillborn son (22 August 1655)
- Franz Anton (2 December 1657 – 14 October 1702), inherited Hohenzollern-Haigerloch, killed in action.

== Ancestry ==
Ancestors of Meinrad I of Hohenzollern-Sigmaringen

16. Eitel Friedrich III, Count of Hohenzollern
8. Karl I, Count of Hohenzollern
17. Johanna van Witthem
4. Charles II, Count of Hohenzollern-Sigmaringen
18. Ernest, Margrave of Baden-Durlach
9. Anna of Baden-Durlach
19. Princess Elisabeth of Brandenburg-Ansbach-Kulmbach
2. Johann, Prince of Hohenzollern-Sigmaringen
20. Count Ludwig XV of Oettingen
10. Frederick V, Count of Oettingen-Wallerstein
21. Countess Salome of Hohenzollern
5. Countess Euphrosyne of Oettingen-Wallerstein
22. Count Martin of Oettingen-Wallerstein
11. Countess Eufrosine of Oettingen-Wallerstein
23. Countess Anna von Leuchtenberg
1. Meinrad I, Prince of Hohenzollern-Sigmaringen
24. Eitel Friedrich III, Count of Hohenzollern (= 16)
12. Karl I, Count of Hohenzollern (= 8)
25. Johanna van Witthem (= 17)
6. Eitel Friedrich IV, Count of Hohenzollern
26. Ernest, Margrave of Baden-Durlach (= 18)
13. Anna of Baden-Durlach (= 9)
27. Princess Elisabeth of Brandenburg-Ansbach-Kulmbach (= 19)
3. Countess Johanna of Hohenzollern-Hechingen
28. Count Johann Werner of Zimmern the Younger
14. Count Froben Christoph of Zimmern
29. Katharina of Erbach
7. Countess Sibylle of Zimmern
30. Wilhelm IV of Eberstein
15. Kunigunde of Eberstein
31. Johanna of Hanau-Lichtenberg

== See also ==
- House of Hohenzollern

Meinrad I of Hohenzollern-Sigmaringen House of Hohenzollern Born: 1605 Died: 30 January 1681
Preceded by Johann	Prince of Hohenzollern-Sigmaringen; 1638–1681	Succeeded by Maximilian I
Preceded by Johann	Count of Hohenzollern-Haigerloch; 1638–1681	Succeeded by Franz Anton
