= Frederick XII of Hohenzollern =

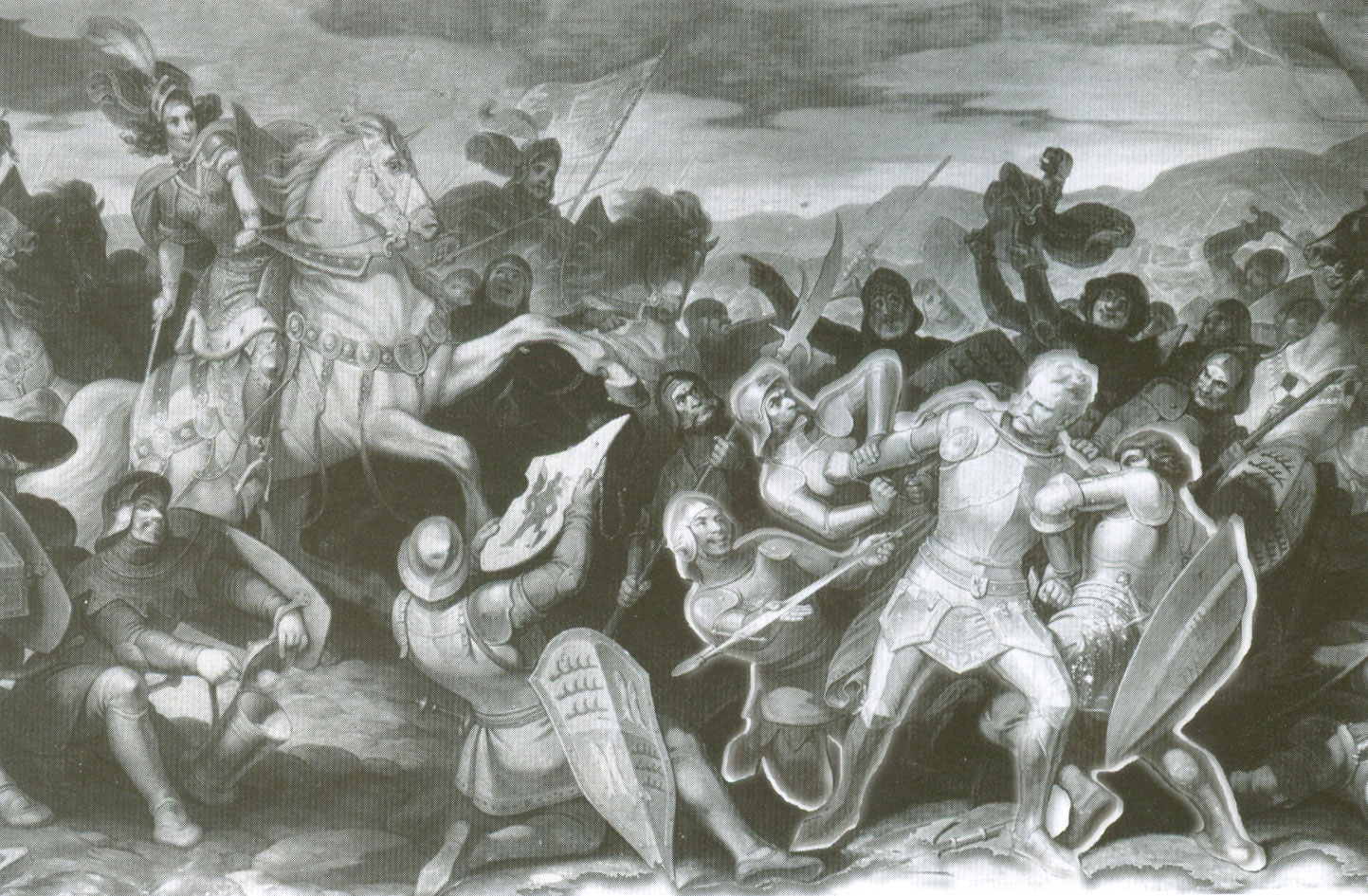
- The capture of Friedrich the Oettinger, in a 19th century propagandistic representation from Württemberg

Count of Hohenzollern
- Reign: 1401–1426
- Predecessor: Frederick XI
- Successor: Eitel Friedrich I
- Born: before 1401
- Died: 1443
- Spouse: Anna of Sulz
- House: House of Hohenzollern
- Father: Friedrich XI, Count of Hohenzollern
- Mother: Adelheid of Fürstenberg-Zindelstein

Friedrich XII, Count of Hohenzollern, nickname Friedrich the Oettinger (before 1401 – 1443) was a German nobleman. He was a member of the Swabian branch of the House of Hohenzollern. His father was Friedrich XI, Count of Hohenzollern; his younger brother and rival was Eitel Friedrich I, Count of Hohenzollern.

== Life ==
Friedrich was confronted with the situation that the Swabian line of the House of Hohenzollern had lost much of its importance, because they had had to sell some of their territory, and divide the remaining territory among a growing number of ruling counts. The division of 1402 had reinforced this problem. Friedrich XI's territory had been divided between Friedrich XII and his brother Eitel Friedrich I. Hohenzollern Castle, the town of Hechingen and the mill were still owned jointly. The brothers constantly quarreled over their inheritance. Friedrich was in financial difficulties, and selling even more territory to the House of Württemberg would not solve his problem. The Counts of Hohenzollern wanted to remain independent from Württemberg.

The imperial court in Rottweil pronounced an imperial ban over Friedrich XII in 1418, and he had to flee.

The conflict with Eitel Friedrich I over Hohenzollern Castle escalated when in 1422 Friedrich XII began a feud against the free imperial city of Rottweil. The Swabian League of Cities allied with Eitel Friedrich I and the Counts of Württemberg against Friedrich XII. After they had besieged Hohenzollern castle for ten months, Friedrich XII had to surrender in 1423. Emperor Sigismund ordered the castle to be destroyed as a punishment, and forbade Friedrich to build it up again.

In 1426, Friedrich XII and Eitel Friedrich I reconciled their differences. However, in 1428 or 1429, Henriette, Countess of Montbéliard took Friedrich XII prisoner. He remained in her custody until 1440.

When Eitel Friedrich I died in 1439, Friedrich XII claimed his inheritance, as did his nephew Jobst Nikolaus I, who was Eitel Friedrich's eldest son.

Friedrich XII died in childless in 1443 while on a journey to the Holy Land. His widow, Anna of Sulz, had to turn to the Counts of Württemberg for financial support, as they held most of the former Hohenzollern possessions, and the family was in serious financial difficulties.

Frederick XII of Hohenzollern House of Hohenzollern Born: before 1401 Died: 1443
Preceded by Friedrich XI	Count of Hohenzollern	Succeeded by Jobst Nikolaus I
