= Frederick VII =

Frederick VII or Friedrich VII may refer to:

- Frederick VII, Count of Zollern (d. after 6 October 1309)
- Frederick VII, Count of Toggenburg (ca. 1370 – 1436)
- Frederick VII, Margrave of Baden-Durlach (1647–1709)
- Frederick VII of Denmark (1808–1863)
