= Frederick IX =

Frederick IX, Friedrich IX or Frederik IX may refer to:

- Frederick IX, Count of Hohenzollern (d. between 1377 and 1379)
- Frederick IX, Margrave of Brandenburg (1588–1611)
- Frederik IX, King of Denmark (1899–1972)
  - Frederik IX Bridge
