= Frederick XI of Hohenzollern =

Count of Hohenzollern
- Reign: 1377–1401
- Predecessor: Frederick IX
- Successor: Frederick XII
- Died: 26 November 1401
- Burial: Stetten Abbey
- Spouse: Adelheid of Fürstenberg-Zindelstein
- Issue: Friedrich XII; Eitel Friedrich I; Anna; Friedrich, canon in Strasbourg; Friedrich, bishop of Constance; Friedrich, monk
- House: House of Hohenzollern
- Father: Friedrich of Strasbourg
- Mother: Margaret of Hohenburg-Wildenburg

Friedrich XI, Count of Hohenzollern (died 26 November 1401), nicknamed Friedrich the Elder was a German nobleman. He was a member of the House of Hohenzollern and a ruling Count of Hohenzollern-Hechingen.

== Life ==
Friedrich was the younger son of Count Friedrich of Strasbourg, from his marriage to Margaret, the daughter of Count Burchard V of Hohenberg-Wildberg.

After the death of Friedrich IX, Friedrich XI became the senior member of the House of Hohenzollern. As such, he was the Vogt of Stetten Abbey.

He was a member of the Lion League, which joined the Swabian League of Cities in 1382. When the latter clashed with Count Eberhard II of Württemberg, Friedrich XI managed to break off the services he had promised to Count Eberhard.

In 1388, he regained the town of Hechingen, which bishop Friedrich of Strasbourg had held. After a town fire in 1401, he granted the town a letter of liberty.

Friedrich XI died in 1401, and was buried in the Hohenzollern crypt in Stetten Abbey.

== Marriage and issue ==
Before 12 January 1377, Friedrich XI married Adelheid (d. 1413), a daughter of Count Hugo of Fürstenberg-Zindelstein. Her brother Johann was the last Count of Fürstenberg-Haslah. Johann died childless in the Battle of Sempach of 1386, and Friedrich XI inherited Bräunlingen from him, which gave rise to a lengthy dispute with the main line of the Fürstenberg family.

From his marriage with Adelheid, Friedrich had the following children:

- Friedrich XII (d. 1443), Count of Hohenzollern, married in 1407 Anna of Sulz (d. 1438)
- Eitel Friedrich I (d. 1439), Count of Hohenzollern, married in 1432 to Ursula Razüns (d. 1477). He had issue:
  - Jobst Nikolaus I, Count of Hohenzollern
- Anna, a nun
- Friedrich, a canon in Strasbourg
- Friedrich (d. 1436), Bishop of Constance as Friedrich III
- Friedrich, a monk

== Ancestry ==
Ancestors of Frederick XI of Hohenzollern

16. Frederick V, Count of Zollern
8. Frederick VI, Count of Zollern
17. Udilhild of Dillingen
4. Frederick VIII, Count of Zollern
18. Rudolf I, Margrave of Baden-Baden
9. Kunigunde of Baden
19. Kunigunde of Eberstein
2. Count Friedrich of Strasbourg
5. (?)
1. Frederick XI, Count of Hohenzollern
24. Count Burchard V of Hohenberg
12. Count Burchard VI of Hohenberg-Nagold-Haigerloch
25. Mechtild von Tübingen
6. Count Burchard V. of Hohenberg-Wildberg
26. Hugo IV of Tübingen-Blauberen
13. Liutgard von Tübingen
27. Beatrix von Eberstein
3. Countess Margaret of Hohenburg-Wildenburg
7. Adelheid of Vaihingen (?)

Frederick XI of Hohenzollern House of Hohenzollern Died: 26 November 1401
Preceded by Friedrich	Count of Hohenzollern-Hechingen; 1379–1401	Succeeded by Friedrich XII
