= Frederick IX of Hohenzollern =

Count of Hohenzollern
- Reign: 1333 – between 1377 and 1379
- Predecessor: Frederick VII
- Successor: Frederick X
- Died: between 1377 and 1379
- Spouse: Adelheid of Hohenberg-Wildenberg
- Issue: Friedrich X; Adelheid; Friedrich "Easter Sunday" I; Anna; Sophia
- House: Hohenzollern
- Father: Friedrich VIII, Count of Zollern

Friedrich IX, Count of Hohenzollern (died between 1377 and 1379), nicknamed "Fredrick the Old" or "the Black Count", was a German nobleman. He was the ruling count of Hohenzollern from 1339 until his death.

== Life ==
He was the second son of Count Friedrich VIII. In 1339, he succeeded his older brother Fritzli II as Count of Hohenzollern.

On 27 July 1342, he closed a treaty of agnatic seniority with the Zollern-Schalksburg line, in which the senior of the two counts should decide who would be the next holder of the original fief of Zollern. As Friedrich commanded a larger military power, he became a captain of the Lion League, an important organisation of Swabian noblemen.

In 1344, Friedrich IX divided the inheritance with his younger brother Friedrich of Strasbourg. Friedrich IX founded the "Black Count" line, which ended with the death of his son Friedrich X in 1412. In 1412, the Strasbourg line founded by his brother inherited the county; they were later raised to Princes of Hohenzollern.

== Marriage and issue ==
In 1341 Fredrick IX married Adelheid (d. after 1385), a daughter of Count Burchard V of Hohenberg-Wildenberg, with whom he had the following children:

- Friedrich X, the younger Black Count (d. 1412), Count of Hohenzollern, married Anna of Hohenberg (d. 1421)
- Adelheid (d. 1415), married Johann of Stralenberg (d. 1408)
- Friedrich "Easter Sunday" III (d. 1407/10)
- Anna (d. 1418), a nun in Königsfeld
- Sophia (d. 1418), a nun in Stetten

== Footnotes ==
Frederick IX of Hohenzollern House of Hohenzollern Born: before 1339 Died: between 1377 and 1379
Preceded by Friedrich VIII as Count of Zollern	Count of Hohenzollern; 1333–1377	Succeeded by Friedrich X
