= Eitel Friedrich III of Hohenzollern =

Count of Hohenzollern from 1512 until his death (1494–1525)

Eitel Friedrich III, Count of Hohenzollern
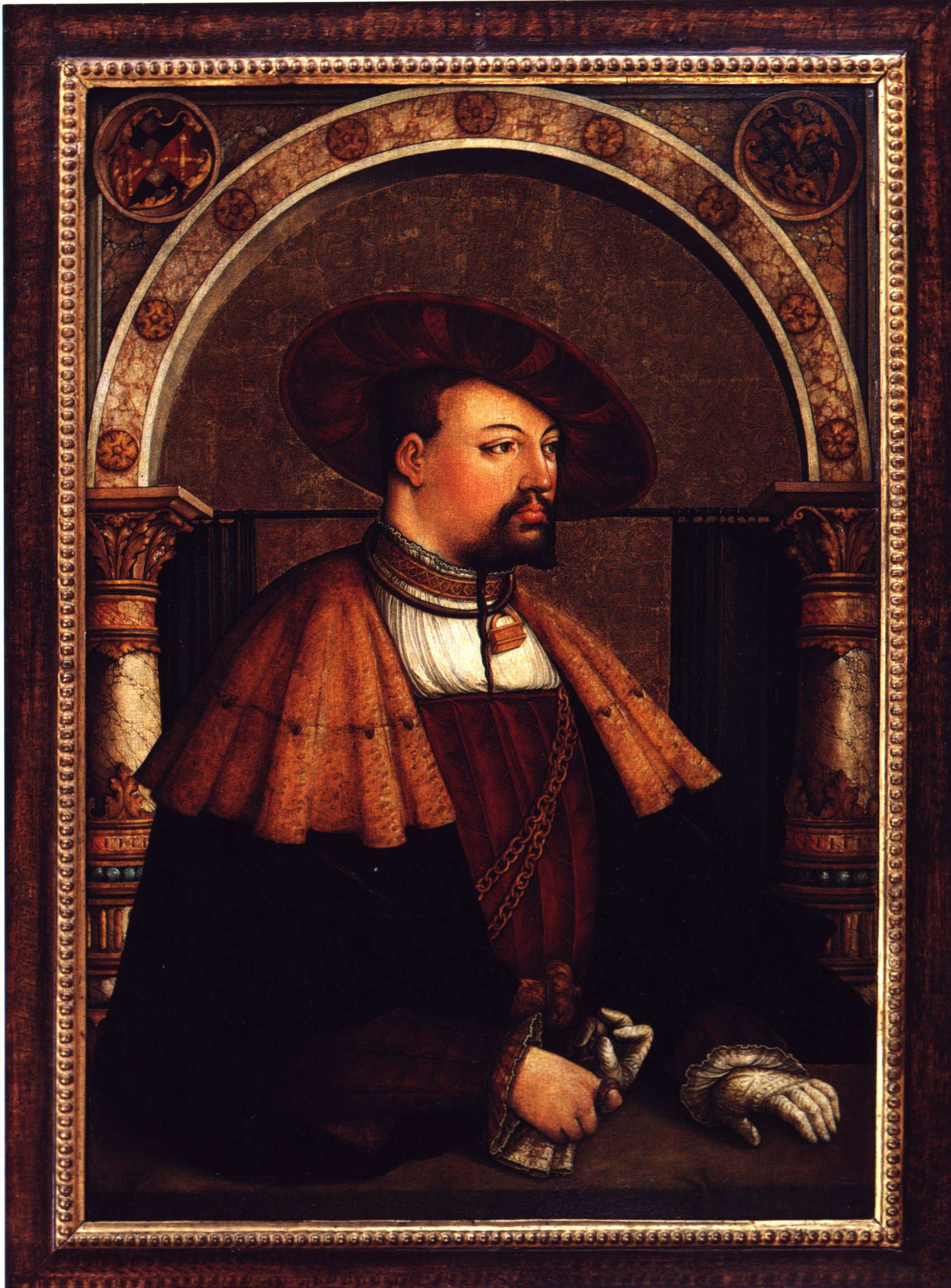
- Portrait Eitel Friedrich III by Joseph Weiß, on display in the Museum of Sigmaringen
- Born: 1494
- Died: 15 January 1525; Pavia
- Buried: Cathedral of Pavia
- Noble family: House of Hohenzollern
- Spouse: Johanna of Witthem
- Father: Eitel Friedrich II, Count of Hohenzollern
- Mother: Magdalena of Brandenburg

Eitel Friedrich III, Count of Hohenzollern (1494 – 15 January 1525 in Pavia) was Count of County of Hohenzollern from 1512 until his death.

== Life ==
Eitel Friedrich was a son of Count Eitel Friedrich II (1452–1512) from his marriage to Magdalena (1460 -1496), the daughter of Margrave Friedrich of Altmark. Eitel Friedrich succeeded his father as Count of Hohenzollern in 1512.

In 1515, he married Johanna of Witthem (d. 1544), the daughter of Philip, Lord of Beersel and Boutersem.

Eitel Friedrich III was top councillor and great chamberlain to Emperor Maximilian I, which demonstrates that he, like his father before him, had excellent relations with the Habsburgs. He was also Imperial Archchamberlain and captain of the Lordship of Hohenberg.

He died in Pavia in 1525; he may have been poisoned. He was in Pavia to serve as captain of the Landsknecht regiment. He was buried in the Basilica of San Pietro in Ciel d'Oro of Pavia.

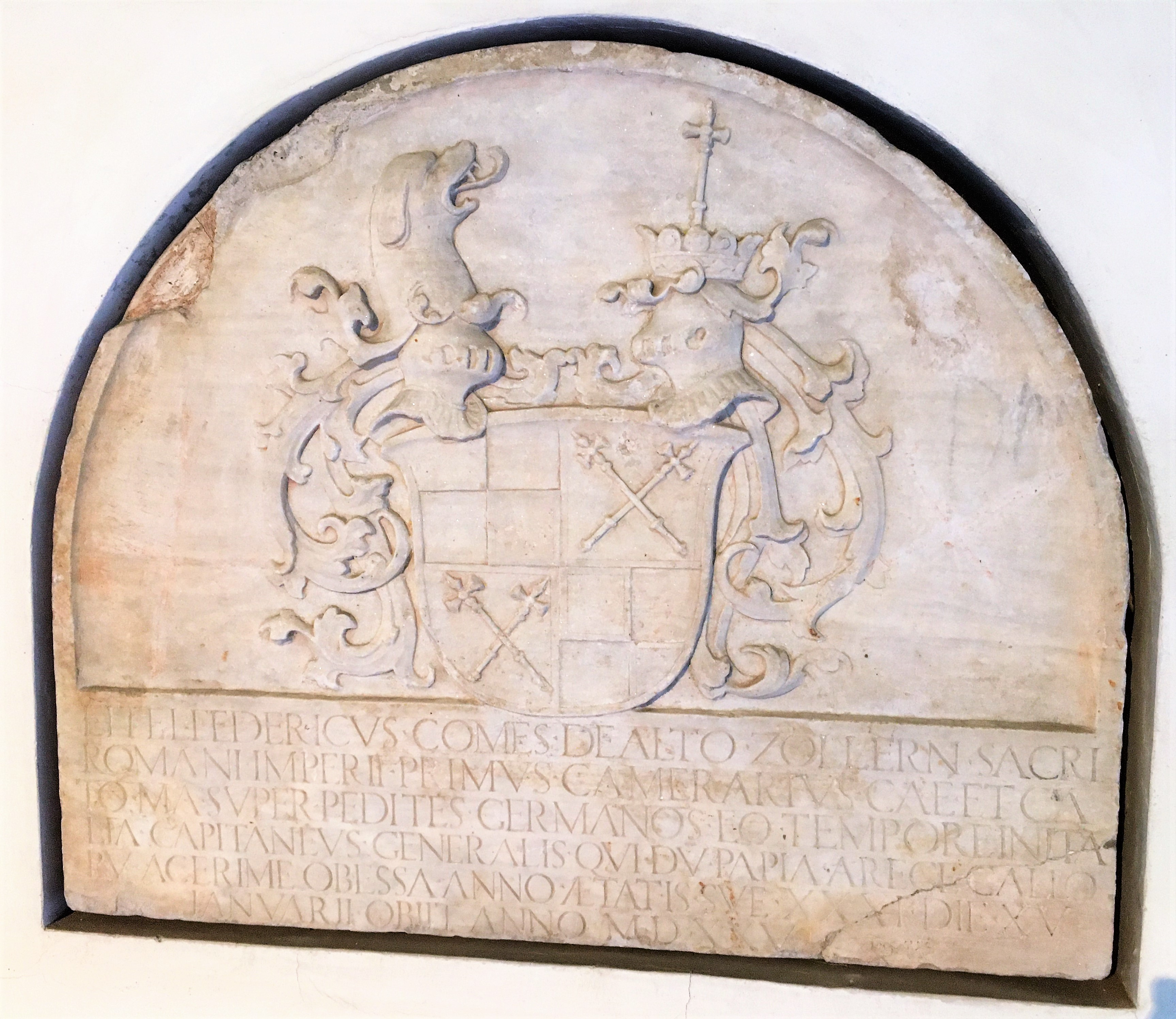
Gravestone of Eitel Friedrich III, Pavia, Musei Civici.

== Issue ==
His marriage Eitel Friedrich had the following children:

- Karl I (1516–1576), his successor as Count of Hohenzollern, married in 1537 to Margravine Anna of Baden-Durlach (1512–1579)
- Ferfried (died young)
- Anna (d. 1574)
- Margaret (died young)
- Eitel Friedrich, (d. 1544), fell during the Siege of St. Dizier
- Felix Friedrich (d. 1550)
- Johanna (d. 1550), married in 1539 to Baron James III, Seneschal of Waldburg-Trauchburg (1512–1542)

== Ancestry ==
Ancestors of Eitel Friedrich III of Hohenzollern

16. Frederick XI, Count of Hohenzollern
8. Eitel Friedrich I, Count of Hohenzollern
17. Adelheid of Fürstenberg-Zindelstein
4. Jobst Nikolaus I, Count of Hohenzollern
18. Heinrich V. of Rhäzüns
9. Ursula of Rhäzüns
19. Verena of Stoffeln
2. Eitel Friedrich II, Count of Hohenzollern
20. Eberhard III, Count of Werdenberg-Sargans
10. John IV, Count of Werdenberg-Sargans
21. Anna of Zimmern
5. Countess Agnes of Werdenberg-Heiligenberg
22. Eberhard III, Count of Württemberg
11. Elisabeth of Württemberg
23. Elisabeth of Nuremberg
1. Eitel Friedrich III, Count of Hohenzollern
24. Frederick V, Burgrave of Nuremberg
12. Frederick I, Elector of Brandenburg
25. Elisabeth of Meissen
6. Frederick III of Brandenburg
26. Frederick, Duke of Bavaria
13. Elisabeth of Bavaria
27. Maddalena Visconti
3. Magdalene of Brandenburg
28. Wartislaw VIII, Duke of Pomerania
14. Barnim VIII, Duke of Pomerania
29. Agnes of Saxe-Lauenburg
7. Princess Agnes of Pomerania-Wolgast
30. Julius of Wunstorf
15. Anna of Wunstorf
31. Jutta of Diepholz

Eitel Friedrich III of Hohenzollern House of Hohenzollern Born: 1494
Preceded by Eitel Friedrich II	Count of Hohenzollern; 1512–1525	Succeeded by Karl I
