= Bernhard Eitel =

German earth scientist and geographer

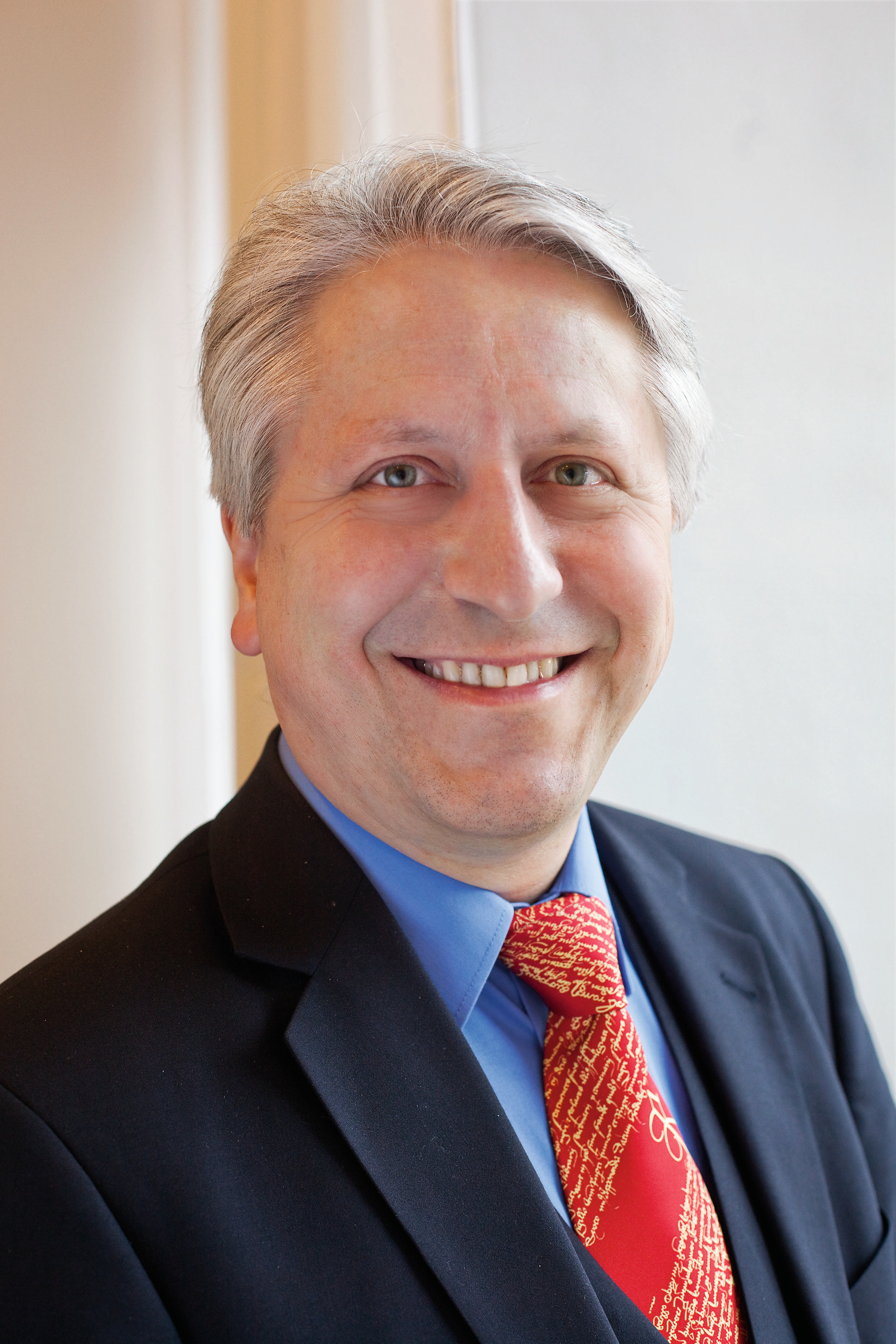
Bernhard Eitel (2009)

Bernhard Eitel (born 31 August 1959) is a German earth scientist and geographer.

Eitel was born in Baden. From 1 October 2007 to 30 September 2023, he was the Rector of Heidelberg University.

== See also ==
- Sustainable Development
