= Frederick of Altmark =

Margrave of Brandenburg, Lord of the Altmark

Frederick III of Brandenburg
- Born: c. 1424
- Died: 6 October 1463; Tangermünde
- Buried: St. George Church in Arneburg
- Noble family: House of Hohenzollern
- Spouse: Agnes of Pomerania
- Father: Frederick I, Elector of Brandenburg
- Mother: Elizabeth of Bavaria-Landshut

Frederick III of Brandenburg, nicknamed the Fat, also the Younger (born: c. 1424; died: 6 October 1463 in Tangermünde) was Margrave of Brandenburg and Lord of the Altmark.

== Life ==
Frederick was the youngest son of the Elector Frederick I of Brandenburg (1371–1440) from his marriage to Elizabeth (1383–1442 ), daughter of the Duke Frederick of Bavaria-Landshut.

His father's testament, stipulated that Frederick should rule the Margraviate of Brandenburg jointly with his older brother Frederick Irontooth, who also acted as his guardian from 1440 onwards, until at least 1456. Frederick III, however, began urging for more independence in 1445. He was supported by his brothers John and Albert Achilles. In 1447, Frederick received his own territory, consisting of the Altmark and Prignitz, under the sovereignty of Electoral Brandenburg. He fostered the influx of Jews into his territory, after his brother had driven them out of his margraviate in 1446. Frederick III resided in Tangermünde, Salzwedel and Arneburg. He neglected the business of government in such a way that his brother found it necessary in 1459 to intervene militarily against the intrigues in the country.

Since Frederick died without male heirs, the Altmark and Priegnitz fell back to the Electorate of Brandenburg when he died in 1463. Frederick was buried in the Church of St. George in Arneburg. During the Thirty Years' War his tomb was looted and destroyed. His remains were recovered and buried in Berlin

== Marriage and issue ==
Frederick married on 9 February 1449 in Tangermünde to Agnes (1436–1512), a daughter of the Duke Barnim VIII of Pomerania, with whom he had one daughter:

- Magdalena (1460–1496), married in 1482 to Count Eitel Frederick II of Hohenzollern (1452-1512)
