= Frederick VII of Zollern =

Count of Zollern
- Reign: 4 May 1298 – 6 October 1309
- Predecessor: Frederick VI
- Successor: Frederick VIII (as Count of Hohenzollern)
- Died: after 6 October 1309
- Spouse: Euphemia of Hohenberg-Rotenburg
- Issue: Fritzli; Albrecht
- House: Hohenzollern
- Father: Friedrich VI, Count of Zollern
- Mother: Kunigunde of Baden

Friedrich VII, Count of Zollern (died after 6 October 1309) was a German nobleman. He was the ruling Count of Zollern from 1298 until his death.

== Life ==
He was the elder son of Count Friedrich VI from his marriage with Kunigunde (1265–1310), a daughter of Rudolf I of Baden.

In 1298, he married Euphemia (d. 1333), a daughter of Count Albrecht II of Hohenberg-Rotenburg. This marriage had been mediated by Emperor Rudolf I himself, and brought an end to many years of rivalry between the Swabian Counts of Zollern and Hohenberg.

Friedrich VII died after 6 October 1309. After his death, the County of Zollern was inherited by his younger brother Friedrich VIII.

== Issue ==
Friedrich and Euphemia had two sons:

- Fritzli I (d. 1313), Lord of Zollern
- Albrecht (d. 1320), married Guta of Gutenstein

Frederick VII of Zollern House of Hohenzollern Died: after 6 October 1309
Preceded by Friedrich VI	Count of Zollern; 1298–1309	Succeeded by Friedrich VIII
