= SS Prinz Eitel Friedrich =

SS Prinz Eitel Friedrich may refer to one of the following ships named for Prince Eitel Friedrich of Prussia:

- SS Otsego, originally the Hamburg America Line passenger liner SS Prinz Eitel Friedrich 1901–1917; seized by the United States and operated as United States Navy transport USS Otsego (ID-1628) during World War I; served as USAT Otsego during World War II; transferred to Soviet Union as Ural in 1945; fate unknown
- SS Prinz Eitel Friedrich (1904), a North German Lloyd passenger liner, 1904–1917; served as a merchant raider, 1914–1917; seized by the United States and operated as United States Navy transport and cruiser USS DeKalb (ID-3010); in European passenger service as Mount Clay 1921–1925; laid up, 1925; scrapped, 1934
