= Jobst Nikolaus I of Hohenzollern =

German nobleman (1433–1488)

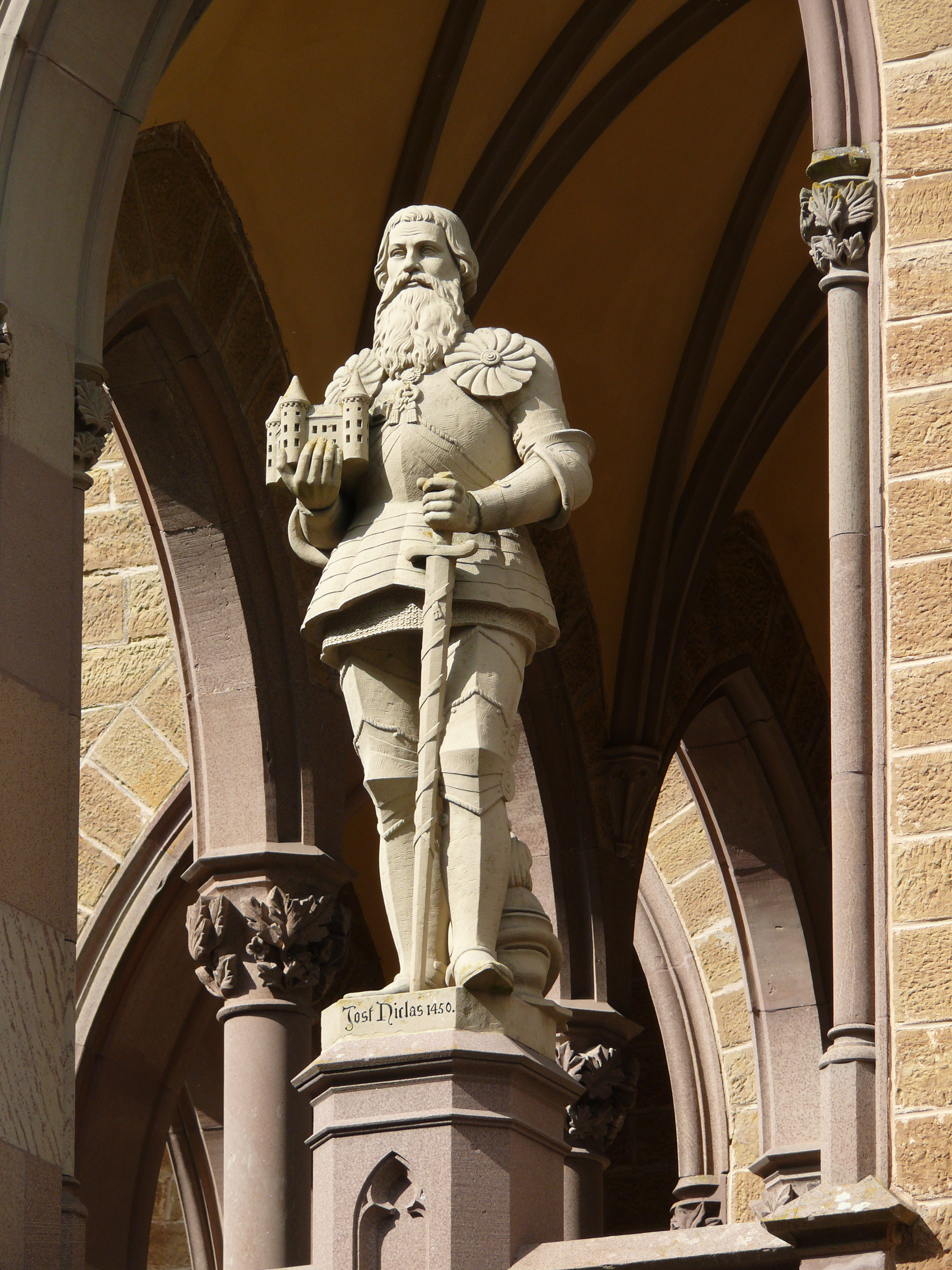

Count of Hohenzollern
- Reign: 1433-1488
- Predecessor: Eitel Friedrich
- Successor: Eitel Friedrich II
- Born: 1433
- Died: 9 February 1488; Zollernalbkreis, Baden-Württemberg, Germany
- Spouse: Agnes of Werdenberg-Heiligenberg
- Issue: Eitel Friedrich II; Eitel Friedrich the Younger
- House: House of Hohenzollern
- Father: Eitel Friedrich I, Count of Hohenzollern
- Mother: Ursula of Rhäzüns (died in 1477)

Jobst Nikolaus I, Count of Hohenzollern (also known as Jost Nikolaus I or Jos Nikolaus I; 1433 – 9 February 1488) was a German nobleman from the Swabian branch of the House of Hohenzollern. He was the ruling Count of Hohenzollern from shortly after his birth until his death.

== Life ==
Jobst Nikolaus I became the nominal ruler of the County of Hohenzollern shortly after his birth. Initially, he stood under the regency and guardianship of his father Eitel Friedrich I (c. 1384 – 1439). Under a succession treaty of 1429 with the House of Württemberg, the county would fall to the Counts of Württemberg if the Swabian branch of the House of Hohenzollern were to die out in the male line. With Jobst Nikolaus's birth, this risk was averted.

Emperor Friedrich III granted Jobst Nikolaus I and his heirs in 1471 the right to operate a mine in his county, and the right to mint coins. In 1488, Jobst Nikolaus acquired the Lordship of Haigerloch. He rebuilt the ancestral seat, Hohenzollern Castle. It would serve as the residence of the Counts of Hohenzollern until the late 18th century.

The county had come in a precarious political situation during the reign of the preceding generation. The county was fragmented when it had been divided between his father and his uncle Friedrich XII. The financial situation was almost hopeless and there was a risk that the Swabian line of the Hohenzollerns might die out. Friedrich XII had sold some land to improve the financial situation, however, this meant that the county became politically insignificant. The situation began to improve during the reign of Jobst Nikolaus's father, Eitel Friedrich I. Jobst Nikolaus managed to enlarge the territory significantly. This positive development continued under his son Eitel Friedrich II.

== Marriage and issue ==
In 1448, Jobst Nikolaus married Countess Agnes of Werdenberg-Heiligenberg (1434–1467), a sister of Bishop Johann II of Augsburg. Together, they had the following children:

- Friedrich (1451 – 8 March 1505), Bishop of Augsburg
- Eitel Friedrich II (1452–1512), his successor as Count of Hohenzollern
- Eitel Friedrich the Younger (1454 – 27 June 1490), Dutch admiral
- Friedrich Albrecht († 16 July 1483), a colonel in the imperial army, fell before Utrecht
- Friedrich Johann (d. 18 November 1483) a colonel in the imperial army, fell in the battle of Dendermonde
- Helen (d. 11 November 1514), married Johann II of Waldburg-Wolfegg (d. 19 October 1511)

== Ancestry ==
Ancestors of Jobst Nikolaus I of Hohenzollern

16. Frederick VIII, Count of Zollern
8. Frederick, Count of Hohenzollern
4. Frederick XI, Count of Hohenzollern
18. Count Burchard V. of Hohenberg-Wildberg
9. Countess Margaret of Hohenburg-Wildenburg
19. Adelheid of Vaihingen
2. Eitel Friedrich I, Count of Hohenzollern
20. Count Götz of Fürstenberg-Haslach
10. Count Hugo of Fürstenberg-Zindelstein
21. Anna of Montfort
5. Adelheid of Fürstenberg-Zindelstein
11. Adelheid of Krenkingen
1. Jobst Nikolaus I, Count of Hohenzollern
24. Heinrich of Rhäzüns
12. Ulrich II. Brun of Rhäzüns
25. Adelheid of Belmont
6. Heinrich V. of Rhäzüns
26. Albrecht II of Werdenberg-Heiligenberg
13. Elisabeth of Werdenberg-Heiligenberg
27. Agnes of Hohenzollern-Nuremberg
3. Ursula of Rhäzüns
7. Verena of Stoffeln

Jobst Nikolaus I of Hohenzollern House of Hohenzollern Born: 1433 Died: 9 February 1488
Preceded by Eitel Friedrich I	Count of Hohenzollern; 1433–1488	Succeeded by Eitel Friedrich II
