= Eitel Friedrich of Zollern =

Eitel Friedrich the younger of Zollern (1454 – Montfoort, 27 June 1490) was a German nobleman who served as Admiral of the Netherlands.

== Biography ==
He was the third son of Jobst Nikolaus I, Count of Hohenzollern (1433–1488) and Agnes of Werdenberg-Heiligenberg (1434–1467).

Eitel Friedrich followed Maximilian of Austria to the Low Countries. He participated with him in the Battle of Guinegate (1479), had been one of his army commanders in the Siege of Utrecht (1483), and fought against the Flemish rebellion. In 1488, he succeeded Philip of Cleves, Lord of Ravenstein as Admiral of the Netherlands, because Cleves had defected to the rebels.

Eitel Friedrich died during the siege of Montfoort. Two of his brothers had died in battle before him.
He was succeeded by Cornelis of Glymes.
