= Eitel Friedrich II of Hohenzollern =

Count of Hohenzollern (c. 1452–1512)

Eitel Friedrich II, Count of Hohenzollern
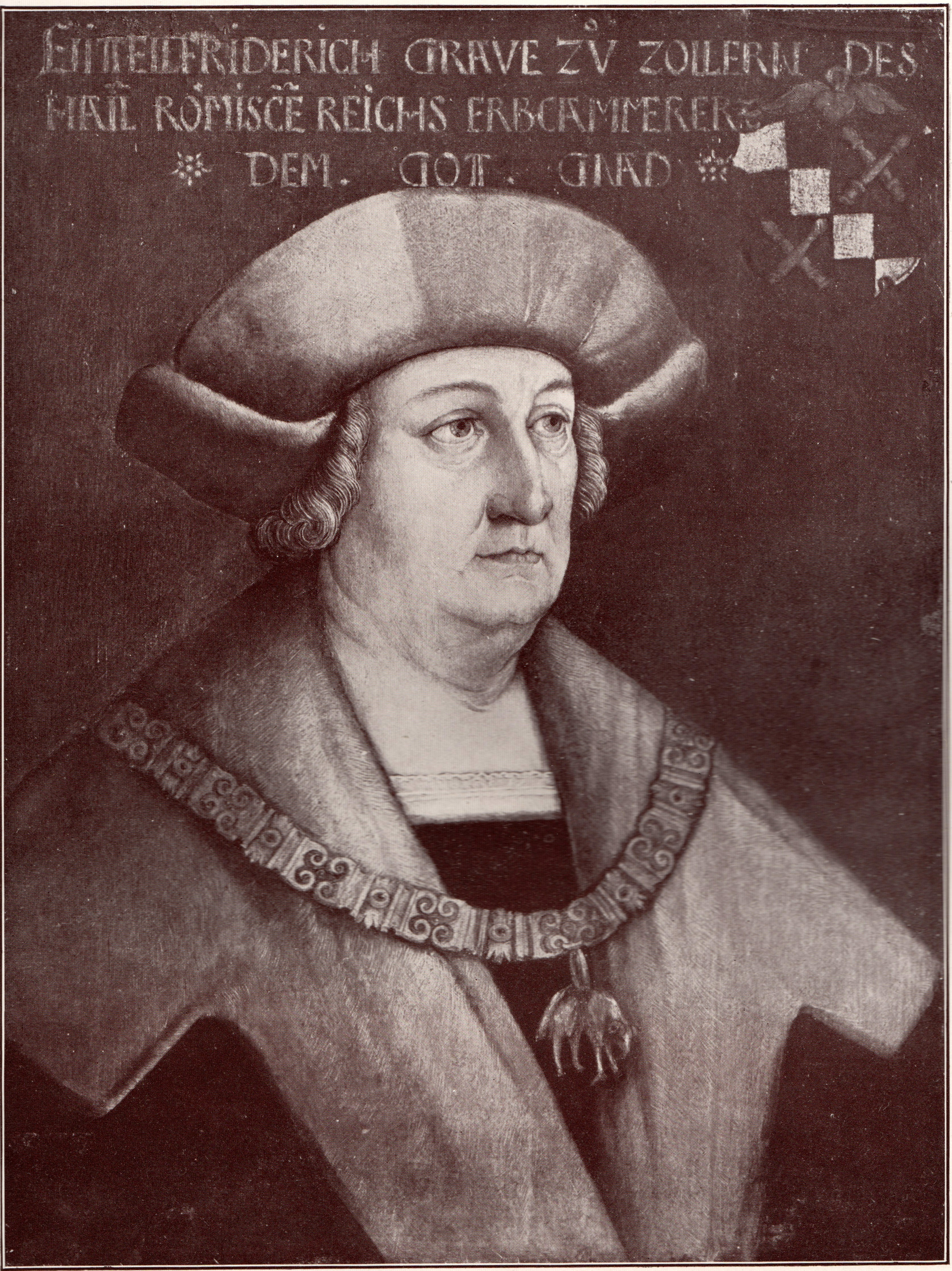
- Eitel Friedrich II, Count of Hohenzollern
- Born: c. 1452
- Died: 18 June 1512; Trier, Electorate of Trier
- Buried: Collegiate Church in Hechingen
- Noble family: House of Hohenzollern
- Spouse: Magdalena of Brandenburg
- Issue: Eitel Friedrich III, Count of Hohenzollern
- Father: Jobst Nikolaus I, Count of Hohenzollern
- Mother: Agnes of Werdenberg-Heiligenberg

Eitel Friedrich II, Count of Hohenzollern (c. 1452 – 18 June 1512 in Trier, Electorate of Trier) was a count of Hohenzollern and belonged to the Swabian line of the House of Hohenzollern. He was the first president of the Reichskammergericht. As a close friend of the Archduke and later Emperor Maximilian I, he gained great influence in the imperial politics. He managed to consolidate and expand his own territory.

== Relationship with the Franconian line ==
Eitel Friedrich II was the son and heir of Count Jobst Nikolaus I (1433–1488). He continued his father's policy of good relationships with the Franconian line of the House of Hohenzollern, who ruled the Burgraviate of Nuremberg and the Margraviate of Brandenburg. During his father's reign, he spent several years at the court of Elector Albrecht Achilles. From 1481, he served as captain of the Lordship of Krosno Odrzańskie, east of the Oder. In 1483, he became a Councillor in Brandenburg. Later, he served as governor of Kottbus and Züllichau.

In 1482 in Berlin, he married Magdalena, the daughter of Margrave Friedrich of the Altmark, thus creating a family relationship between the two lines of Hohenzollern. Elector Albrecht Achilles, who held some possessions in Swabia himself, protected his Swabian relatives against the powerful Counts of Württemberg, who had formed a threat to the Swabian Hohenzollerns for a long time.

== Relationship with the House of Habsburg ==
Eitel Friedrich II was a close friend of Maximilian I and maintained excellent relations with the House of Habsburg. This gained great influence on imperial politics. He provided diplomatic services for Maximilian and fought for him in the Netherlands. He distinguished himself in the Battle of Guinegate in 1479 and in 1488, he led the vanguard against rebellious citizens of Bruges, who held the newly elected Emperor captive.

Eitel Friedrich had served Maximilan as judge and when the Reichskammergericht was established in 1495, Eitel Friedrich was its first president. In 1497 or 1498, he was appointed as Councillor in Austria. In 1499, Eitel Friedrich and Dietrich Blumeneck led a small army against Switzerland and conquered Rorschach on the south bank of Lake Constance. In 1500, he occupied the County of Gorizia for Austria. In 1501, he was awarded the Order of the Golden Fleece.

On 12 September 1504, during the Landshut War of Succession, he fought at Regensburg against Bohemia and the Palatinate. He commanded the right wing of the cavalry and contributed significantly to the victory.

== Legacy ==
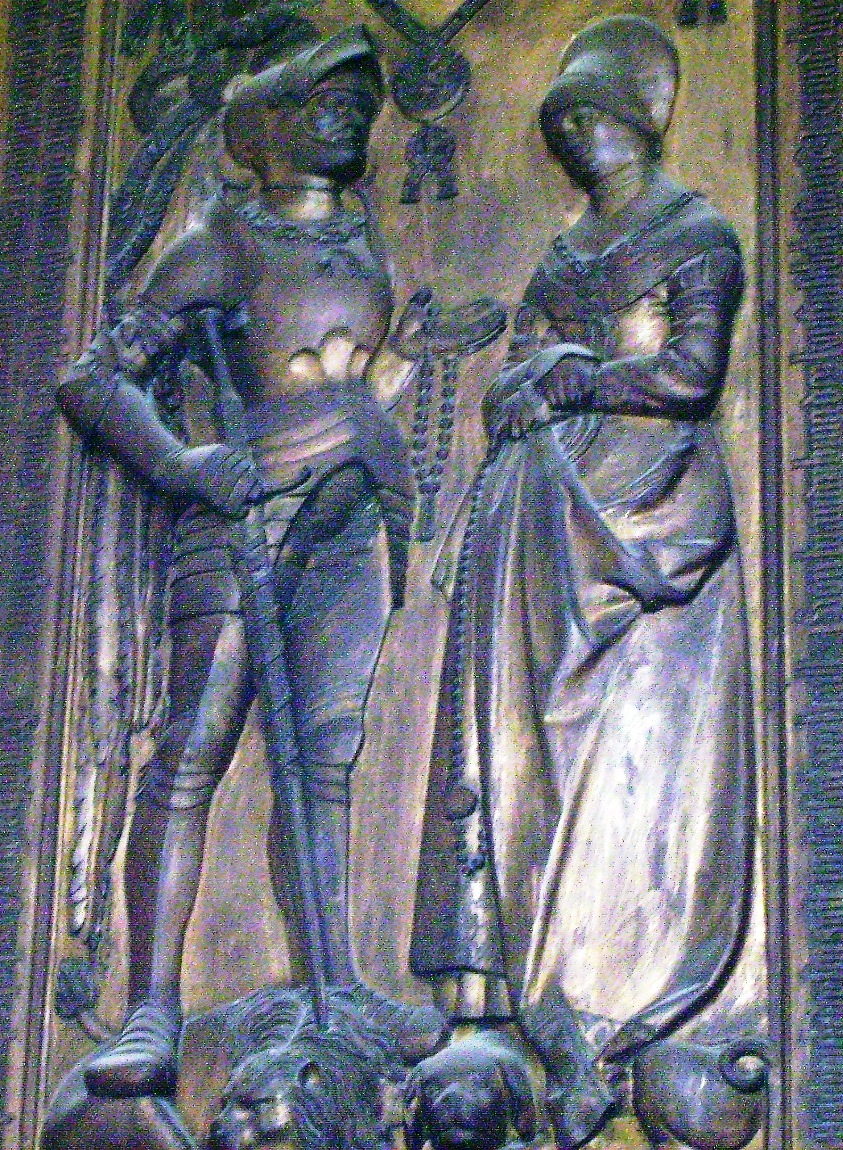
Tombstone of Eitel Friedrich II and his wife in the Collegiate Church in Hechingen

In 1505 Eitel Friedrich II founded the Collegiate Church in Hechingen, where a tombstone for him and his wife can be seen.

== Issue ==
The following children were born from the marriage of Eitel Friedrich and Magdalena of Brandenburg:

- Franz Wolfgang (1483 or 1484 – 1517), married c. 1503 to Margravine Rosine of Baden (5 March 1487 – 29 October 1554), daughter of Christopher I, Margrave of Baden and Ottilie of Katzenelnbogen.
- Wandelberta (c. 1484 – 1551), married in 1507 to Count Albrecht III of Hohenlohe-Weikersheim (d. 1551)
- Joachim (1485 or 1486 – 1538), married in 1513 to Anastasia of Stoffeln (d. 1530)
- Maria Salome (1488–1548), married in 1507 to Count Ludwig XV of Oettingen (d. 1557)
- Eitel Friedrich III (1494–1525), his successor, married Johanna of Witthem (d. 1544)
- Anna (1496–1530), a nun

== Ancestry ==
Ancestors of Eitel Friedrich II of Hohenzollern

16. Count Friedrich of Strasbourg
8. Frederick XI, Count of Hohenzollern
17. Countess Margaret of Hohenburg-Wildenburg
4. Eitel Friedrich I, Count of Hohenzollern
18. Count Hugo of Fürstenberg-Zindelstein
9. Adelheid of Fürstenberg-Zindelstein
19. Adelheid of Krenkingen
2. Jobst Nikolaus I, Count of Hohenzollern
20. Ulrich II. Brun of Rhäzüns
10. Heinrich V. of Rhäzüns
21. Elisabeth of Werdenberg-Heiligenberg
5. Ursula of Rhäzüns
22.
11. Verena of Stoffeln
23.
1. Eitel Friedrich II, Count of Hohenzollern
24. Count Heinrich VII of Werdenberg
12. Eberhard III, Count of Werdenberg-Sargans
25. Agnes of Teck
6. John IV, Count of Werdenberg-Sargans
26. Baron Johann II of Zimmern
13. Anna of Zimmern
27. Kunigunde von Werdenberg-Sargans
3. Countess Agnes of Werdenberg-Heiligenberg
28. Count Ulrich of Württemberg
14. Eberhard III, Count of Württemberg
29. Elisabeth of Bavaria
7. Elisabeth of Württemberg
30. John III, Burgrave of Nuremberg
15. Elisabeth of Nuremberg
31. Margaret of Bohemia

Eitel Friedrich II of Hohenzollern House of Hohenzollern Born: c. 1452 Died: 18 June 1512
Preceded by Jobst Nikolaus I	Count of Hohenzollern; 1488–1512	Succeeded by Eitel Friedrich III
