= Magdalena of Brandenburg, Countess of Hohenzollern =

German noblewoman (1460–1496)

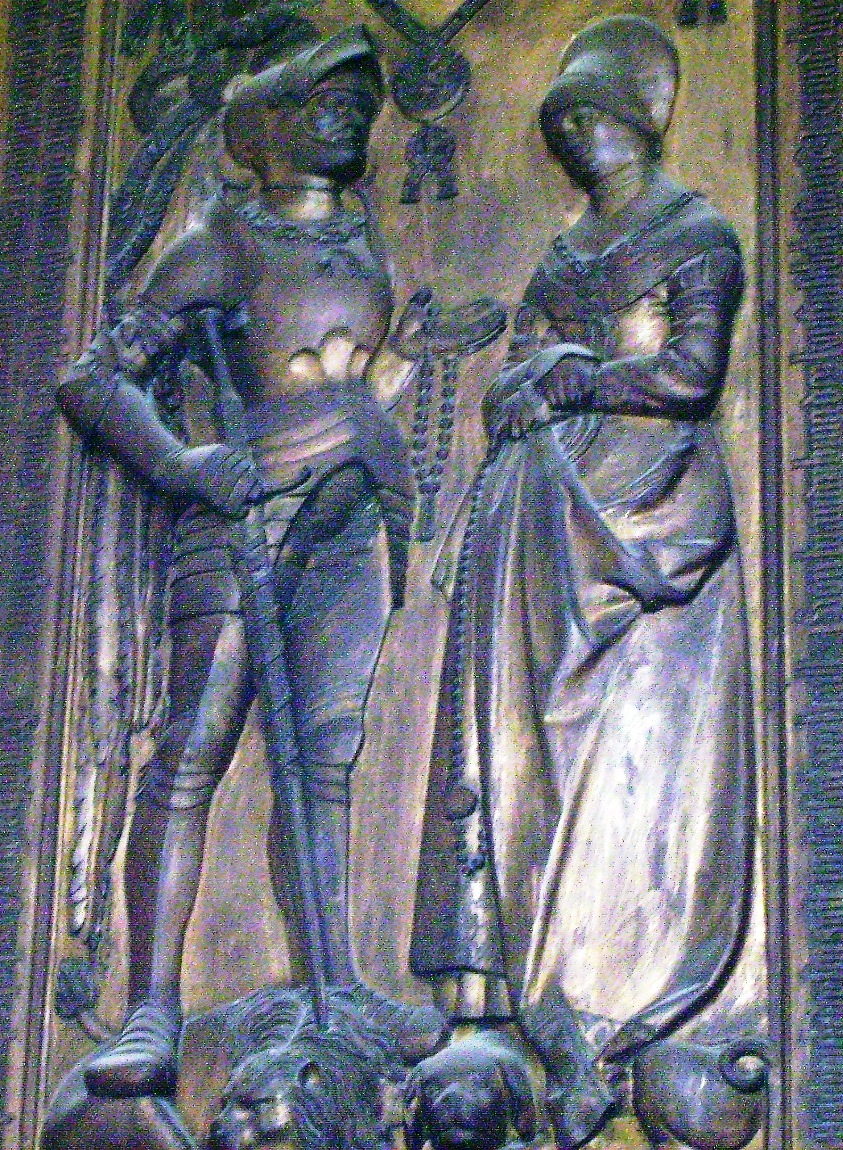
- Grave stone of Magdalena and her husband in the collegiate church of St. James in Hechingen
- Born: 1460; Tangermünde
- Died: 17 June 1496; Hohenzollern Castle
- Buried: Collegiate church of St. James in Hechingen
- Noble family: House of Hohenzollern
- Spouse: Eitel Frederick II, Count of Hohenzollern
- Father: Frederick of Altmark
- Mother: Agnes of Pomerania-Wolgast

Magdalene of Brandenburg (1460 in Tangermünde – 17 June 1496 at Hohenzollern Castle) was a German noblewoman. She was a princess of Brandenburg by birth and by marriage a Duchess of Hohenzollern.

== Life ==
Magdalena was the only child of Margrave Frederick III of Brandenburg-Altmark (1424–1463) from his marriage to Agnes (1436–1512), daughter of the Duke Barnim VIII of Pomerania.

She married on 17 June 1482 in the Berlin City Palace to Count Eitel Friedrich II of Hohenzollern (1452–1512). This marriage formed an important connection for the House of Hohenzollern, as it strengthened the bond between the Swabian and Brandenburg branches of the house. Magdalena became the ancestress of the Hohenzollern-Hechingen and Hohenzollern-Sigmaringen lines.

Magdalena died in 1496 and was buried in the collegiate church of St. James in Hechingen. A grave plate next to the high altar, probably sculpted by Peter Vischer the Elder, shows Magdalena and her husband in a traditional German costume, with a medal of the Order of Our Lady of the Swan around her neck and a dog at her feet (a symbol of feminine loyalty). The grave plate is considered a major work of art in Hechingen.

== Issue ==
The following children were born from the marriage of Eitel Frederick and Magdalena of Brandenburg:

- Francis Wolfgang (1483 or 1484 – 1517), married c. 1503 to Margravine Rosine of Baden (1487–1554)
- Wandelberta (c. 1484 – 1551), married in 1507 to Count Albert III of Hohenlohe-Weikersheim (died 1551)
- Joachim (1485 or 1586 – 1538), married in 1513 to Anastasia of Stoffeln (died 1530)
- Maria Salome (1488–1548), married in 1507 to Count Louis XV of Oettingen (died 1557)
- Eitel Frederick III (1494–1525), his successor, married Johanna of Witthem (died 1544)
- Anna (1496–1530), a nun
