= Frederick VIII of Zollern =

Count of Zollern
- Reign: 4 May 1298 – 1333
- Predecessor: Frederick VI
- Successor: Frederick IX
- Died: 1333
- Issue: Fritz II; Friedrich IX; Friedrich "Easter Sunday" II; Friedrich of Strasbourg
- House: Hohenzollern
- Mother: Kunigunde of Baden

Friedrich VIII, Count of Zollern, nicknamed Easter Sunday (d. 1333) was a Count of Hohenzollern.

== Life ==
Friedrich was the younger son of the Count Friedrich VI of Hohenzollern from his marriage to Kunigunde (1265–1310), the daughter of Margrave Rudolf I of Baden. After his elder brother Friedrich VII died in 1309, Frederik VIII ruled Zollern jointly with his nephew Fritz I. After Fritz I died in 1313, Friedrich VIII ruled alone.

Friedrich VIII founded the Hohenzollern line when he divided the county with his brother. In the power conflict of his time, Friedrich VIII supported the Austrian side, and later sided with Emperor Louis IV.

== Issue ==
The name of Friedrich's wife has not been preserved. He had the following children:

- Fritz II (died between 1355 and 1359), Count of Zollern
- Friedrich IX (died between 1377 and 1379), Count of Hohenzollern, married in 1341 to Countess Adelheid of Hohenberg (d. after 1385)
- Friedrich "Easter Sunday" II (d. 1395), prior of the Order of Saint John
- Friedrich of Strasbourg (d. 1365), married in 1343 to Countess Margaret of Hohenberg-Wildberg, parents of:
  - Frederick XI, Count of Hohenzollern.

== Ancestry ==
Ancestors of Frederick VIII of Zollern

16. Frederick I, Burgrave of Nuremberg
8. Frederick IV, Count of Zollern
17. Sophia of Raabs
4. Frederick V, Count of Zollern
18. Friedrich, Count of Abenberg
9. Elisabeth of Abensberg
2. Frederick VI, Count of Zollern
20. Adalbert III., Count of Dillingen
10. Hartmann IV, Count of Dillingen
21. daughter of Otto I, Duke of Bavaria
5. Udilhild of Dillingen
11. Willibirg
1. Frederick VIII, Count of Zollern
24. Herman IV, Margrave of Baden
12. Herman V, Margrave of Baden-Baden
25. Bertha of Tübingen
6. Rudolf I, Margrave of Baden-Baden
26. Henry V, Count Palatine of the Rhine
13. Countess Palatine Irmengard of the Rhine
27. Agnes of Hohenstaufen
3. Kunigunde of Baden
28. Eberhard III. von Eberstein
14. Count Otto I, of Eberstein
29. Kunigunde von Andechs
7. Kunigunde of Eberstein

== See also ==
- House of Hohenzollern

== Footnotes ==
Frederick VIII of Zollern House of Hohenzollern Died: 1333
| Preceded by Friedrich VII | Count of Hohenzollern; 1309–1333 | Succeeded by Friedrich IX |
