= Frederick VI of Zollern =

Count of Zollern

Count of Zollern
- Reign: 24 May 1289 – 4 May 1298
- Predecessor: Frederick V
- Successor: Frederick VII
- Died: 4 May 1298
- Spouse: Kunigunde of Baden
- Issue: Albrecht; Kunigunde; Friedrich VII; Friedrich VIII "Easter Sunday"; Sophia; Friedrich
- House: Hohenzollern
- Mother: Udilhild of Dillingen

Friedrich VI, Count of Zollern (died 4 May 1298), also known as Friedrich the Knight, or Friedrich the Elder, was a Count of Hohenzollern

== Life ==
Friedrich was a son of Count Friedrich V of Hohenzollern from his marriage to Udilhild of Dillingen. He succeeded his father around 1288 as Count of Zollern. Later that year, he divided his inheritance with his younger brother Friedrich the Younger. Friedrich VI kept the County of Zollern, while his younger brother received the Lordships of Schalksburg and Mühlheim.

In 1296 Friedrich sold some land to the Bebenhausen Abbey.

== Marriage and issue ==
In 1281, Friedrich married Kunigunde (1265–1310), the daughter of Margrave Rudolf I of Baden, with whom he had the following children:

- Albrecht
- Kunigunde (died between 1380 and 1384), abbess of Lichtenthal Abbey
- Friedrich VII (d. 1309), Count of Zollern

married in 1298 to Countess Eufemia of Hohenberg (d. 1333)

- Friedrich VIII "Easter Sunday" (d. 1333), Count of Hohenzollern
- Sophia (died after 1300), a nun at Stetten Abbey
- Friedrich († 1361)

Frederick VI of Zollern House of Hohenzollern Died: 4 May 1298
Preceded by Friedrich V	Count of Hohenzollern; 1288–1298	Succeeded by Friedrich VII

== See also ==
- House of Hohenzollern
