= Frederick V of Zollern =

Count of Zollern
- Reign: 1255 – 24 May 1289
- Predecessor: Frederick IV
- Successor: Frederick VI
- Died: 24 May 1289; Hohenzollern Castle
- Spouse: Udilhild of Dillingen
- Issue: Friedrich VI; Friedrich; Adelheid; Friedrich of Merkenberg; Wilburg
- House: House of Hohenzollern
- Father: Friedrich IV, Count of Zollern
- Mother: Elisabeth of Abensberg

Friedrich V of Zollern (died 24 May 1289, at Hohenzollern Castle) nicknamed, the Illustrious was a Count of Zollern.

== Life ==
Friedrich was a son of the Count Friedrich IV of Zollern from his 1248 marriage to Elisabeth of Abensberg. He succeeded his father around 1255 as Count of Zollern.

Friedrich was appointed reeve of Beuron Archabbey. He founded the Stetten Abbey in Gnadental in 1259 and he and his wife expanded the abbey in 1267. They added a crypt where members of the Zollern family would be buried. A tunnel may have connected the castle to this crypt. Legend has it that Friedrich built this abbey to resolve a problem he had with Emperor Friedrich II, after he had refused to contribute troops when the Emperor was raising an army.

Friedrich has a long-running conflict with the Counts of Hohenberg, which was settled when King Rudolf I of Germany mediated in 1286.

Friedrich was described as pious and respectful. During his reign, the county of Zollern reached the peak of its influence. After his death, the county was divided among his sons and lost its importance.

== Marriage and issue ==
In 1258, Friedrich married Udilhild, the daughter of Hartmann, the Count of Dillingen, and sister of Bishop Hartmann of Augsburg. Udilhild survived her husband and died as a nun in Stetten Abbey. They had the following children:

- Friedrich VI (d. 1298), Count of Zollern

married in 1281 to Princess Kunigunde of Baden (1265–1310)

- Friedrich (d. 1304), provost in Augsburg
- Adelheid (d. 1296/1308)

married Heinrich of Geroldeck (d. 1300)

- Friedrich of Merkenberg (d. 1302/3), founder of the line at Schalksburg

married in 1282 to Udilhild of Merkenberg (d. 1305)

- Wilburg (died after 1300), a nun in Stetten

== Footnotes ==
Frederick V of Zollern House of Hohenzollern Died: 24 May 1289
Preceded by Friedrich IV	Count of Zollern; 1255–1289	Succeeded by Friedrich VI
