= IJzerlo =

- Hamlet
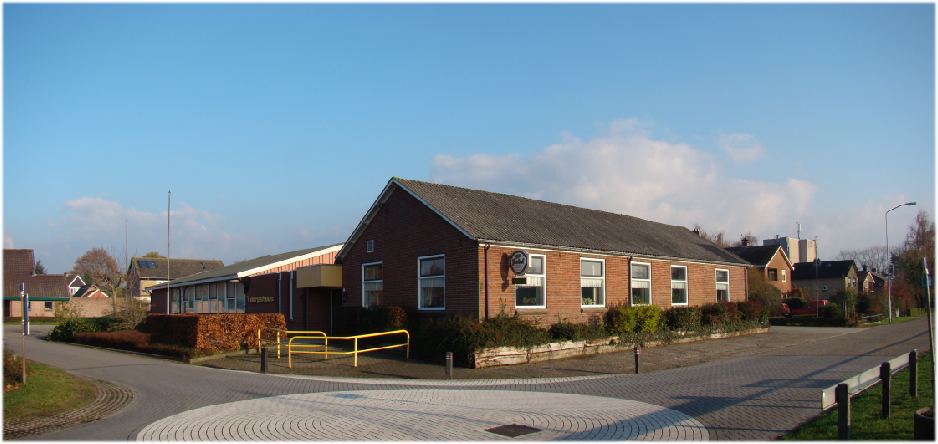
- Skyline of IJzerlo

- Location in the province of Gelderland IJzerlo (Netherlands)
- Coordinates: 51°53′N 6°32′E
- Country: Netherlands
- Province: Gelderland
- Municipality: Aalten

Area
  - Total: 0.11 km^{2} (0.042 sq mi)
- Elevation: 24 m (79 ft)

Population (2021)
  - Total: 165
  - Density: 1,500/km^{2} (3,900/sq mi)
- Time zone: UTC+1 (CET)
  - Summer (DST): UTC+2 (CEST)
- Postal code: 7122
- Dialing code: 0543

IJzerlo is a hamlet in the municipality of Aalten, between Aalten and Dinxperlo in the (Achterhoek region) in the eastern Netherlands.

It was first mentioned in 1356 as Yserlo, and means "forest with primeval soil". In 1840, it was home to 438 people. The postal authorities have placed it under Aalten.

IJzerlo has built a local reputation for its annual Farm & Country Fair, the Easter fire and the provision of outdoor play.

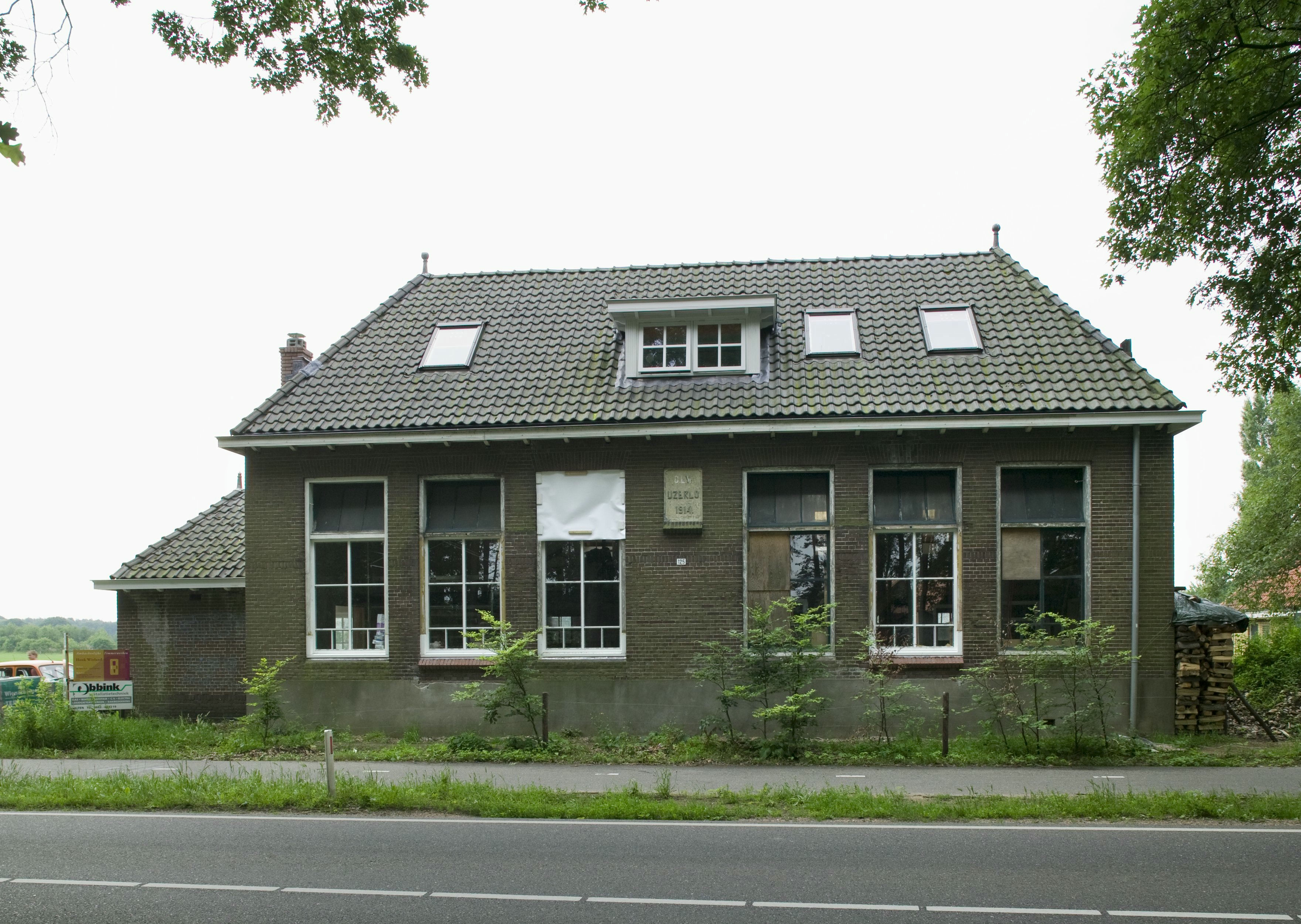
Former school
