= Heurne =

- Hamlet
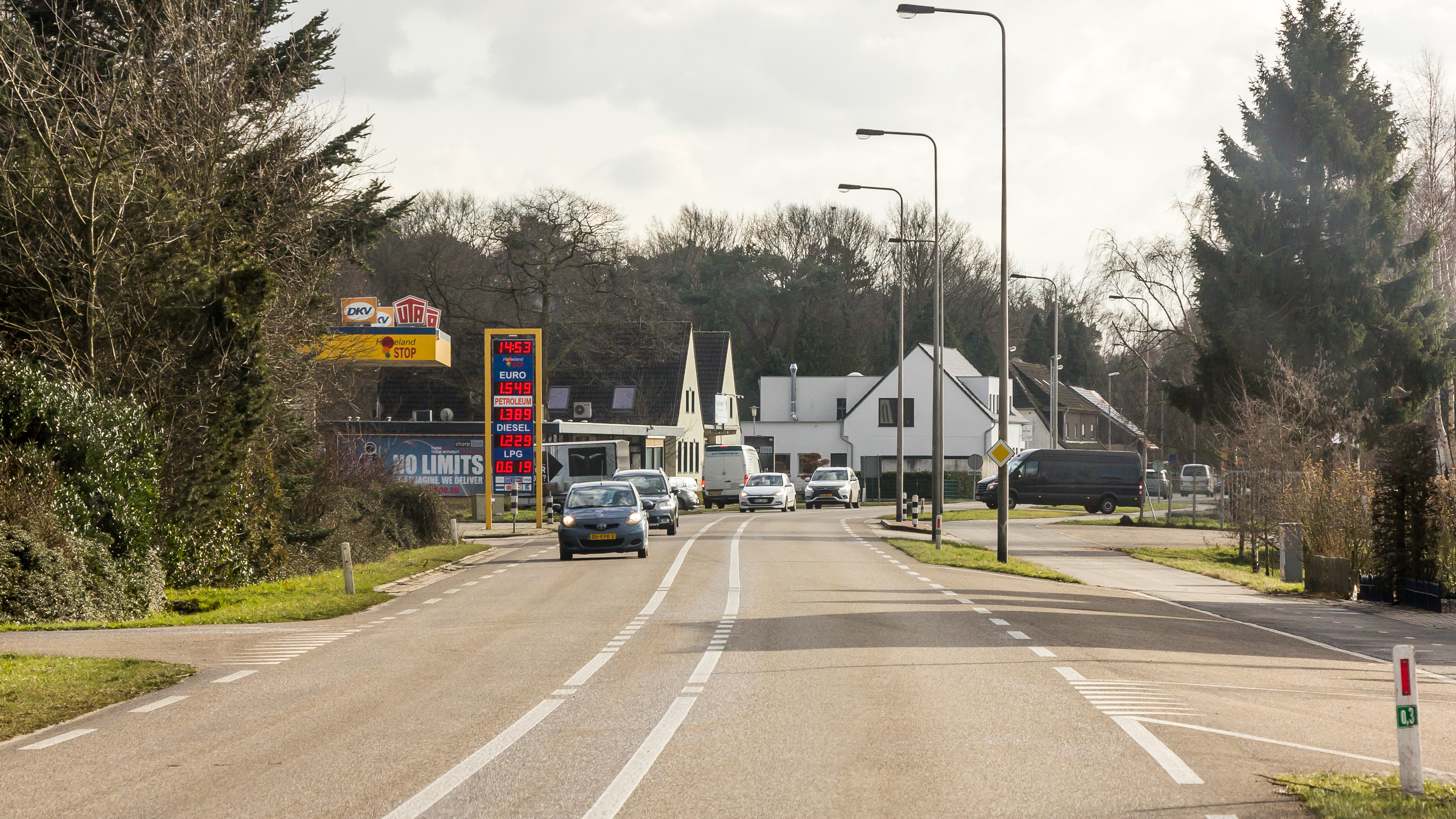

- Location in the province of Gelderland Heurne (Netherlands)
- Coordinates: 51.89951°N 6.57290°E
- Country: Netherlands
- Province: Gelderland
- Municipality: Aalten

Area
  - Total: 7.57 km^{2} (2.92 sq mi)
- Elevation: 24 m (79 ft)

Population (2021)
  - Total: 360
  - Density: 48/km^{2} (120/sq mi)
- Time zone: UTC+1 (CET)
  - Summer (DST): UTC+2 (CEST)
- Postal code: 7122
- Dialing code: 0543

Heurne is a hamlet in the municipality of Aalten, near Aalten (Achterhoek region) in the eastern Netherlands.

It was first mentioned in 1492 as Horne, and means "bent [of a hill]". The postal authorities have placed it under Aalten. In 1840, it was home to 274 people.

Heurne has a village centre, "D'n Heurnsen Tref" and is known of the border crossing Heurne-Hemden. Across the Heurne lies the Hamelandroute. Heurne does not have a centre, only a few stores at the border crossing. To avoid confusion with De Heurne (Dinxperlose Heurne"), Heurne is locally known as "Aaltense Heurne".
