= 't Klooster =

- Hamlet
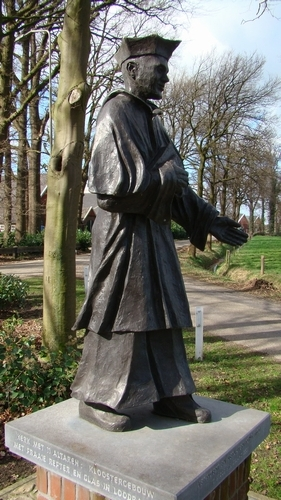

- Location in the province of Gelderland 't Klooster (Netherlands)
- Coordinates: 51°57′48″N 6°37′26″E
- Country: Netherlands
- Province: Gelderland
- Municipality: Aalten
- Elevation: 35 m (115 ft)
- Time zone: UTC+1 (CET)
  - Summer (DST): UTC+2 (CEST)
- Postal code: 7121
- Dialing code: 0543

't Klooster is a hamlet in the municipality of Aalten, near Bredevoort (Achterhoek region) in the eastern Netherlands.

't Klooster is not a statistical entity, and the postal authorities have placed it under Aalten.

Klooster is a Dutch word for "monastery". In the fifteenth century, what is now 't Klooster was home to a monastery named "Nazareth" or "Schaer" devoted to the Devotio Moderna. In addition, in 2005, a bronze statue was revealed, designed by artist Jan te Kulve, which shows an inhabitant of the former monastery wearing the outfit of his order. In 1975, the name 't Klooster first appeared for the hamlet. It has no place name signs, and consists of about 40 houses.
