= Hollenberg, Netherlands =

Hollenberg
- Hamlet
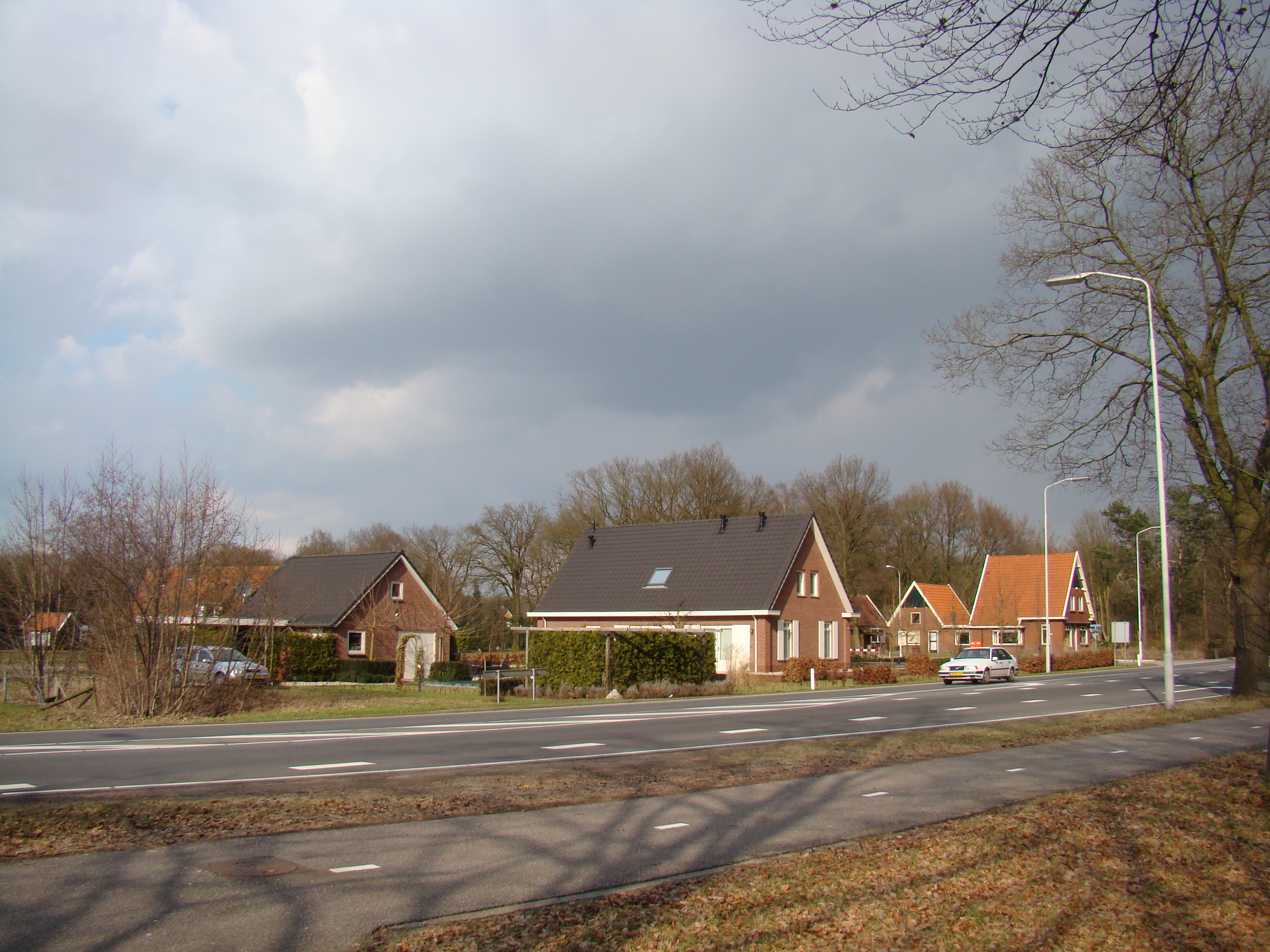

- Location in the province of Gelderland Hollenberg (Netherlands)
- Coordinates: 51°57′N 6°36′E
- Country: Netherlands
- Province: Gelderland
- Municipality: Aalten

Area
  - Total: 1.37 km^{2} (0.53 sq mi)
- Elevation: 35 m (115 ft)

Population (2021)
  - Total: 190
  - Density: 140/km^{2} (360/sq mi)
- Time zone: UTC+1 (CET)
  - Summer (DST): UTC+2 (CEST)
- Postal code: 7121
- Dialing code: 0543

Hollenberg is a hamlet in the Dutch province of Gelderland. It is located in the municipality of Aalten, between Aalten and Bredevoort.

Hollenberg was an execution site in the 18th century. The postal authorities have placed it under Aalten.
