= Suderwick =

Coordinates: 51°52′N 6°30′E

Suderwick is a village in the city of Bocholt, Kreis Borken in the German State of North Rhine-Westphalia. Suderwick is situated at the Germany-Netherlands border and forms one urban area with Dinxperlo, a town in Aalten municipality of Gelderland province of the Netherlands.

One street in Dinxperlo, Heelweg, is partly German. The road itself lies in the Netherlands, but one side of the housing zone is in Suderwick, so in Germany (where it is called Hellweg). Suderwick might be translated as "southern area". Also, the villages house a shared Dutch-German police station.

Besides Dutch and German, at both sides of the border a common dialect is spoken, which is a variety of Low Saxon.

Just after the Second World War, a part of Suderwick was annexed by the Netherlands, one of many pieces of German territory annexed as part of its claims for war reparations. Suderwick reverted to West Germany on 1 August 1963 after negotiations between West Germany and Netherlands led to the Treaty of Settlement between the two countries signed on 8 April 1960.

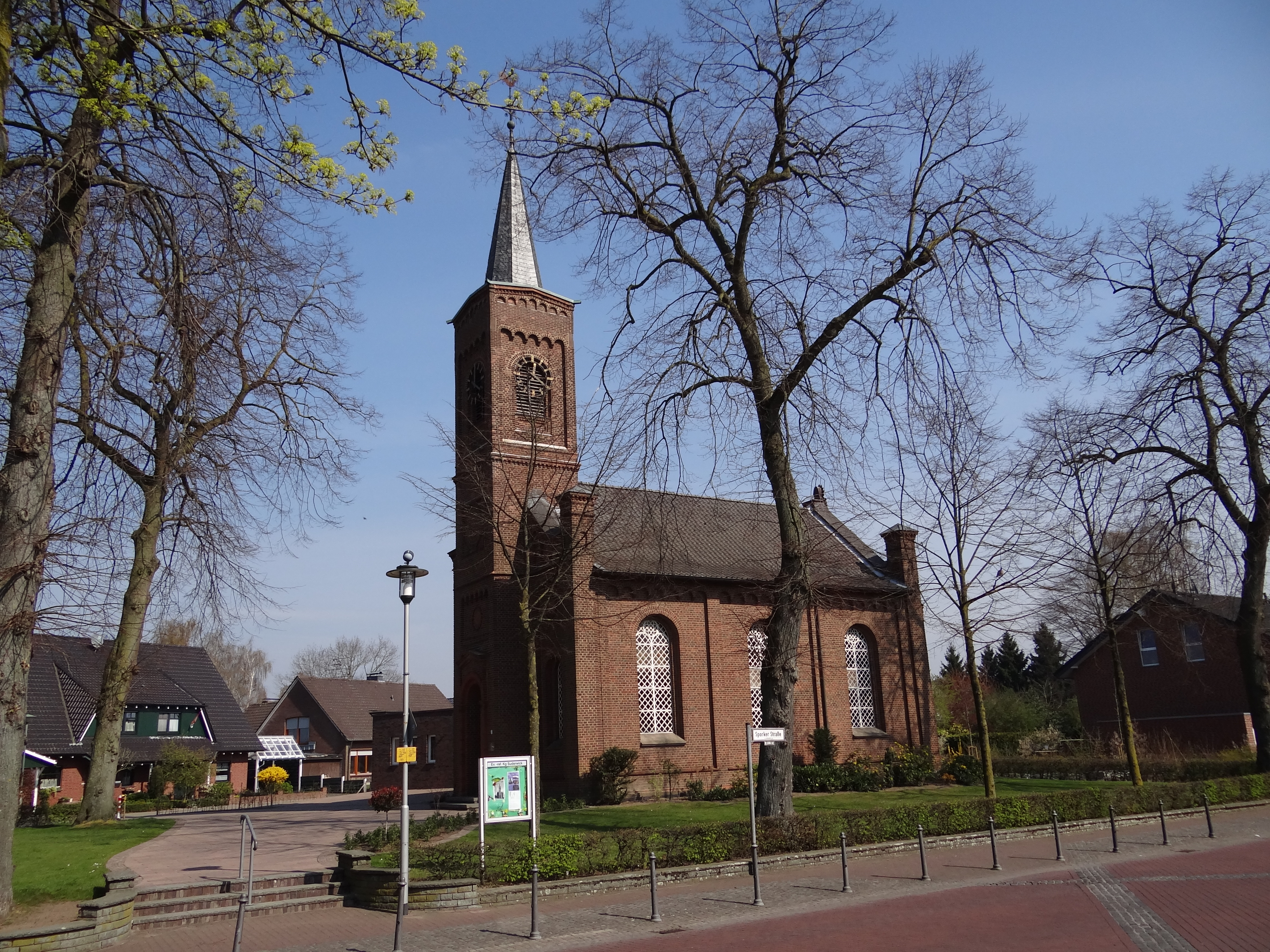
Church

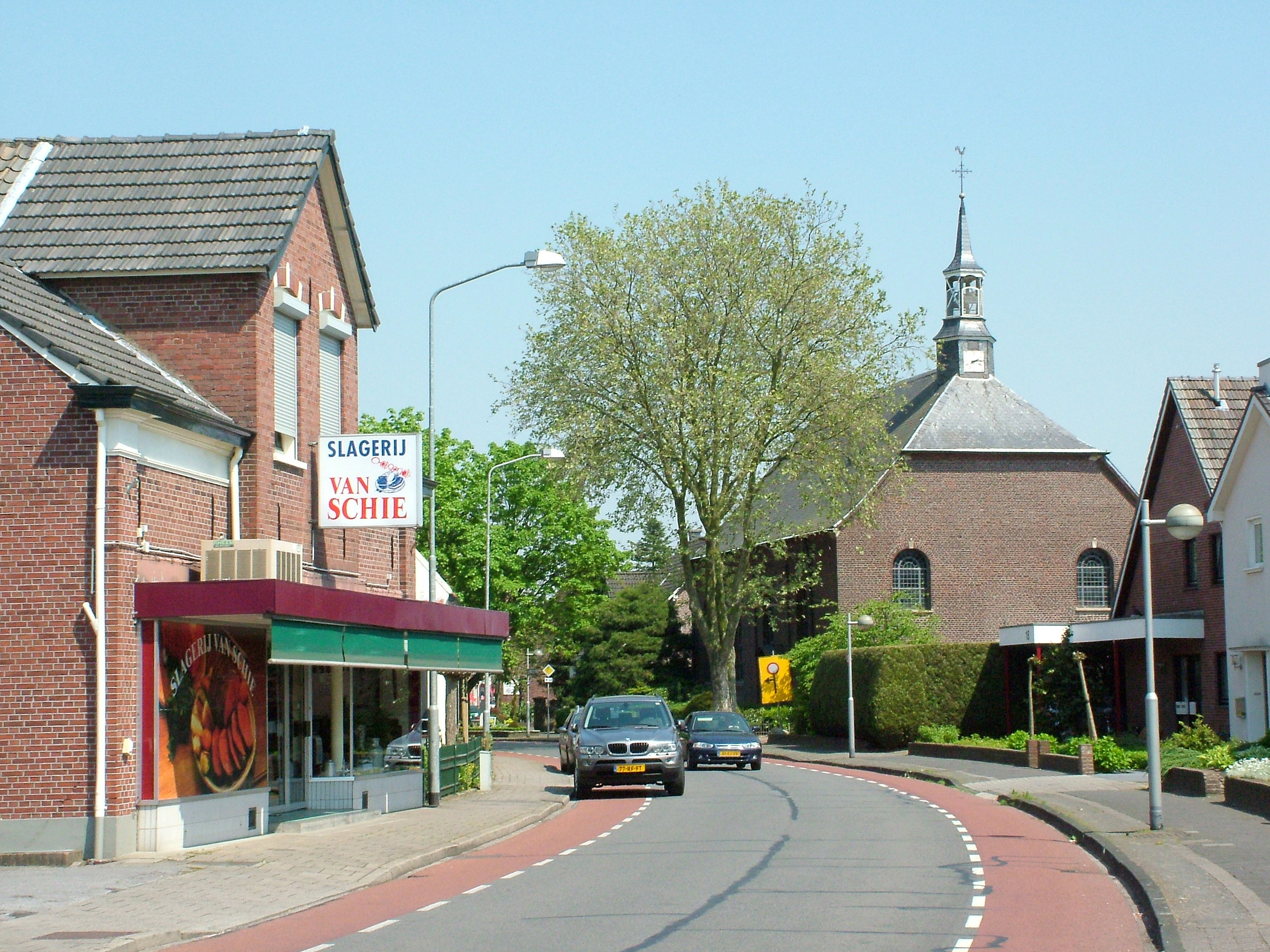
To the left the Heelweg in Dinxperlo, to the right the Hellweg in Suderwick with the Michaelskirche

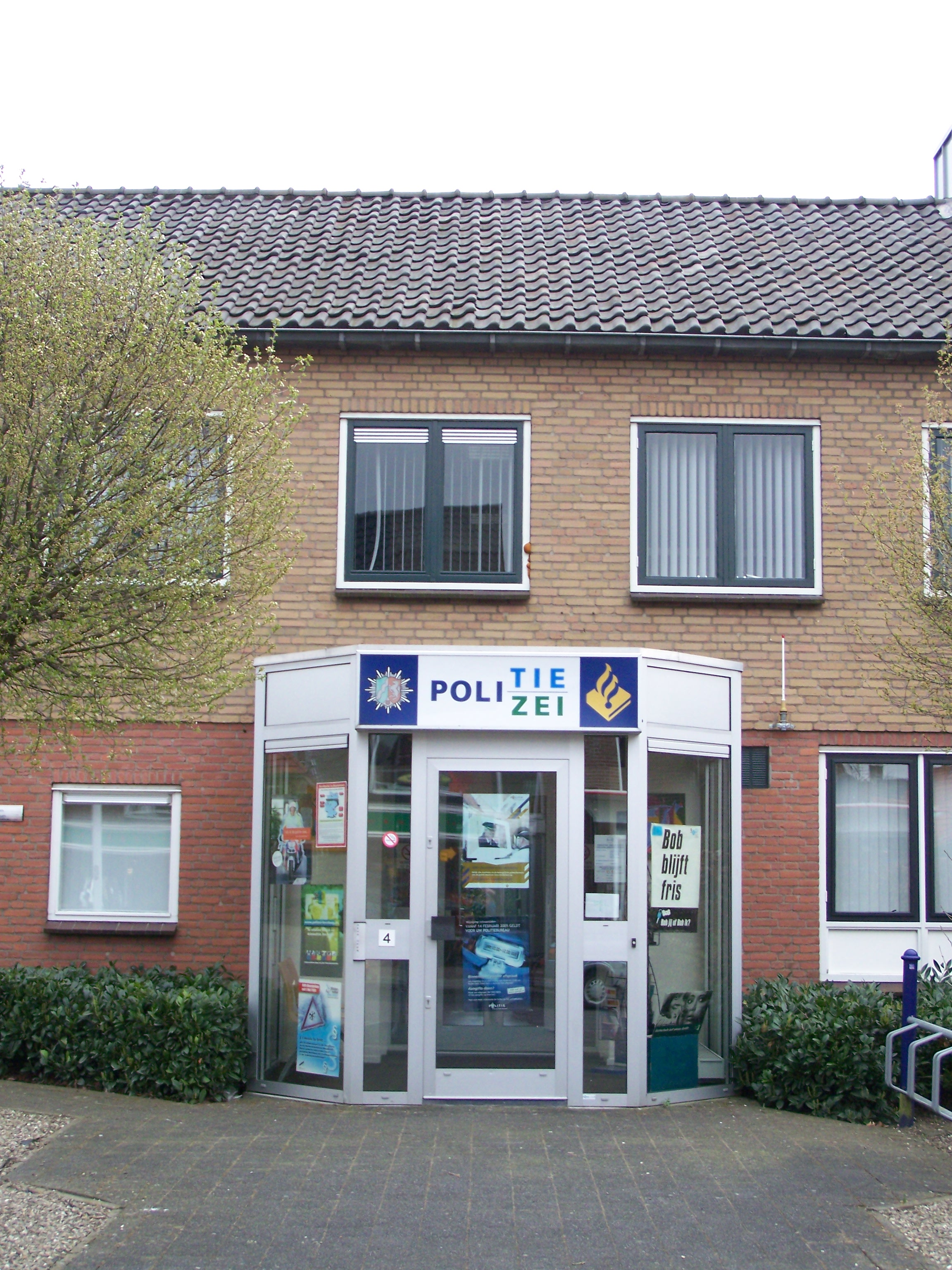
Joint Dutch-German police office
