= De Heurne =

- Village
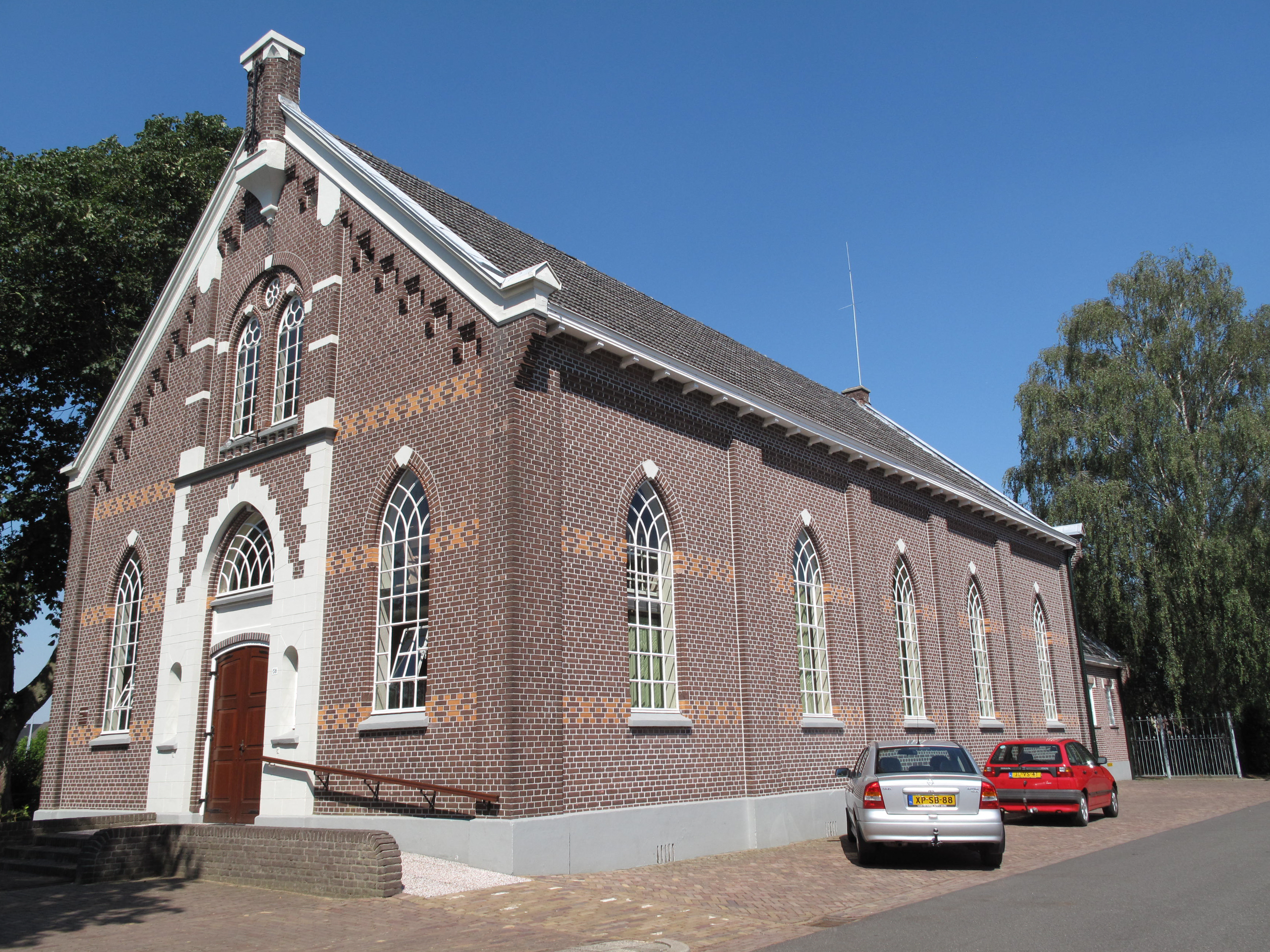
- The church of De Heurne

- Location in the province of Gelderland De Heurne (Netherlands)
- Coordinates: 51°53′21″N 6°29′28″E
- Country: Netherlands
- Province: Gelderland
- Municipality: Aalten

Area
  - Total: 9.32 km^{2} (3.60 sq mi)
- Elevation: 18 m (59 ft)

Population (2021)
  - Total: 1,010
  - Density: 108/km^{2} (281/sq mi)
- Time zone: UTC+1 (CET)
  - Summer (DST): UTC+2 (CEST)
- Postal code: 7095
- Dialing code: 0315

De Heurne is a village in the municipality of Aalten, near Dinxperlo (Achterhoek region), Province of Gelderland, in the east of the Netherlands.

The village was first mentioned in 1841 as "Beggelder en Heurne", and means "means bent [of a hill]". In 1840, it was home to 1,216 people. In 1822, the grist mill Teunismolen was built in De Heurne.

The village has a Protestant church and a school. Between 1904 and 1935, De Heurne had its own train station, on the Varsseveld - Dinxperlo railway line. Although the railway service was discontinued in the 1960s and the station was closed, the original building is still there.

Revenues in the village are mainly from the agricultural sector. In recent years it has shifted towards tourism. Around 1950, the village counted more than ten small grocery shops, however these have all now closed. Nowadays the inhabitants do their shopping mostly in surrounding towns and villages.

To avoid confusion with Heurne ("Aaltense Heurne"), which is also situated in the same region, De Heurne is locally known as "Dinxperlose Heurne".

== Gallery ==
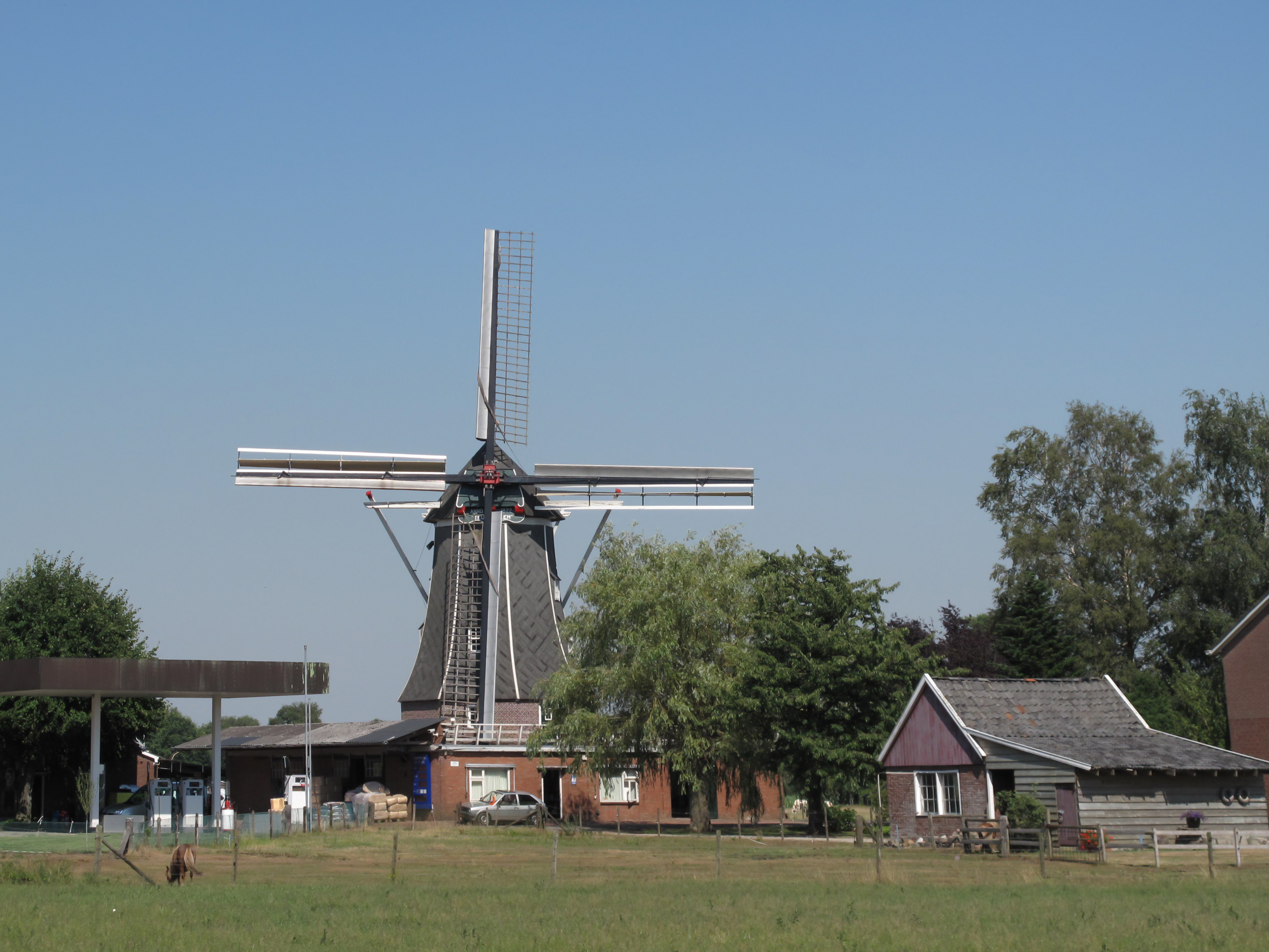
De Heurne, windmill: Teunismolen.

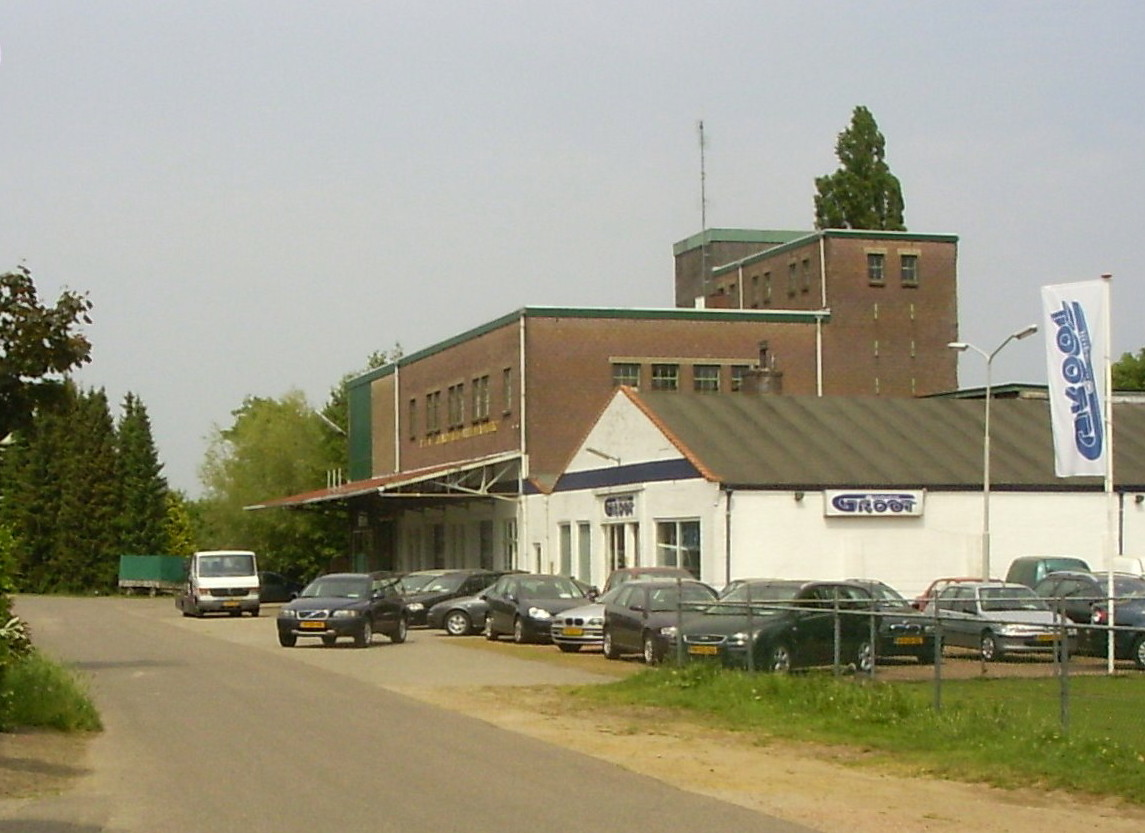
Former factory

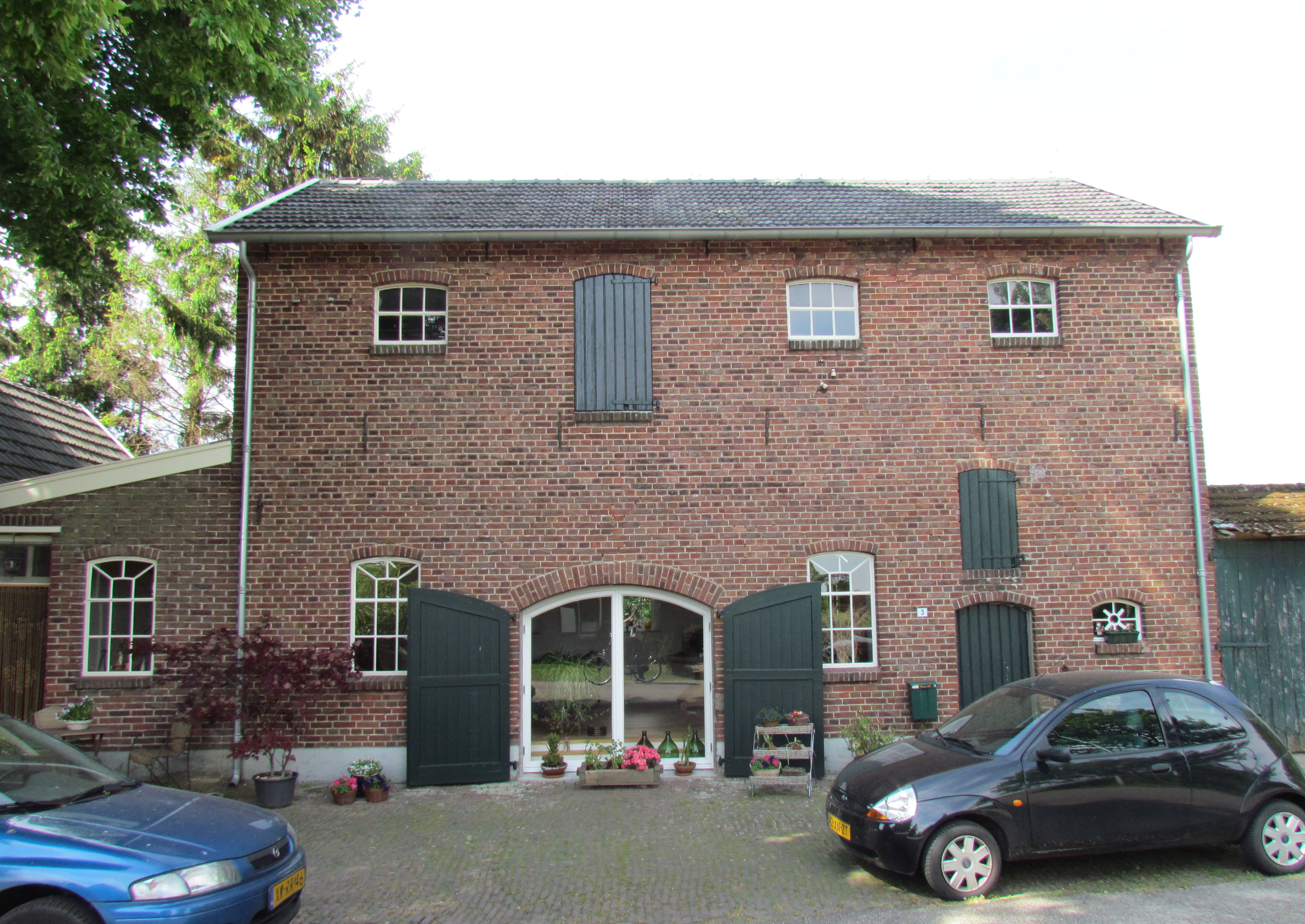
Former mill turned into a shop
