= Aalten Synagogue =

Synagogue in Gelderland, Netherlands

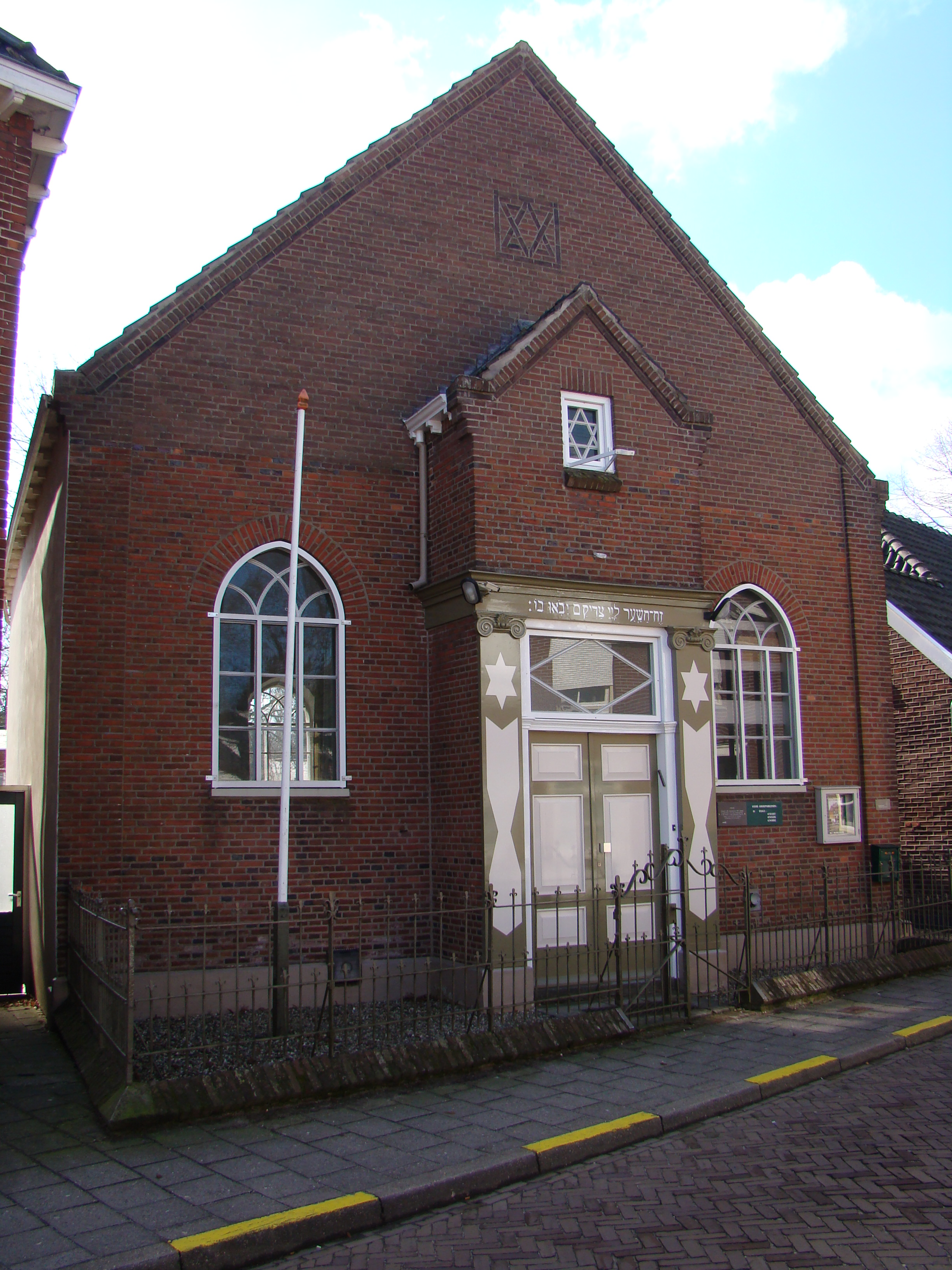
- The synagogue in 2011

- Location of the synagogue in the Gelderland

Religion
- Affiliation: Judaism
- Rite: Nusach Ashkenaz
- Ecclesiastical or organizational status: Synagogue (1857–WWII); Disuse (1950s–1986); Synagogue (since 1986); Jewish museum
- Status: Active

Location
- Location: Stationsstraat 7, Aalten, Gelderland
- Country: The Netherlands
- Interactive map of Aalten Synagogue
- Coordinates: 51°55′32″N 6°34′48″E

Architecture
- Type: Synagogue architecture
- Completed: 1857; 1986 (restoration)
- Materials: Brick

Website
- synagoge-aalten.nl (in Dutch)

The Aalten Synagogue is a Jewish congregation and synagogue, located at Stationsstraat 7, in the city of Aalten, in the Gelderland province of the Netherlands. The synagogue was completed in 1857, fell into disuse after World War II, was subsequently restored and reconsecrated in 1986.

The building is a municipal monument.

== History ==
The first mention of Jewish inhabitants in Aalten dates to the late seventeenth century. Until the French occupation of the Netherlands, the number of Jews in Aalten was limited to four families living. In 1767, the Jews of Aalten opened a synagogue in a former private home. Prior to that time, they attended a home synagogue in Bredevoort.

During the mid-nineteenth century, the community grew and in 1857 the present synagogue was opened. The building has a simple layout; the architect is unknown. In 1900, the Jewish community of Bredevoort merged into that of Aalten.

During the 1930s, the Jewish population of Aalten increased due to the influx of refugees from Germany. Just over half the Jews of Aalten survived World War II by going into hiding; the remainder were deported to extermination camps and murdered there. The population of Aalten offered shelter to a large number of Jewish and non-Jewish people in hiding. At its peak, 2,500 people lived in hiding out of a population of 13,000. The local Reformed community raised money to help them. Two attempts were made during the Second World War to set the synagogue on fire. The interior of the synagogue was destroyed but the Thorah scrolls and ritual objects were hidden in time to be preserved.

After the war, there were not enough Jews in Aalten to form an Orthodox minyan, and so the synagogue fell into disuse and disrepair. The building was sold to a non-profit foundation in 1984, who did several restorations to the building and re-consecrated the synagogue in 1986. In 2000, during the 150th anniversary of the synagogue's construction, a plaque was unveiled bearing the names of all the Jews of Aalten who died during the war. In 2005, a new Torah scroll, made in Israel by Josef Giat, was introduced. Today, the synagogue is open for religious services on special occasions and functions more as a Jewish museum.

== See also ==
- History of the Jews in the Netherlands
- List of synagogues in the Netherlands
