= Dinxperlo =

Dinxperlo Dinsper (Achterhoeks)
- Town and former municipality
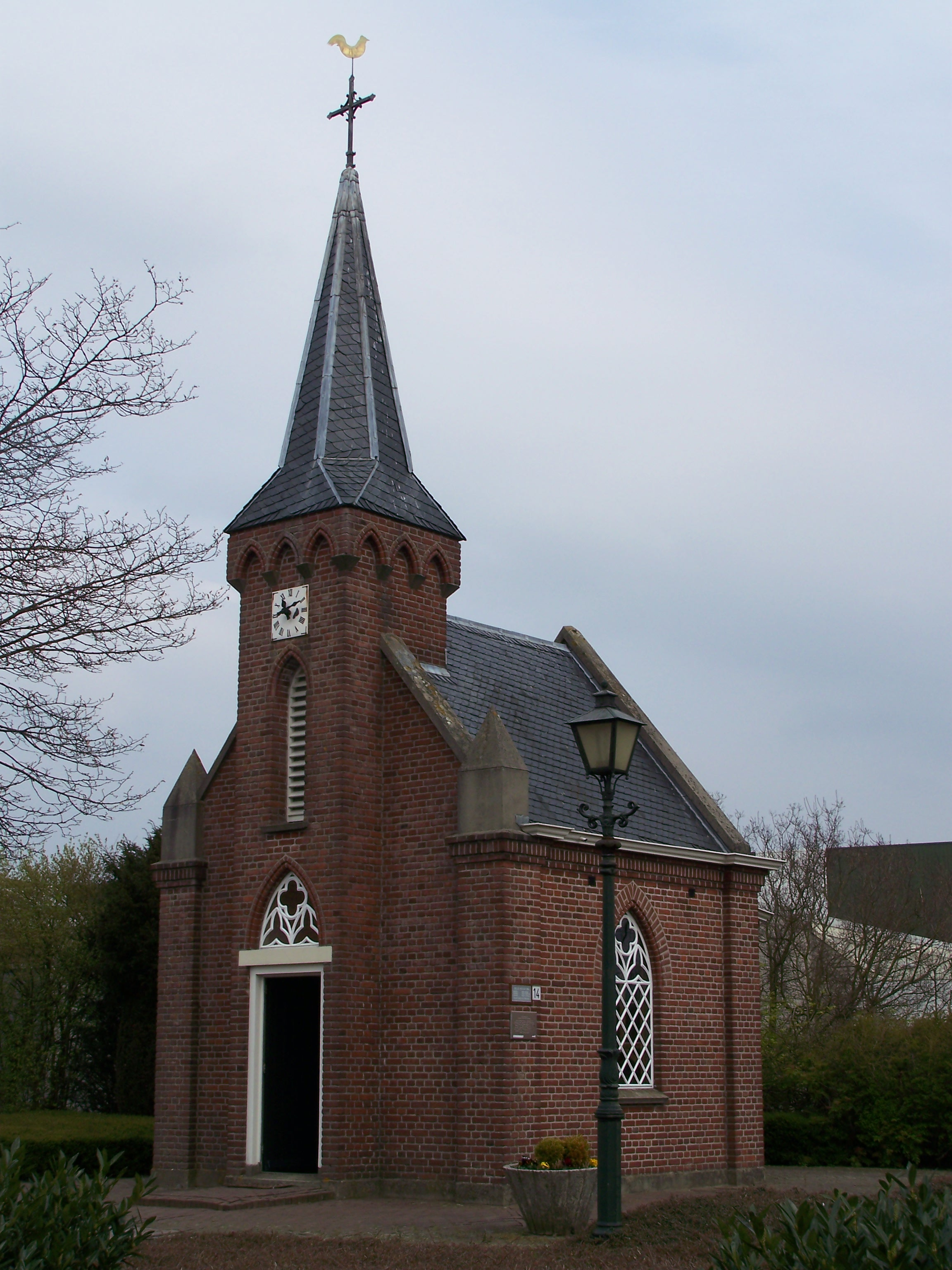
- Church "De Rietstap": the smallest church in the Netherlands

- Flag Coat of arms

- Location in the province of Gelderland in the Netherlands Dinxperlo (Netherlands)
- Coordinates: 51°51′45″N 6°29′14″E
- Country: Netherlands
- Province: Gelderland
- Municipality: Aalten

Area
  - Total: 13.76 km^{2} (5.31 sq mi)
- Elevation: 18 m (59 ft)

Population (2021)
  - Total: 8,240
  - Density: 599/km^{2} (1,550/sq mi)
- Time zone: UTC+1 (CET)
  - Summer (DST): UTC+2 (CEST)
- Postal code: 7091
- Dialing code: 0315

Dinxperlo (Dutch: [ˈdɪŋkspərloː]; Dutch Low Saxon: Dinsper) is a town and former municipality in the eastern Netherlands (Achterhoek region), situated directly at the Germany-Netherlands border.

Since 1 January 2005, Dinxperlo has been part of the municipality of Aalten. Before 2005, Dinxperlo was a separate municipality, covering the town of Dinxperlo itself and the village of De Heurne.

The name of the village probably is derived from dingspel (justice court or area) and loo (wood). A popular explanation is that in the Middle Ages there was a court in the woods here. Dinxperlo used to have a coat of arms depicting Lady Justice.

== Attractions ==
One of the town's main attractions is the Netherlands' smallest church (Kerkje "De Rietstap"). Another is a border museum (Grenslandmuseum).

== Transportation ==
The nearest train stations are Aalten railway station and Terborg railway station, with train service operated by Arriva every half-hour. Bus number 40 connects Dinxperlo to Terborg station and bus number 196 connects Dinxperlo to Aalten station. Both services start in the Willem van Oranjeplein. The service runs from Arnhem (Arnhem railway station) to Doetinchem and Winterswijk stopping at various places on the way.

== Dutch-German border ==
One street in Dinxperlo, Heelweg, is partly German in the village of Suderwick, (district Borken). The road itself lies in the Netherlands, but one side of the housing zone is in Germany (where it is called Hellweg). The unique boundary line is delimited by a treaty between Germany and the Netherlands signed in April 1960, which resulted in the return of Suderwick to then West Germany on 1 August 1963 after the Netherlands annexed the village soon after the Second World War as part of claims for war reparations.

The treaty also provides for the access arrangements of those living in German territory but with only access via Heelweg which is Dutch territory. The houses there belong to the small town of Suderwick, which might be translated as "southern area". Also, Dinxperlo houses a shared Dutch-German police station.

Besides Dutch and German, at both sides of the border a common dialect is spoken, which is a variety of Low Saxon.

== Gallery ==
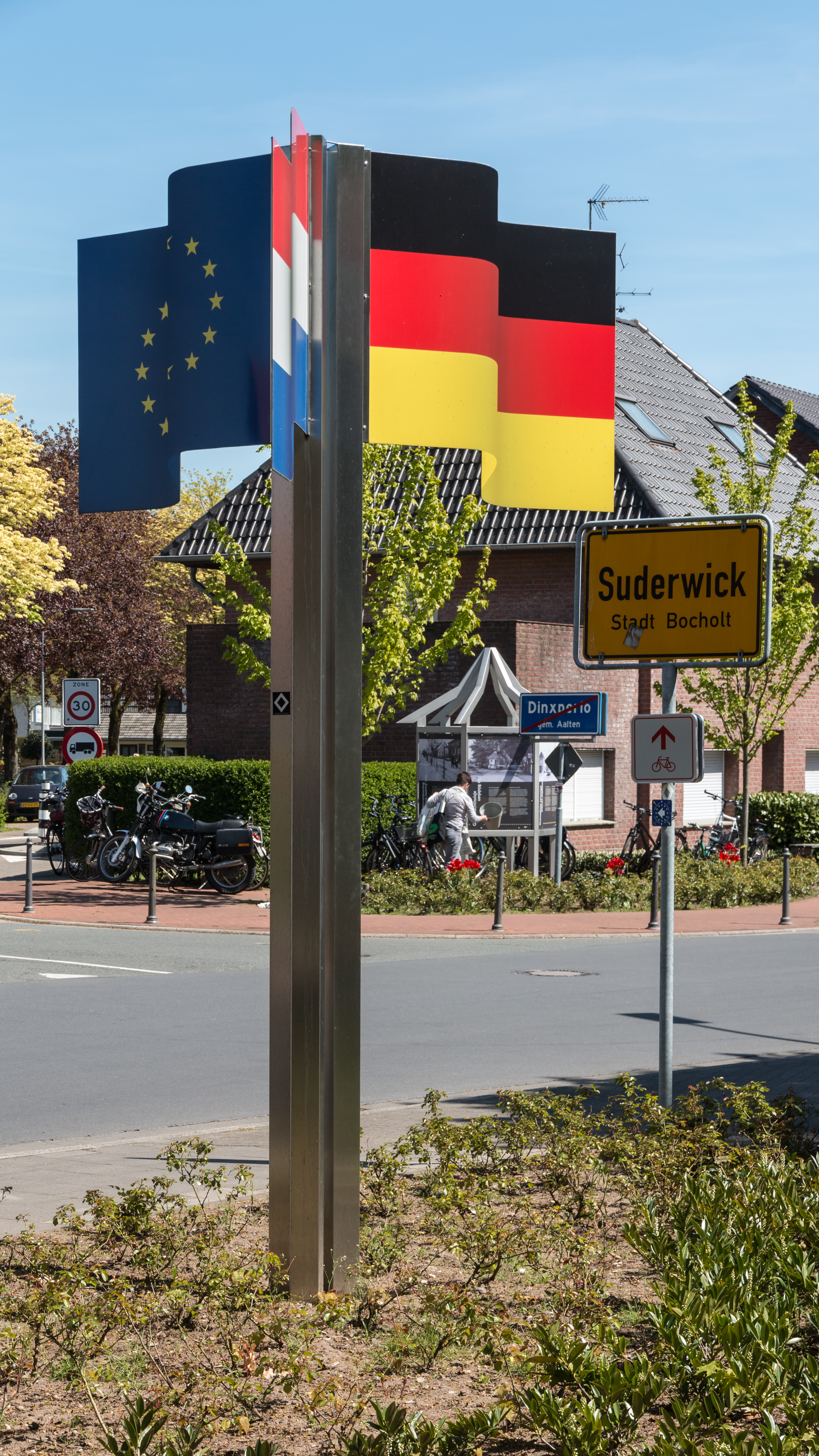
Dinxperlo, sculpture of flags

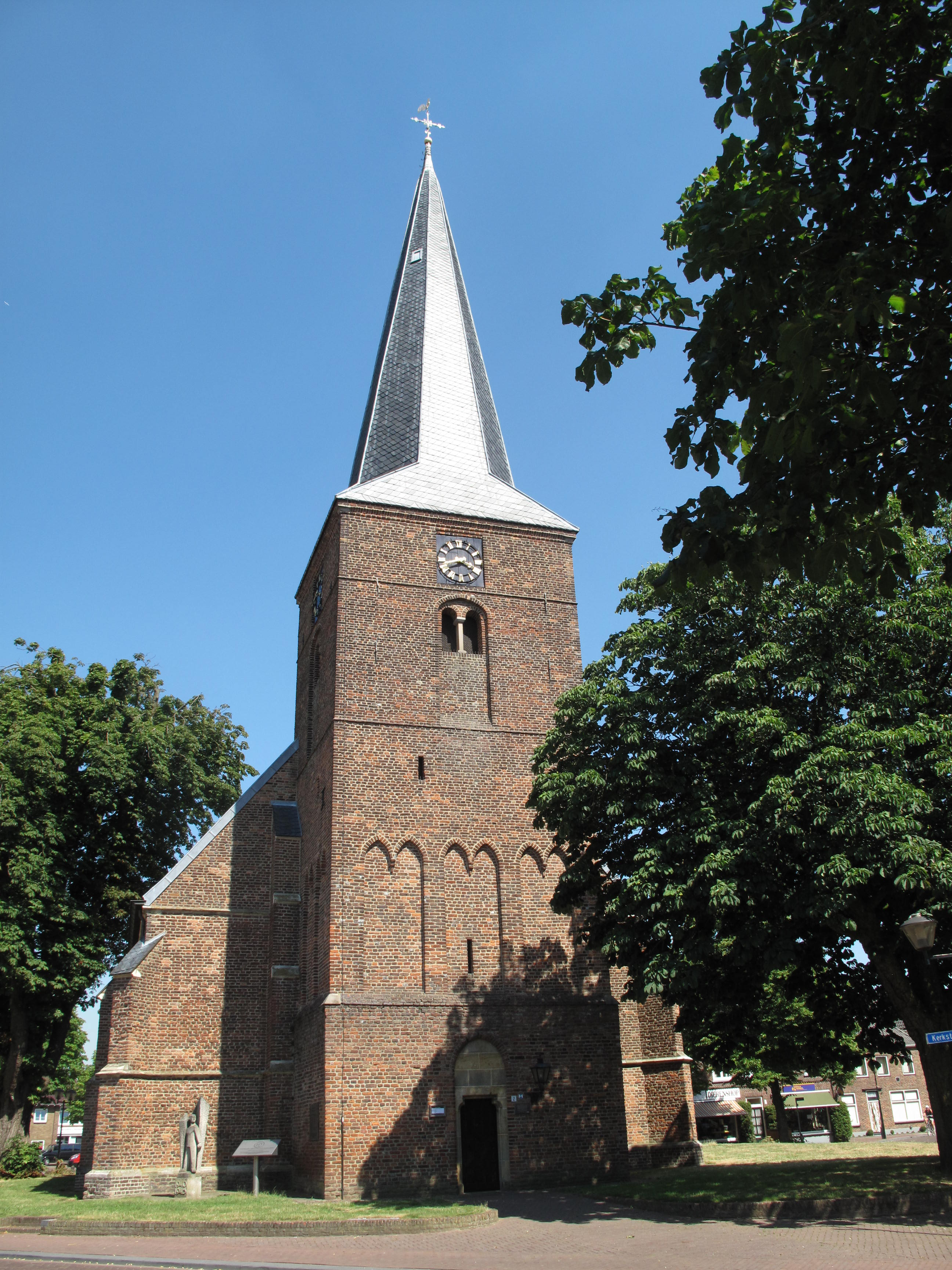
Dinxperlo, church

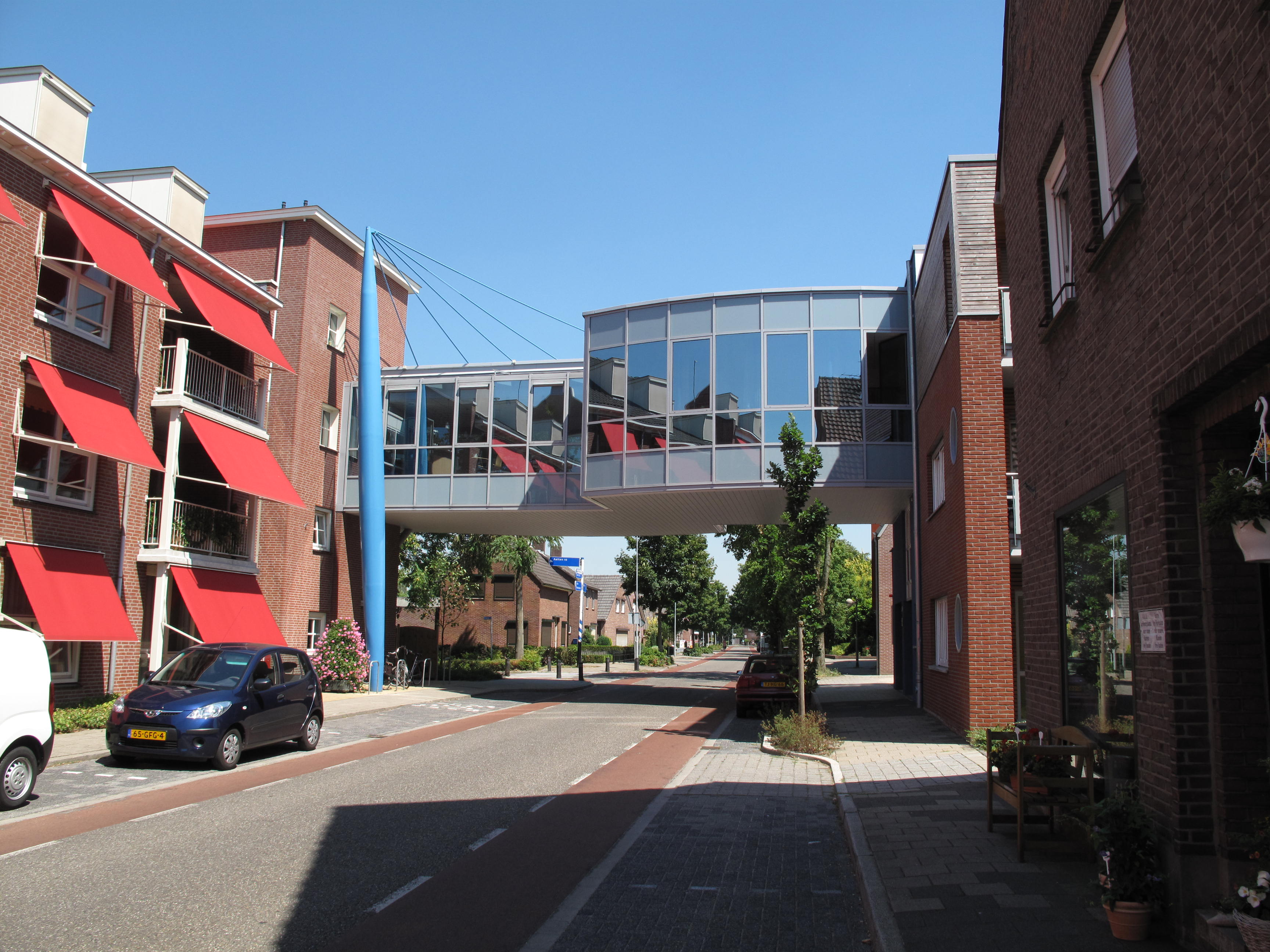
Dinxperlo, Heelweg (exactly at the border)
