= Bredevoort =

Bredevoort Brevoort (Achterhoeks)
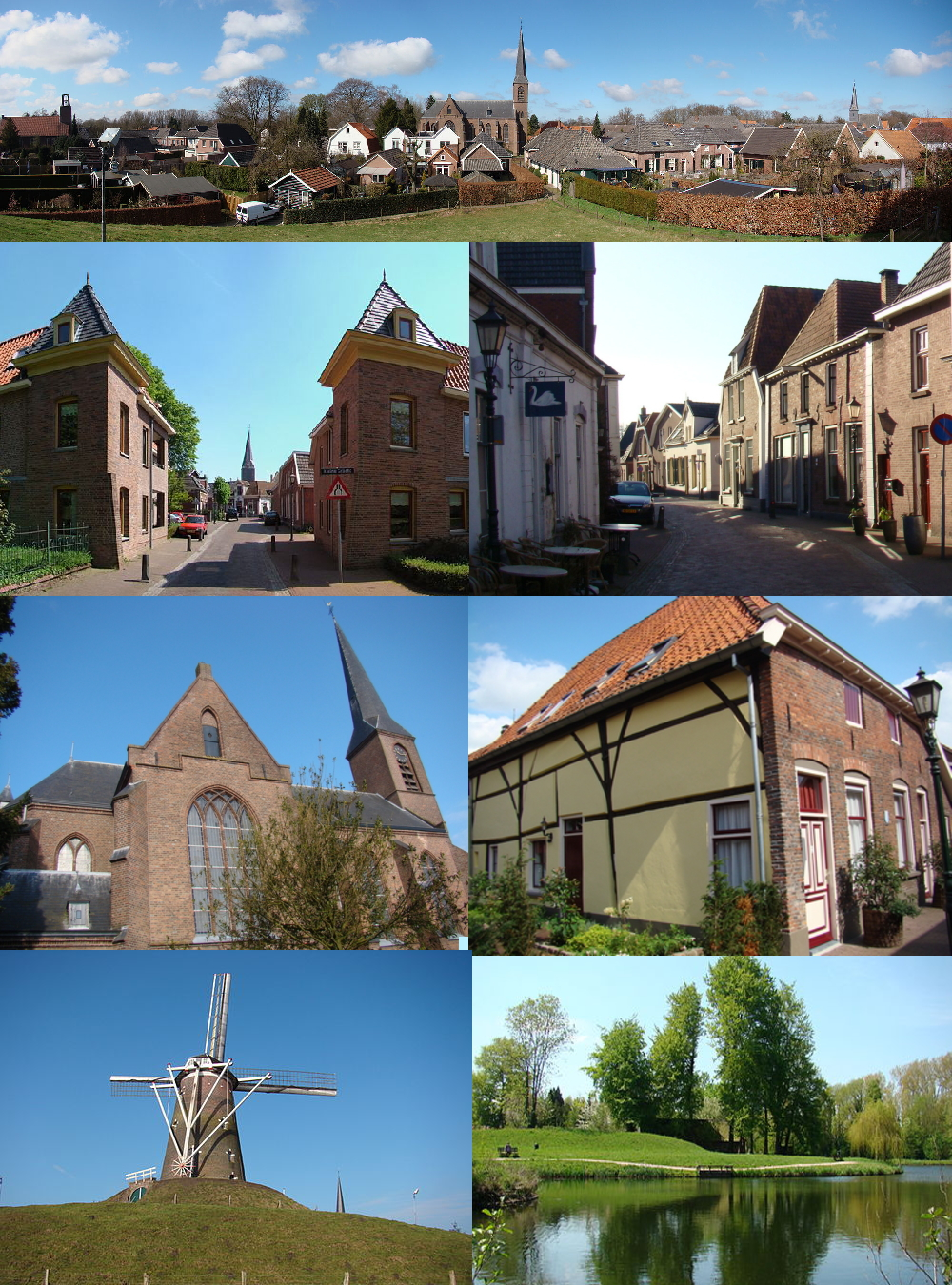

- Flag Coat of arms

- Location in the province of Gelderland in the Netherlands Bredevoort (Netherlands)
- Country: Netherlands
- Province: Gelderland
- Municipality: Aalten

Area
  - Total: 6.73 km^{2} (2.60 sq mi)
- Elevation: 35 m (115 ft)

Population (2021)
  - Total: 1,660
  - Density: 247/km^{2} (639/sq mi)
- Time zone: UTC+1 (CET)
  - Summer (DST): UTC+2 (CEST)
- Postal code: 7121 & 7126
- Dialing code: 0543
- Website: www.bredevoort.nu

Bredevoort (Low Saxon: Brevoort) is a small city with city privileges of about 1600 inhabitants in the municipality of Aalten, Netherlands. It is between the towns of Aalten and Winterswijk.

Bredevoort has presented itself as Bredevoort boekenstad (Bredevoort book town), after the examples of Hay-on-Wye in Wales and Redu in Belgium. There are now more than 20 second-hand book shops in the town.

Bredevoort was a Heerlijkheid and a separate municipality until 1818. The villages Aalten, Dinxperlo and Winterswijk included the fiefdom of Bredevoort when it became a part of Aalten in 1818.

== History ==
The name Bredevoort appears for the first time on a list of properties belonging to the archbishop of Cologne in 1188, who owned shares of the castle Bredevoort. Like Bradford in England, the name refers to a broad ford. When the count of Steinfurt tried to sell his share of the castle to the bishop of Munster and the count of Loon tried to sell his share to the count of Gelderland, a conflict broke out between the bishop and the count of Gelderland. The fight lasted for almost two centuries.

From 1326, after 4 years of battle between Reginald II, Duke of Guelders and Ludwig von Hessen the Prince-Bishopric of Münster Bredevoort was actual part of Gelderland. Between 1326 and 1697 the municipality of Bredevoort repeatedly changed ownership. The former municipality of Bredevoort was composed of the city, the castle Bredevoort, and the villages Aalten, Dinxperlo and Winterswijk. Maurice of Nassau, Prince of Orange conquered Bredevoort in the year 1597 on the Spanish occupation. The Spanish reconquered the city in 1606, but Frederick Henry, Prince of Orange liberated the garrison and citizens who had retreated in the Castle of Bredevoort. In 1646, lightning hit the gunpowder tower of the castle, causing an explosion that destroyed parts of the castle and the town, killing Lord Haersolte of Bredevoort and his family, as well as others. Only one son, Anthonie, who was not home that day, survived. In the rampjaar ("disaster year") 1672 Bernhard von Galen reconquered the city and occupied city and herrschaft for almost two years. In 1697 received William III of England the city and herrschaft from the States of Gelderland. From that day until 1795 the city and herrschaft was a personal belonging to the House of Orange-Nassau. King Willem-Alexander of the Netherlands is still Lord of Bredevoort. After centuries of war, its fortifications were demolished by its inhabitants. In 1818, the municipality of Bredevoort was dissolved to become part of the city Bredevoort under the newly formed municipality Aalten.

== Sights ==
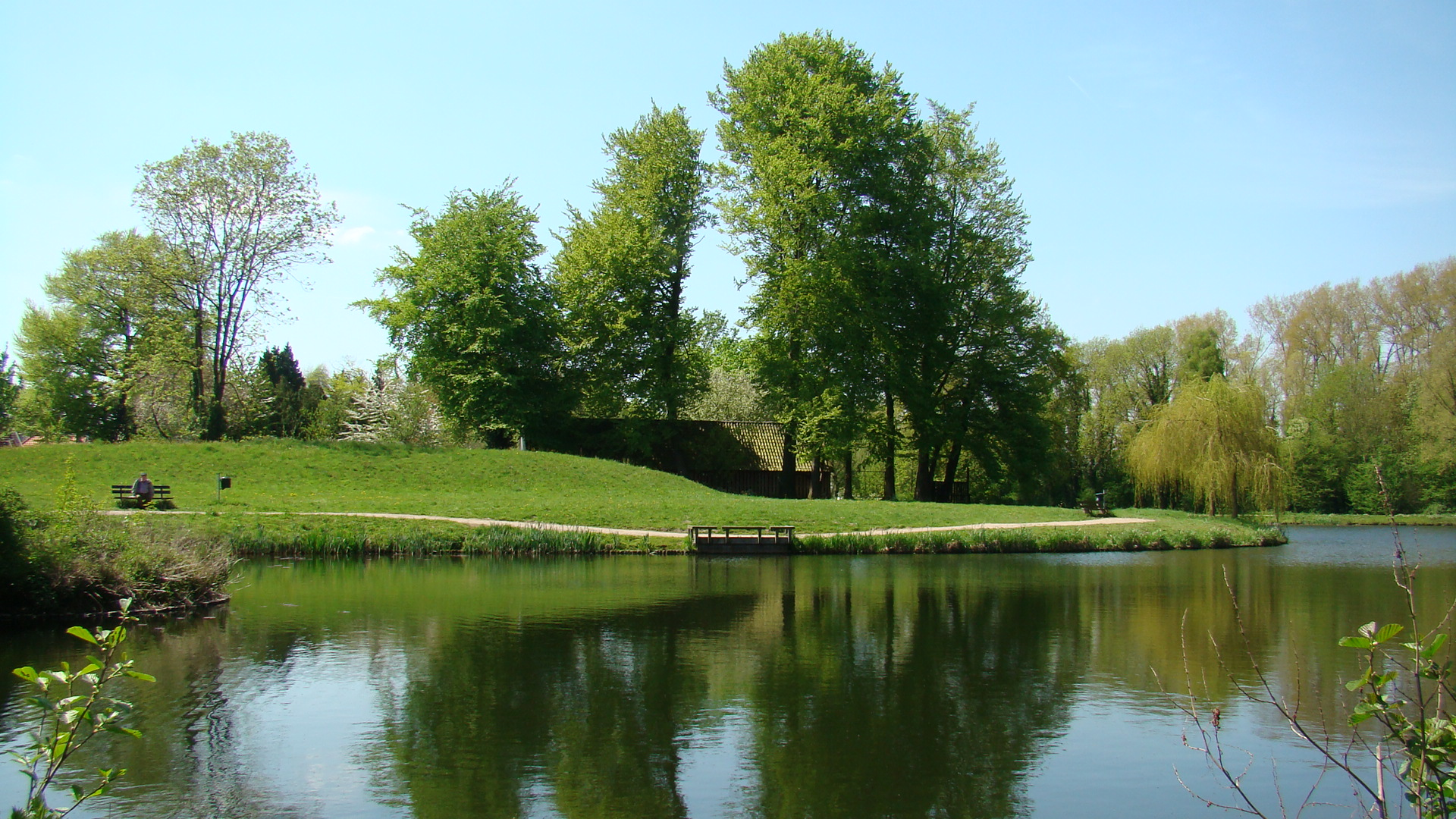
"Grote Gracht", the town ditch with remains of the former Star fort of Bredevoort

- St. Joriskerk, Gothic Church with rococo chair from 1672
- Windmill De Prins van Oranje
- Historic centre
- 19th century theehouse at the town ditch
- remains from the 17th century city gate

== Transportation ==
Aalten railway station is the nearest station. There is a half-hourly service between Arnhem and Winterswijk, which stops at this station. Arnhem railway station has half-hourly (or more) services to Amsterdam, Utrecht, Nijmegen, 's-Hertogenbosch, Breda, Tilburg and Alkmaar. If you travel to Winterswijk, you can then change onto a connecting train to Zutphen. From Zutphen you can travel to Apeldoorn, Dieren, Hengelo, Deventer and Zwolle.

To get to the station you can use bus service 191, which travels from Aalten station to Bredevoort and Lichtenvoorde.

== Gallery ==
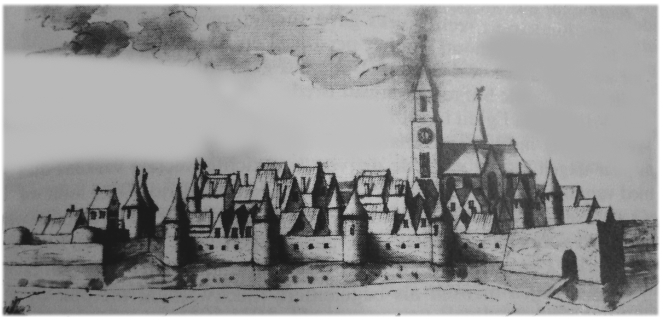

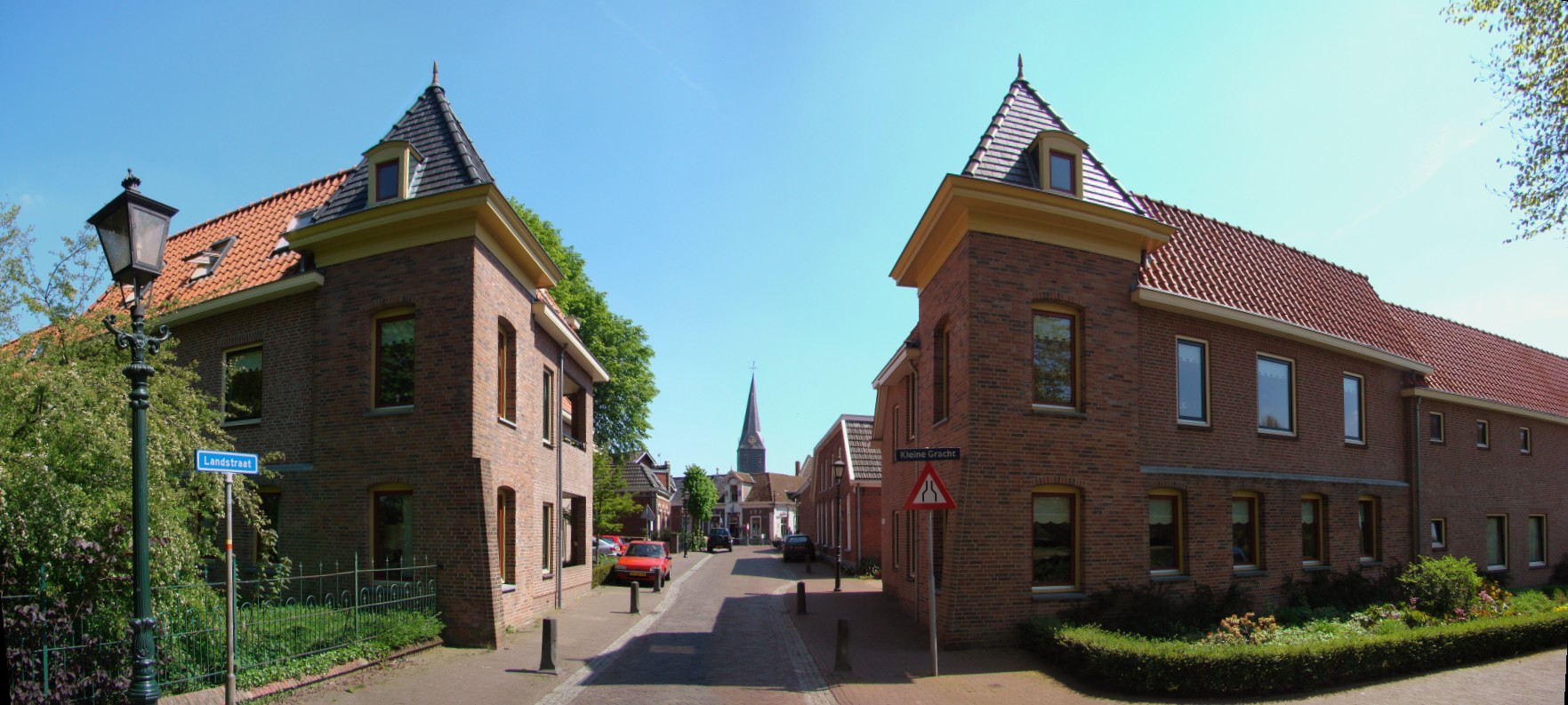

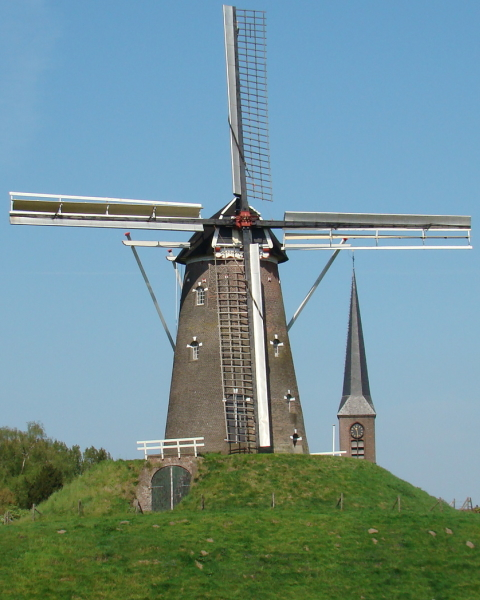

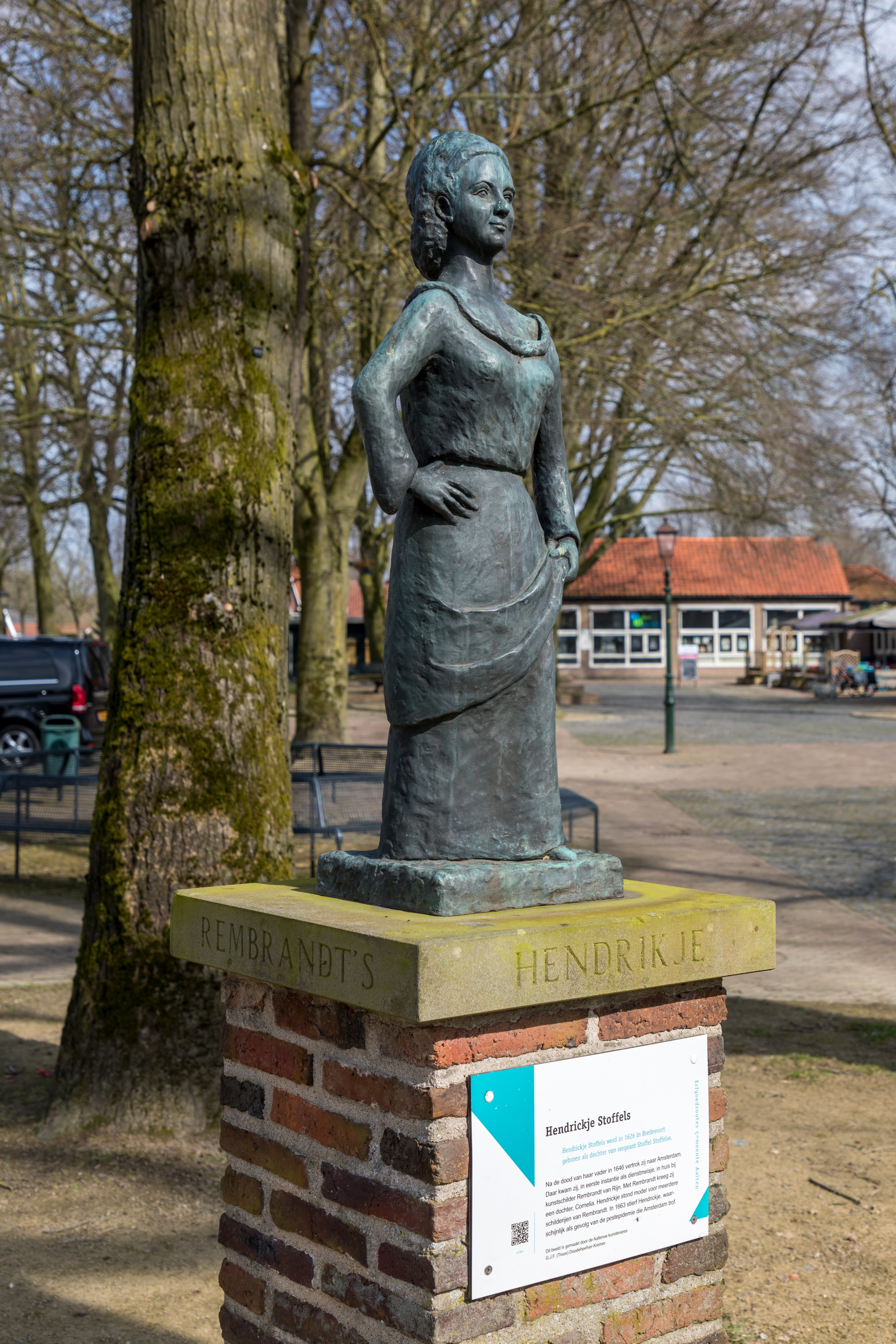

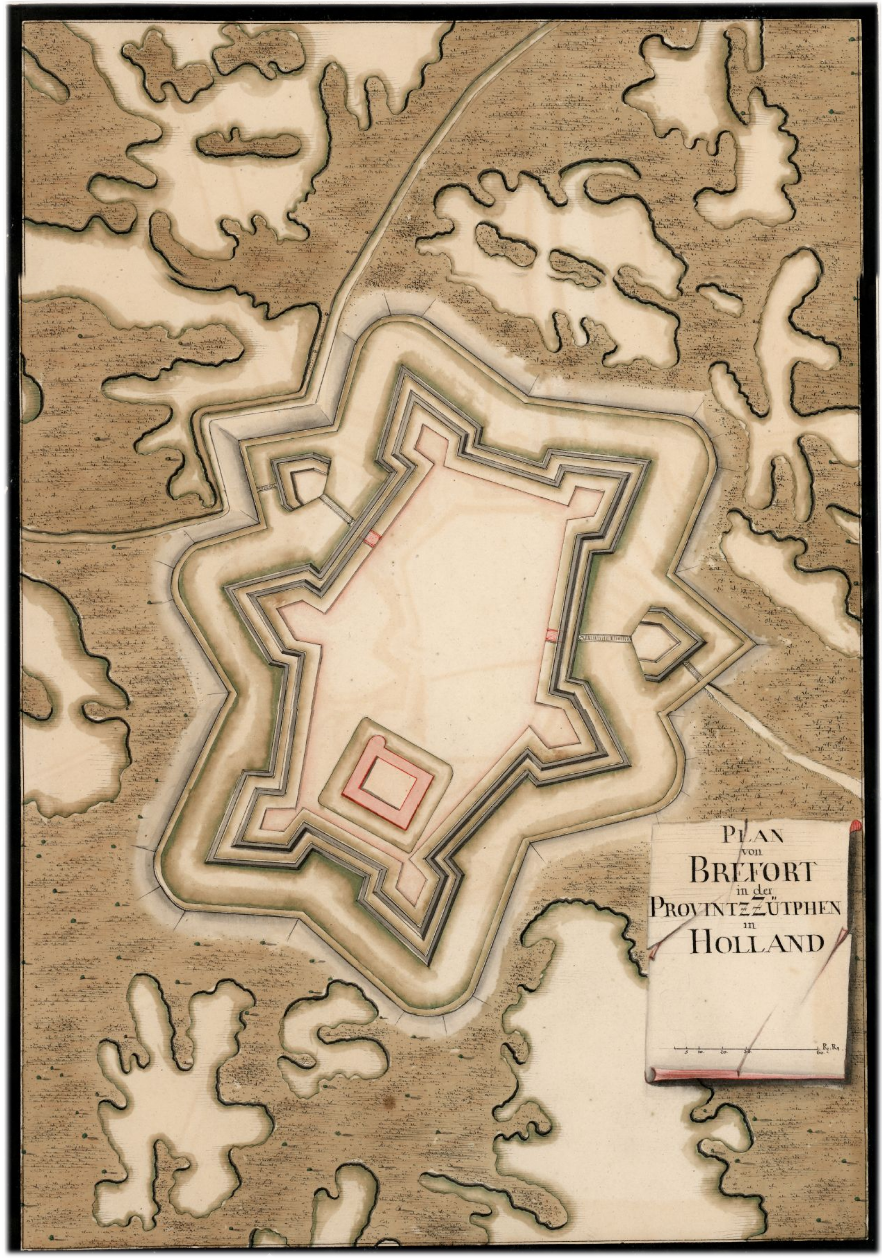

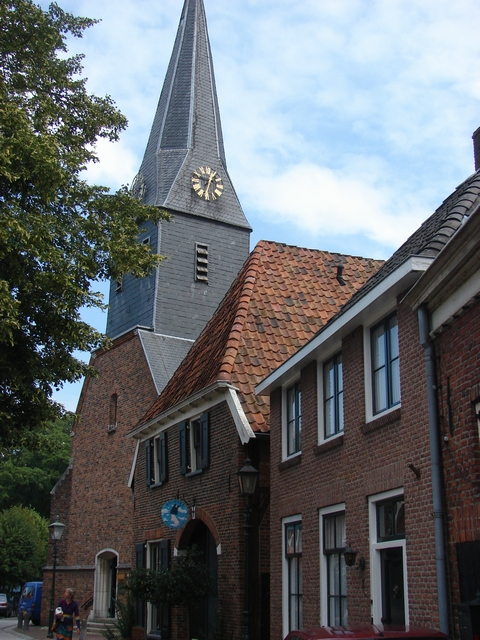

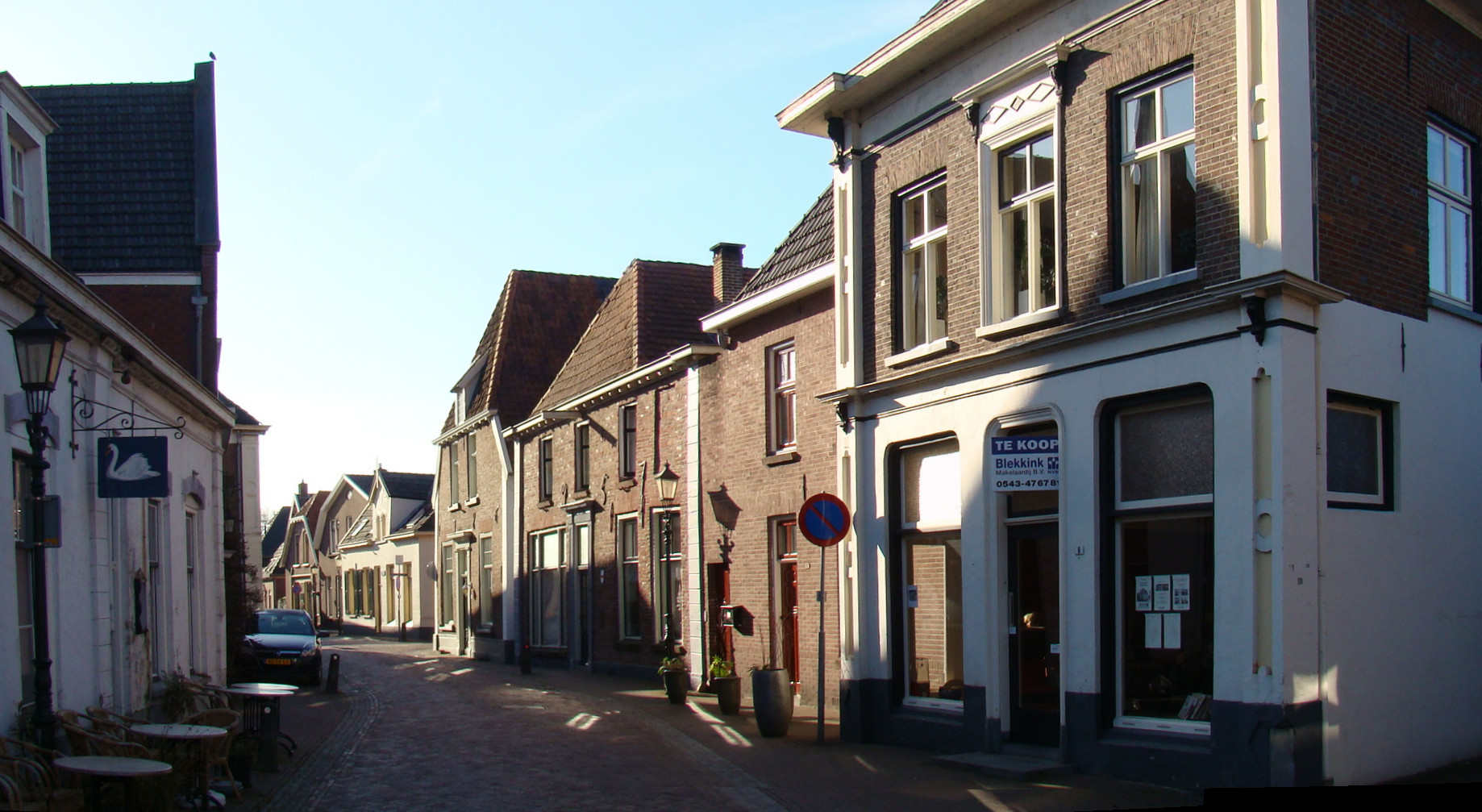

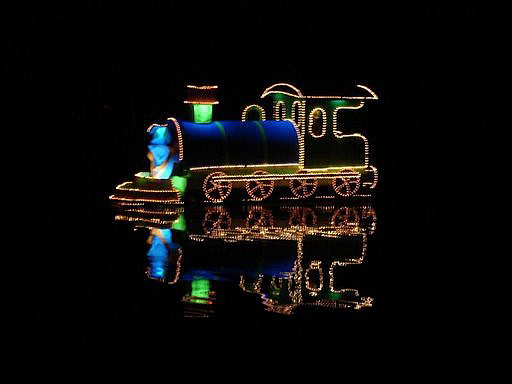
