= Aalten =

- Municipality
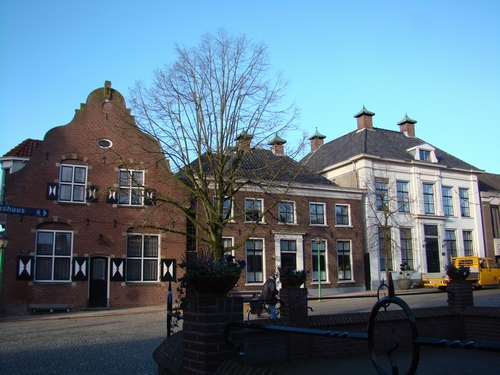
- Aalten town hall

- Flag Coat of arms

- Location in Gelderland

- Location within Gelderland Location within Netherlands Location within Europe
- Coordinates: 51°56′N 6°35′E
- Country: Netherlands
- Province: Gelderland

Government
  - Body: Municipal council
  - Mayor: Anton Stapelkamp (CU)

Area
  - Total: 97.05 km^{2} (37.47 sq mi)
  - Land: 96.54 km^{2} (37.27 sq mi)
  - Water: 0.51 km^{2} (0.20 sq mi)
- Elevation: 31 m (102 ft)
- Highest elevation: 41 m (135 ft)

Population (January 2021)
  - Total: 27,120
  - Density: 281/km^{2} (730/sq mi)
- Demonym: Aaltenaar
- Time zone: UTC+1 (CET)
  - Summer (DST): UTC+2 (CEST)
- Postcode: 7090–7095, 7120–7126
- Area code: 0315, 0543
- Website: www.aalten.nl

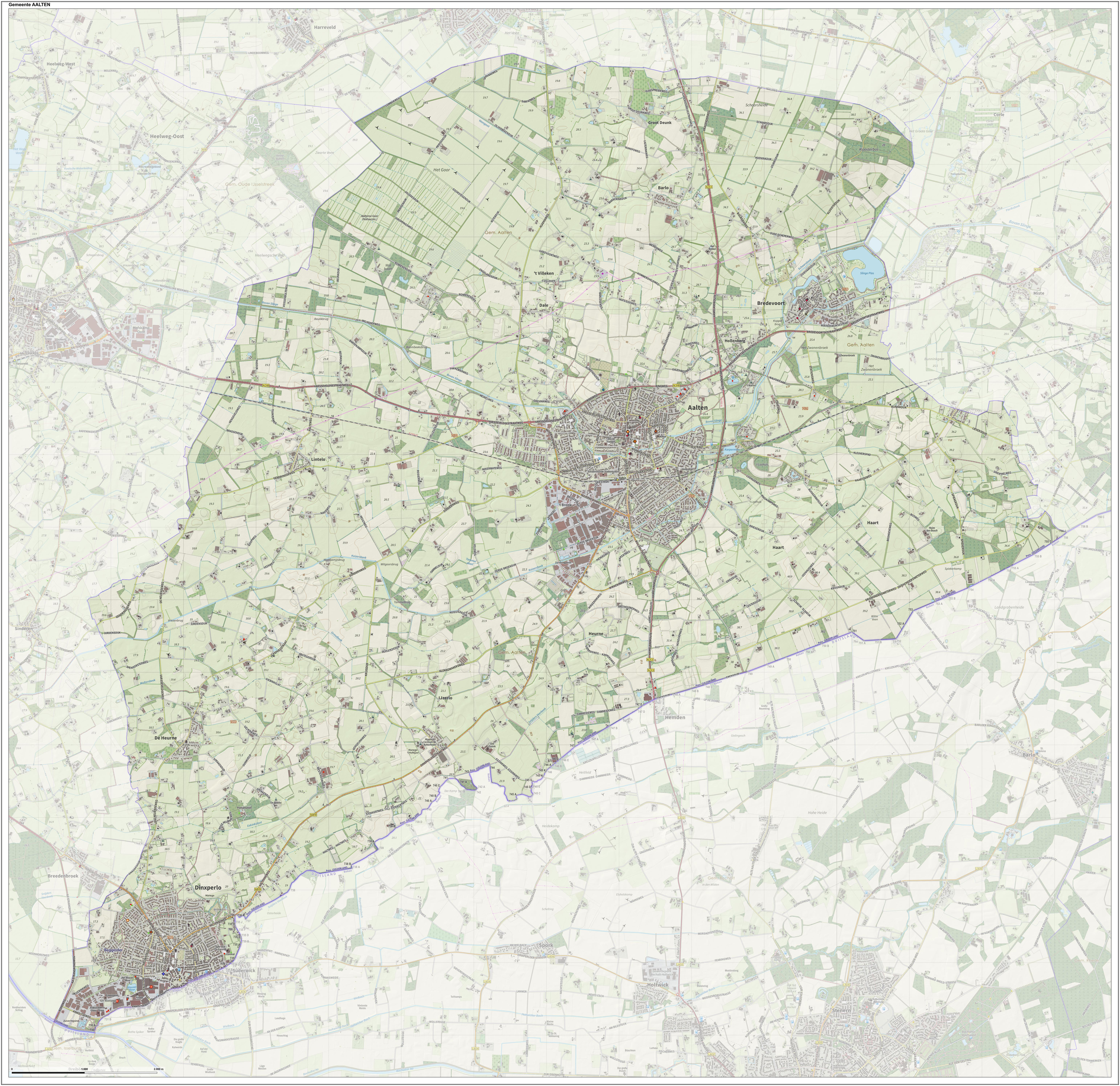
Topographic map of Aalten, June 2015

Aalten (Dutch pronunciation: [ˈaːltə(n)]) is a municipality and a town in the eastern Netherlands. The former municipalities of Bredevoort (1818) and Dinxperlo (2005) have been merged with Aalten.

Notable inhabitants of Aalten include Angus Young, guitarist of the Australian rock band AC/DC, and Robert Gesink, a professional road bicycle racer. During World War II, 51 of Aalten's 85 Jews were hidden by local non-Jews, and thereby survived the war. According to the War and Resistance Museum in Aalten, the village had the highest number of people in hiding during World War II. The village of approximately 13,000 residents hid some 2,500 people.

== Transportation ==
Aalten railway station serves Aalten and the surrounding area. There is a half-hourly service between Arnhem and Winterswijk, which stops at this station. Arnhem railway station has services to Amsterdam, Amsterdam Airport, Utrecht, Nijmegen, 's-Hertogenbosch, Breda, Tilburg and to cities in Germany.

Aalten also has an hourly bus service to Ruurlo and to Zelhem.

== Notable people ==
- Hendrickje Stoffels (1626 in Bredevoort – 1663) the longtime partner of Rembrandt
- J.T. Wamelink (1827 in Aalten – 1900) a prominent musician and composer in Cleveland, Ohio
- Vinus van Baalen (1942 in Dinxperlo – 2012) a Dutch swimmer, competed at the 1964 Summer Olympics
- Nout Wellink (born 1943 in Bredevoort) a Dutch economist and former central banker

== Gallery ==
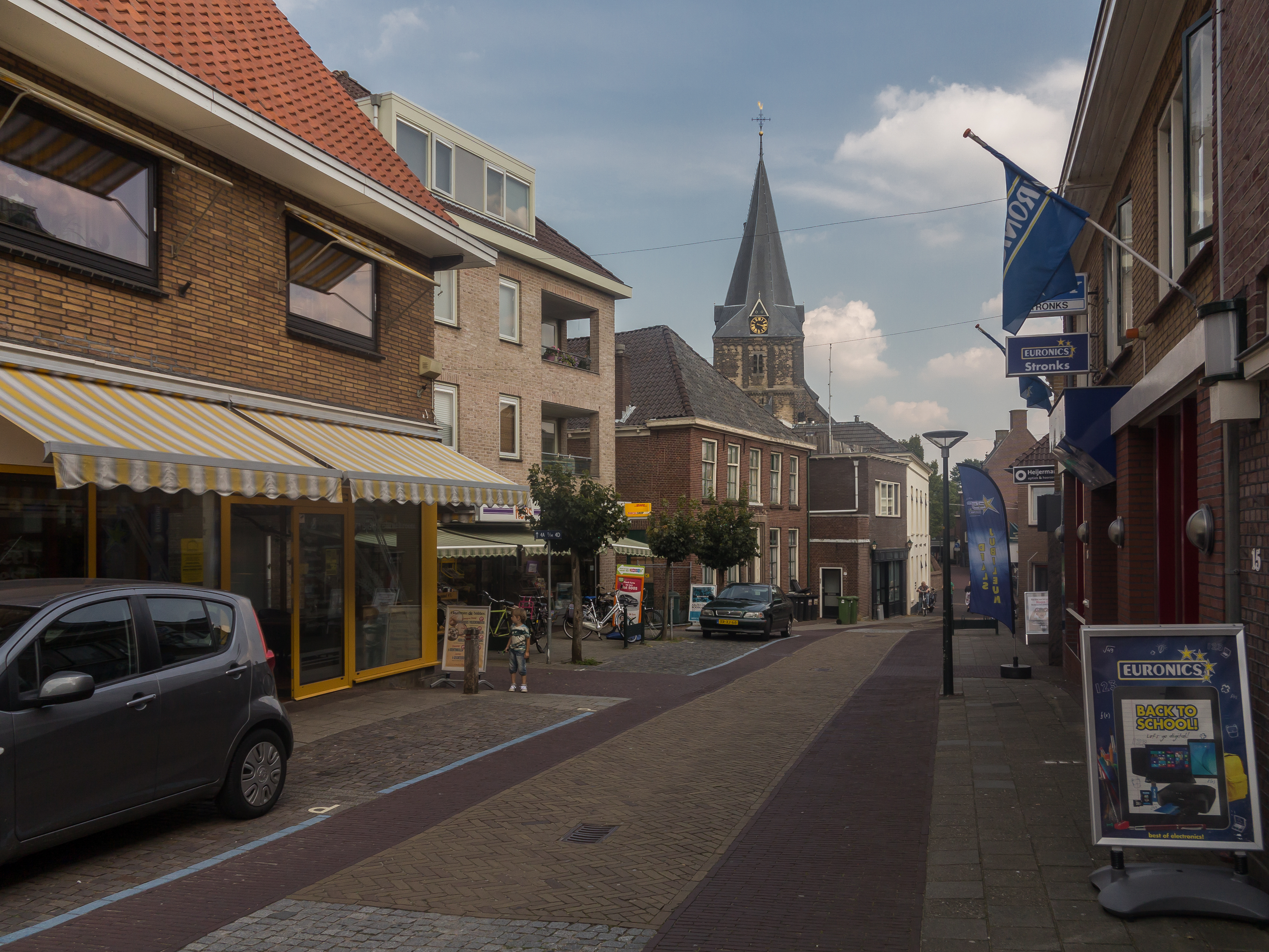

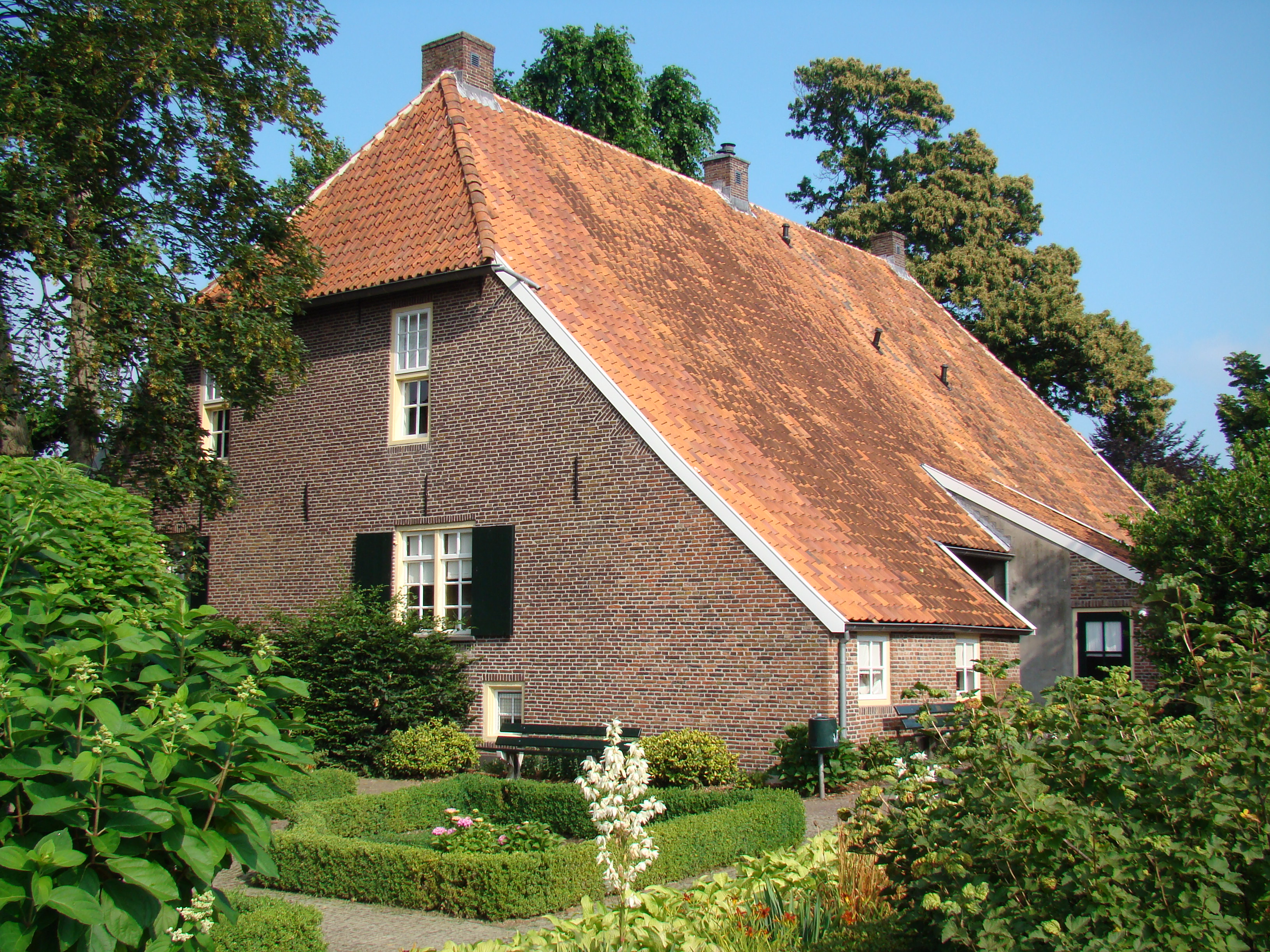

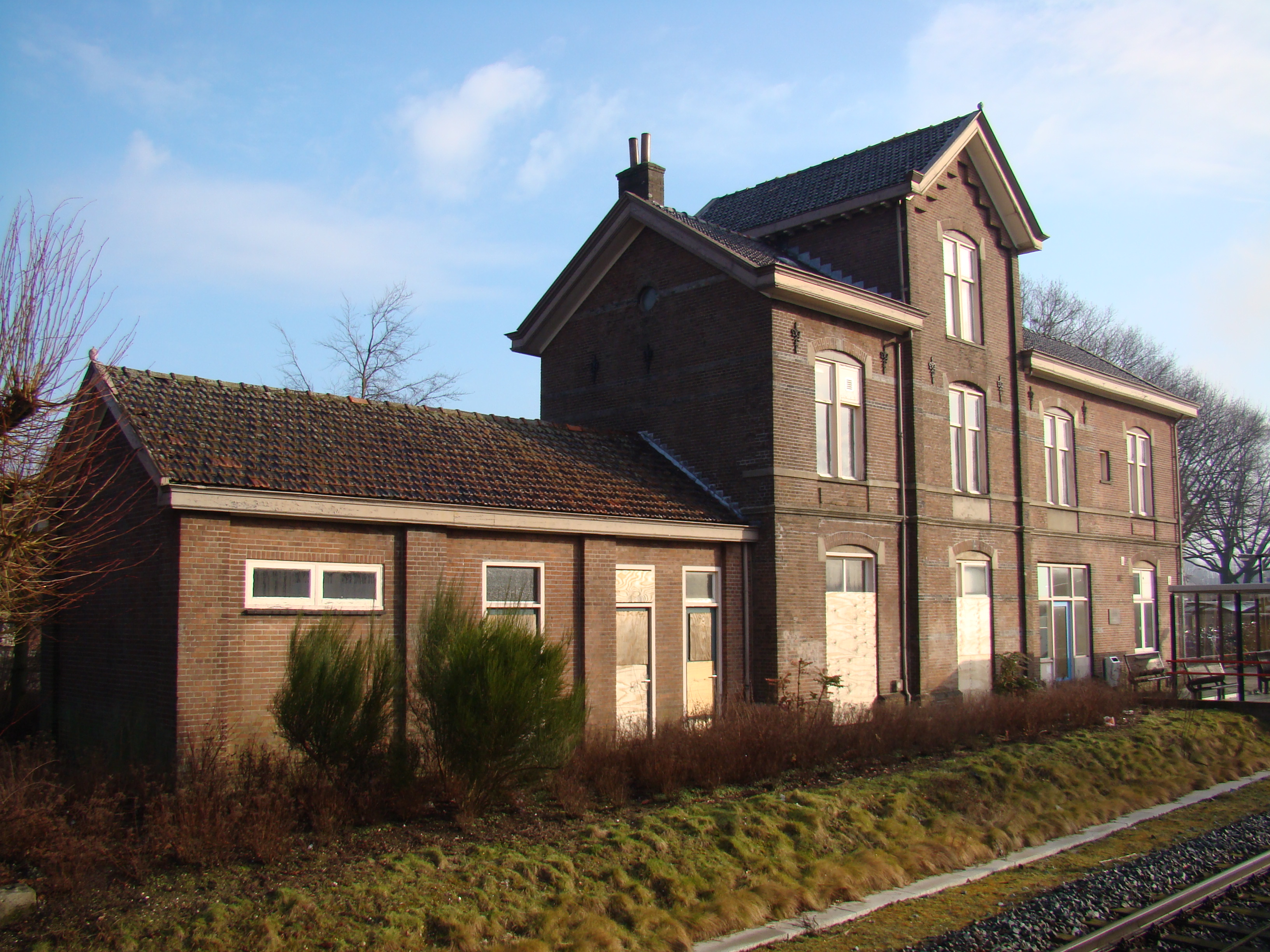

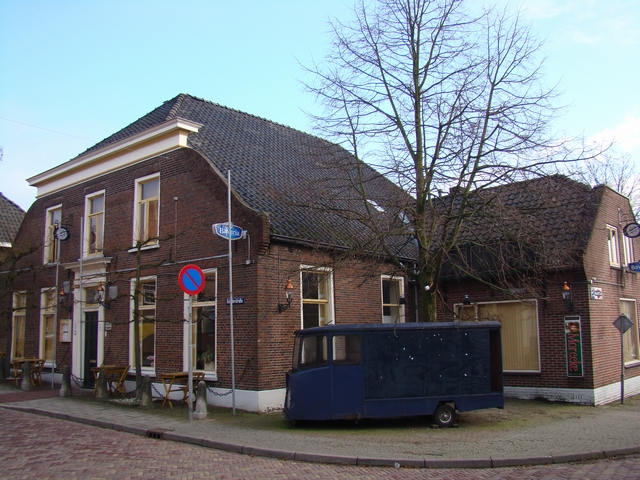

== See also ==
- Aalten Synagogue
- Barlo
- Bredevoort
- Dale
- De Heurne
- Dinxperlo
- Haart
- Heurne
- Hollenberg
- IJzerlo
- 't Klooster
- Lintelo
- Municipalities of the Netherlands
- The Holocaust in the Netherlands
- Transportation in the Netherlands
