= Aalten railway station =

Railway station in Aalten, the Netherlands

Aalten
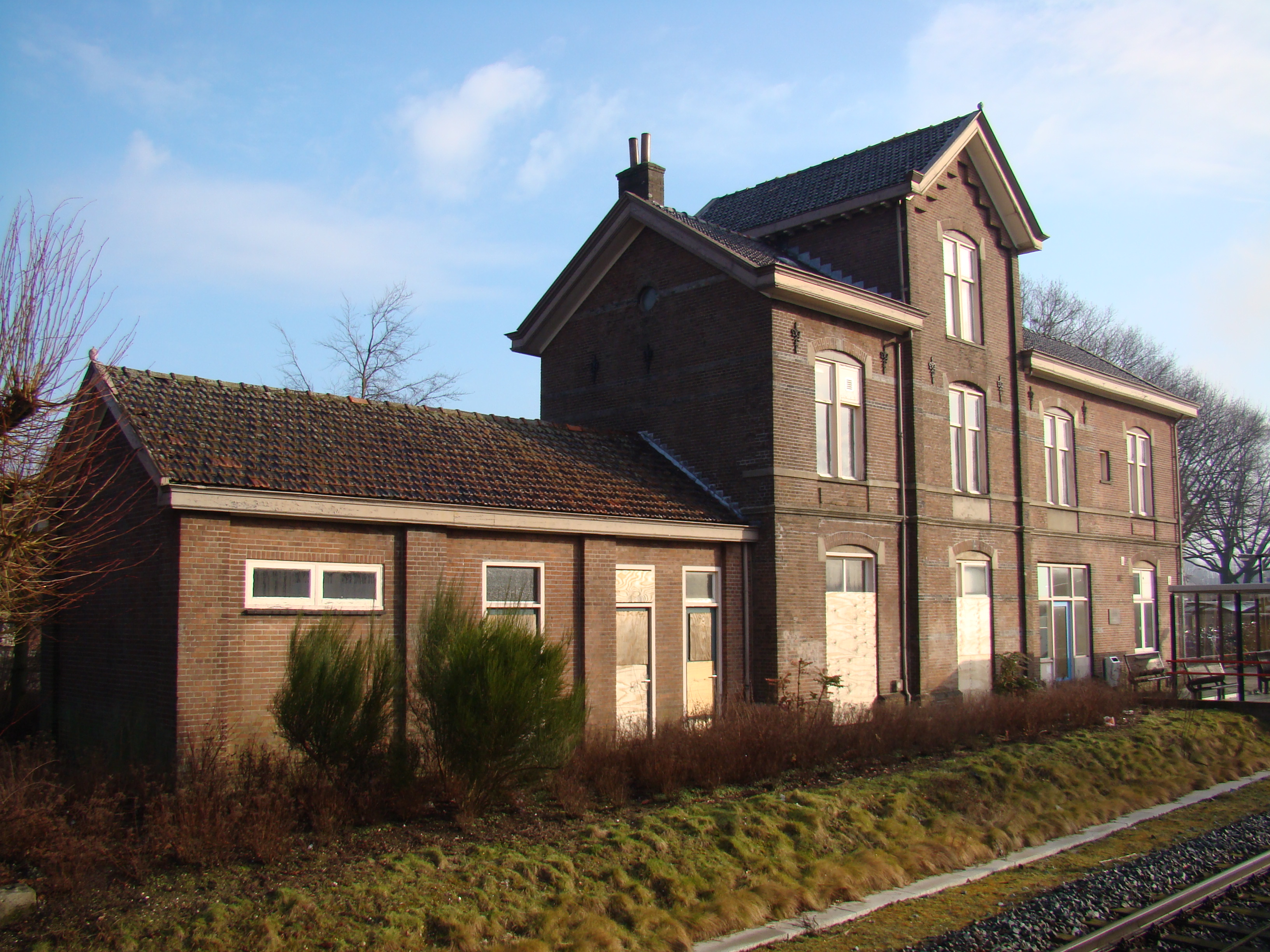

General information
- Location: Netherlands
- Coordinates: 51°55′16″N 6°34′41″E
- Line: Winterswijk–Zevenaar railway

History
- Opened: 1885

Services
Preceding station	Arriva Netherlands	Following station
Varsseveld towards Arnhem Centraal	Stoptrein 30900	Winterswijk Terminus
Location
- Location within Netherlands

Aalten is a railway station located in Aalten, Netherlands. The station is on the Winterswijk–Zevenaar railway and the station opened on 15 July 1885. The building began construction in 1884 and was finished in 1885. It was rebuilt in 1919 and has since remained unaltered. It was briefly closed from 15-8-1945 until 20-10-1945. The service is now operated by Arriva.

== Train services ==
Route	Service type	Operator	Notes
Arnhem - Doetinchem - Winterswijk	Local ("Sprinter")	Arriva	2x per hour (only 1x per hour after 20:00, on Saturday mornings and Sundays)

== Bus services ==
Line	Route	Operator	Notes
C11	Aalten - Bocholt, Bustreff - Bocholt, station	Stadtbus Bocholt	no service Saturday afternoons and Sundays. Only German tickets valid
191	Aalten - Bredevoort - Barlo - Lichtenvoorde - Lievelde - Lichtenvoorde - Zieuwent - Marienvelde - Ruurlo	Arriva	On evenings and weekends, this bus only operates if called one hour before its supposed departure ("belbus") and only between Aalten and Mariënvelde and Zieuwent and Ruurlo.
194	Aalten - Lintelo - De Heurne - Dinxperlo - Breedenbroek - Sinderen - Varsseveld - Halle - Zelhem	Arriva	On evenings and weekends, this bus only operates if called one hour before its supposed departure ("belbus") .
694	Dinxperlo → De Heurne → Lintelo → Aalten → Lichtenvoorde	Gelderesch	Only 1 run during morning rush hour.
