= Achterhoek =

Coordinates: 52°0′15.58″N 6°23′48.44″E

Achterhoek Achterhook (Dutch Low Saxon)
- Cultural region of Gelderland
- Flag
- Nickname: De Graafschap
- Location in Gelderland
- Country: Netherlands

Area
  - Total: 1,476 km^{2} (570 sq mi)

Population (2015)
  - Total: 389,682
  - Density: 264.0/km^{2} (683.8/sq mi)
- Demonym: Achterhoekers

The Achterhoek (Dutch: [ˈɑxtərɦuk]; Achterhoeks: Achterhook) is a cultural region and COROP area in the Eastern Netherlands. Its name (meaning "rear-corner") is geographically appropriate because the area lies in the easternmost part of the province of Gelderland and therefore in the east of the Netherlands, protruding into Germany. The Achterhoek lies at the east of the IJssel. On the other sides, it borders Germany to the southeast and the province of Overijssel to the northeast.

In 2015, the Achterhoek had a population of 389,682. The region is also called de Graafschap (Dutch for earldom, shire or county; namesake of VBV De Graafschap in Doetinchem) because it coincides with the historical County of Zutphen. The region is predominantly rural, with much open space, forests and farms. The area around the town of Winterswijk is regarded as noteworthy. A well-known beer originates from this region: Grolsch beer was first brewed in Groenlo in 1615.

== Language ==
The original languages of the Achterhoek are Achterhooks and Kleverlandish, varieties of Low Saxon and (classified as Low Franconian dialects). The language can also differ per municipality or town, even in such a way that a person speaking the 'Grols' variant (meaning the dialect of Groenlo) will pronounce words differently from a person from Winterswijk which is merely 10 km (6.2 mi) to the east, although they will probably understand each other.

The number of inhabitants whose sole language is Achterhooks has greatly declined since World War II. People in the Achterhoek are raised with Dutch at school and the dialect is only spoken (sometimes) at home. Partly due to immigration from outside the region and the effects of national policy, the Dutch language is having a significant impact on the dialect. Many old words have been forgotten and replaced by their Dutch-derived equivalents.

== Economy ==
Export Products

- Export value of 20%: meat, dairy, fruits, and other crops.
- Potatoes, among others, by Aviko.
- Animal feeds, among others, by ForFarmers.
- Technological products (such as Nedap) with over 25% export value.

== Tourism ==
The downsizing of agriculture has contributed to the emergence of rural tourism within the region. The area is popular among those seeking peace or an active vacation. Various activities such as cycling (such as the 80-year-war route, Arfgoodroute), hiking, horseback riding, Nordic walking, carriage rides, canoeing, and hot air ballooning, as well as stays at recreation lakes, such as Stroombroek, Slingeplas, and Hilgelo, are popular among tourists. Doetinchem, Braamt, Bronkhorst and Zutphen are the most popular tourist destinations.

The majority of tourists visiting the Achterhoek region are from other European countries, including Germany, Belgium, Denmark, and Ireland.

== Municipalities ==
The largest cities in the Achterhoek are Doetinchem, Winterswijk and Zutphen. Doesburg and Zutphen are old Hanseatic cities. Both have centres with well-preserved historical buildings.

- Aalten
- Berkelland
- Bronckhorst
- Brummen
- Doesburg
- Doetinchem
- Lochem
- Montferland (also considered part of Liemers region locally)
- Oost Gelre
- Oude IJsselstreek
- Winterswijk
- Zutphen
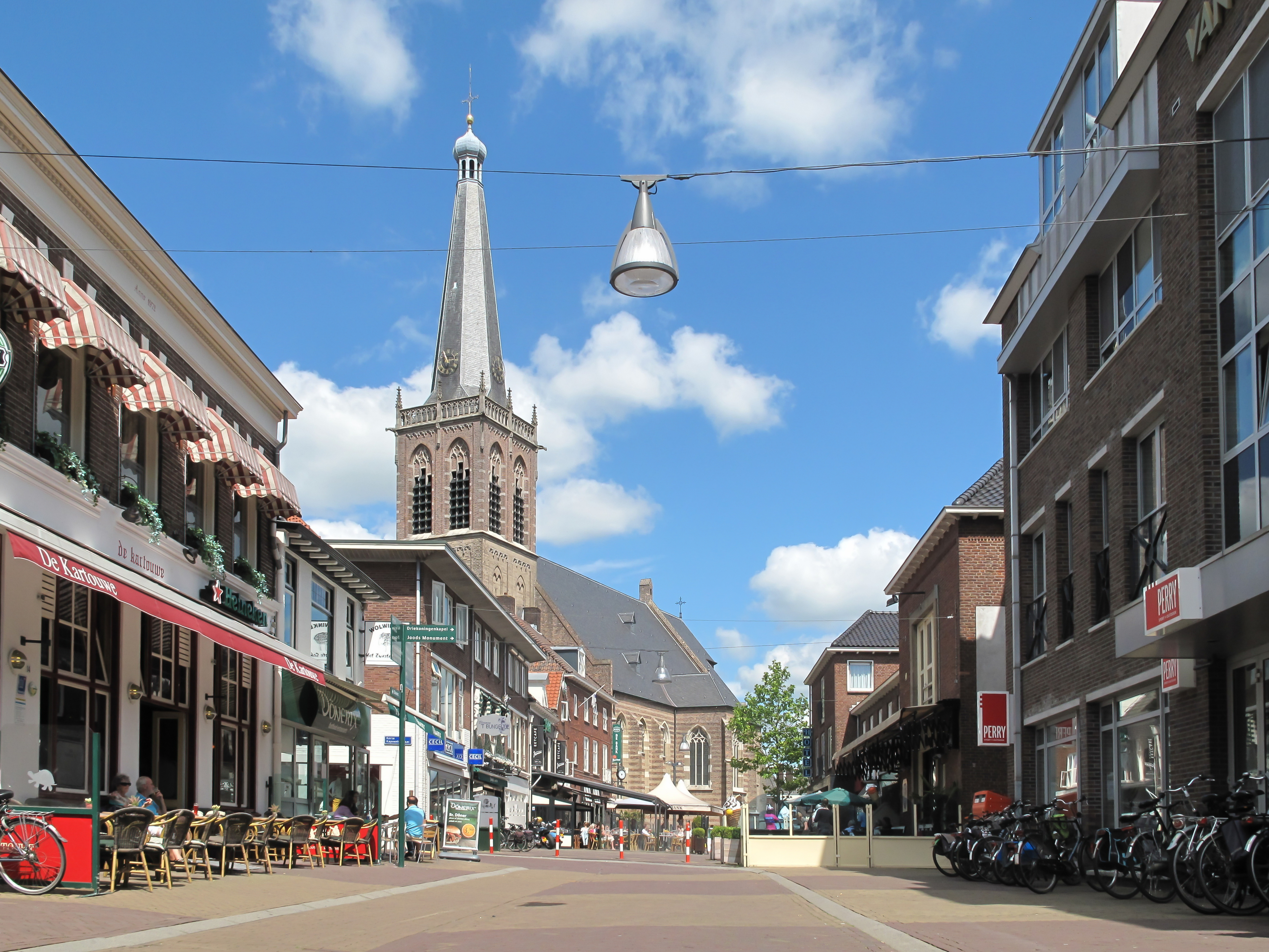
Doetinchem

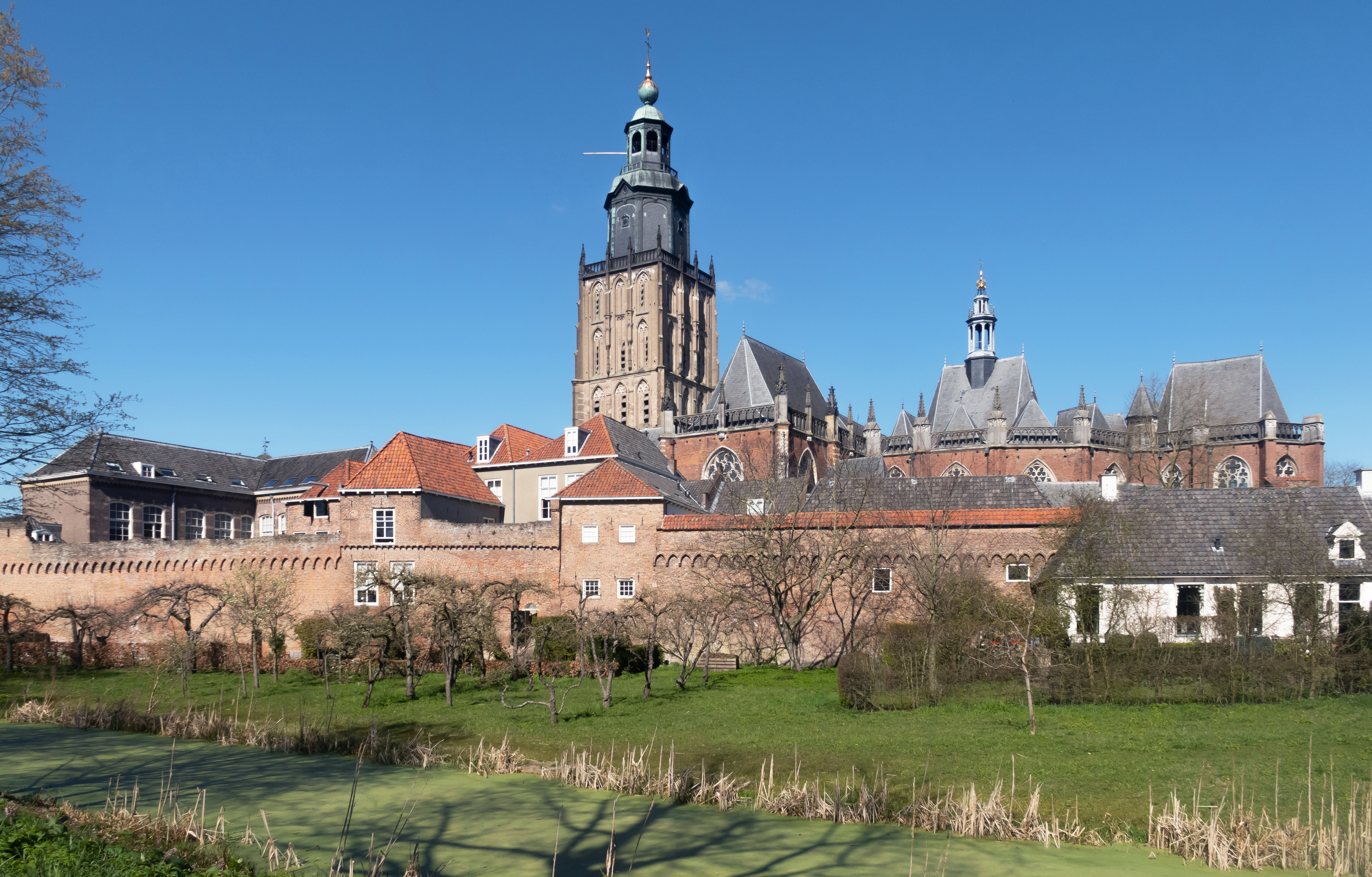
Zutphen

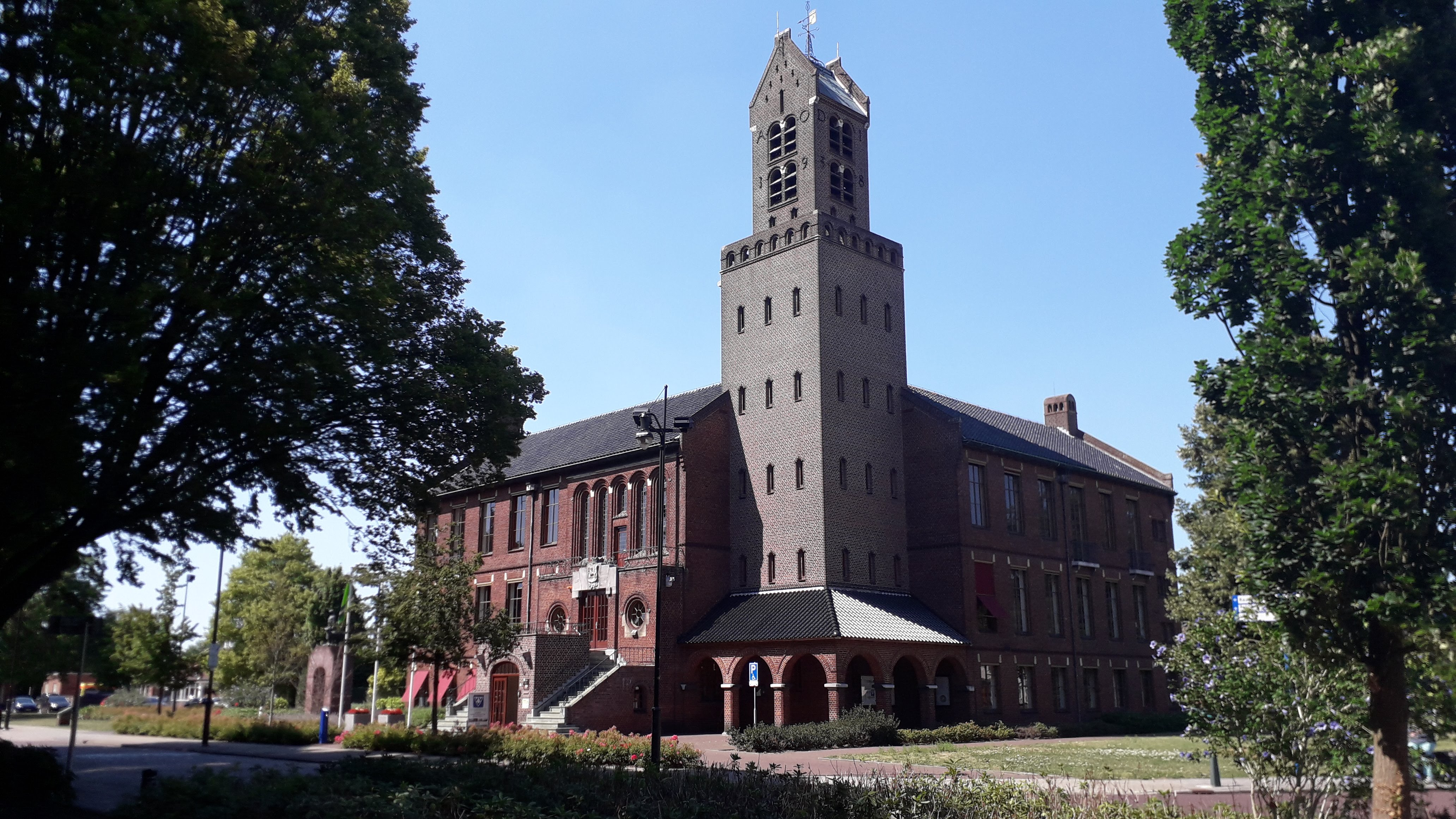
Winterswijk

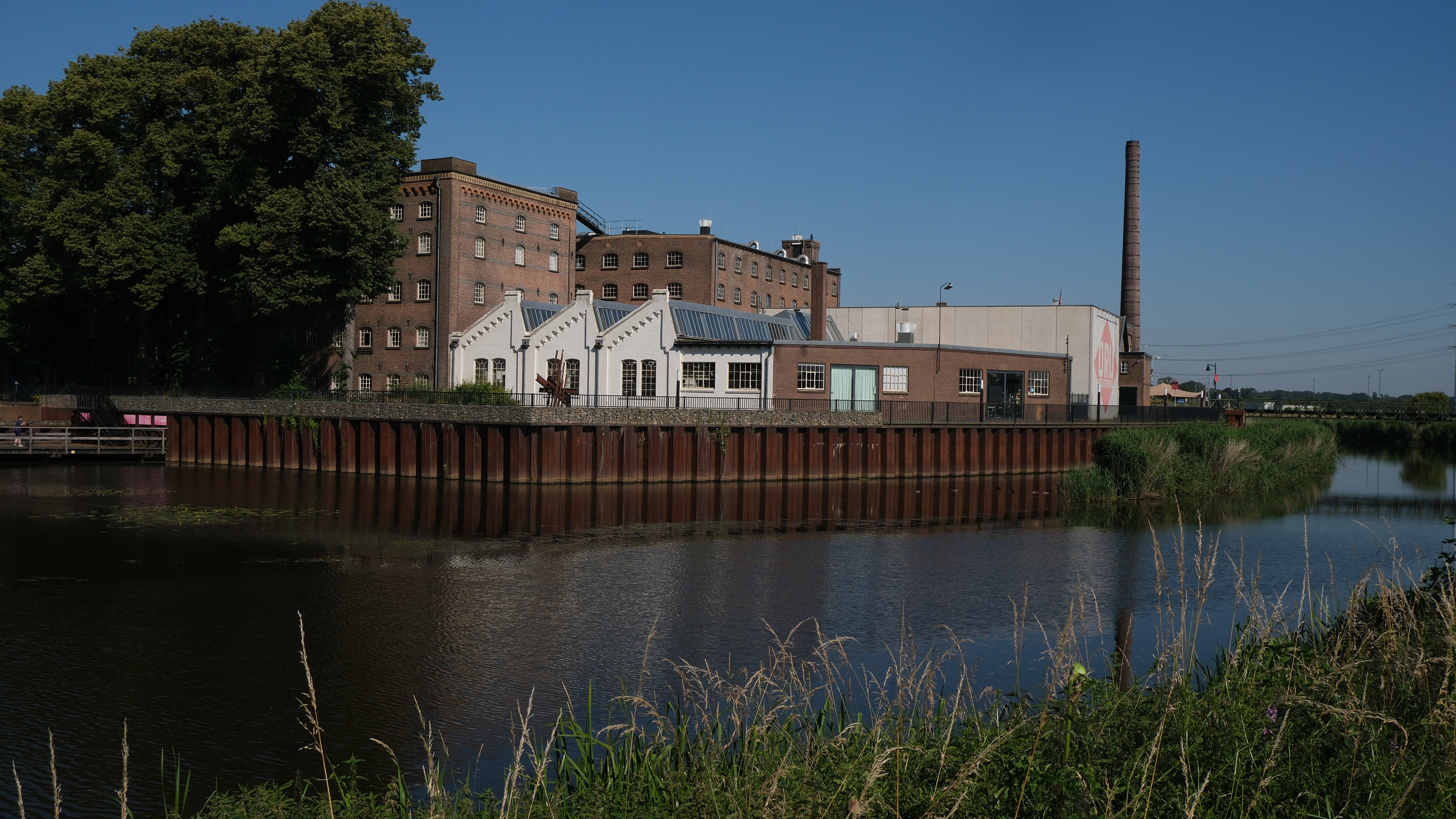
DRU Industriepark, Ulft

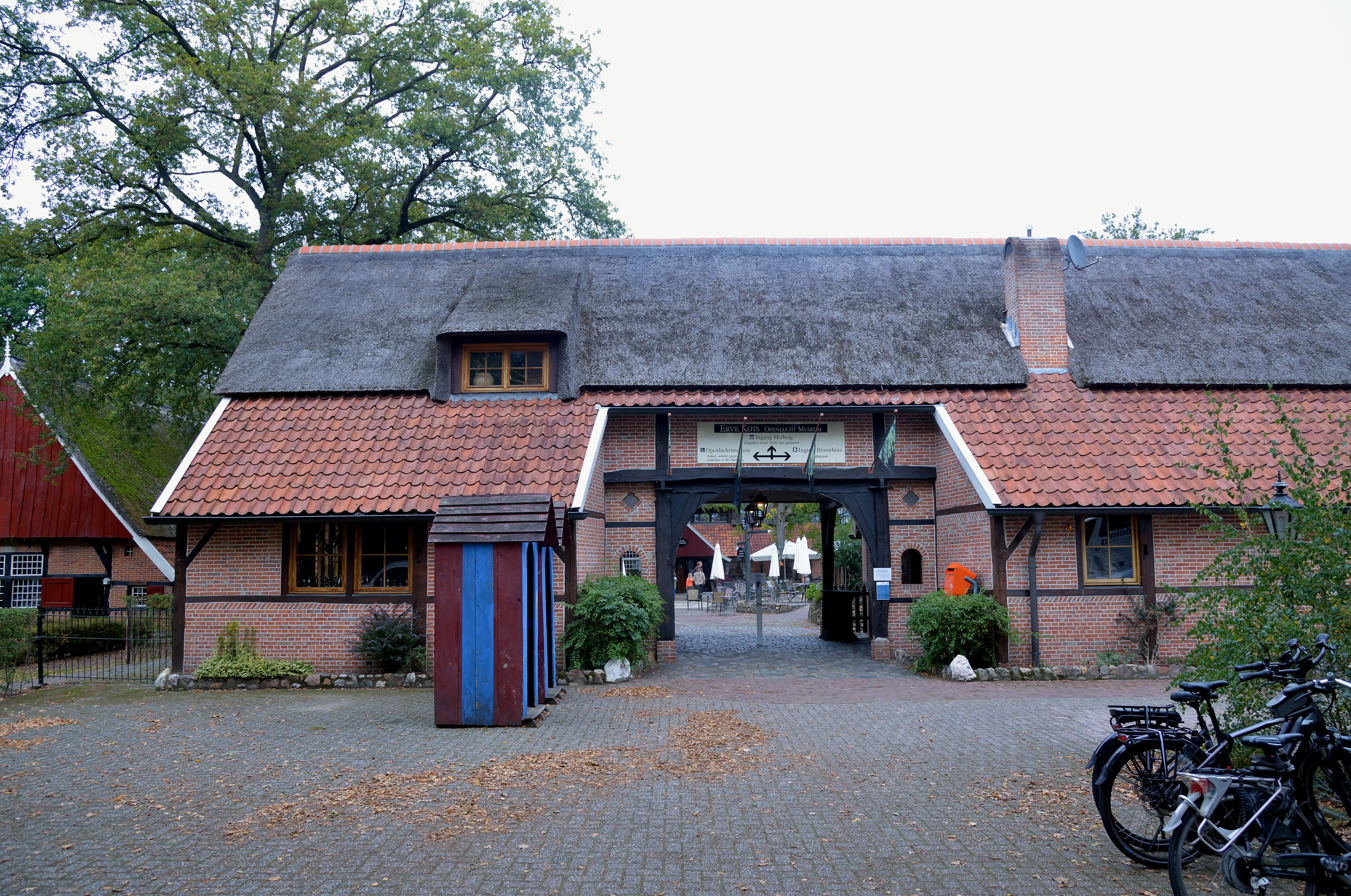
Erve Kots, Lievelde

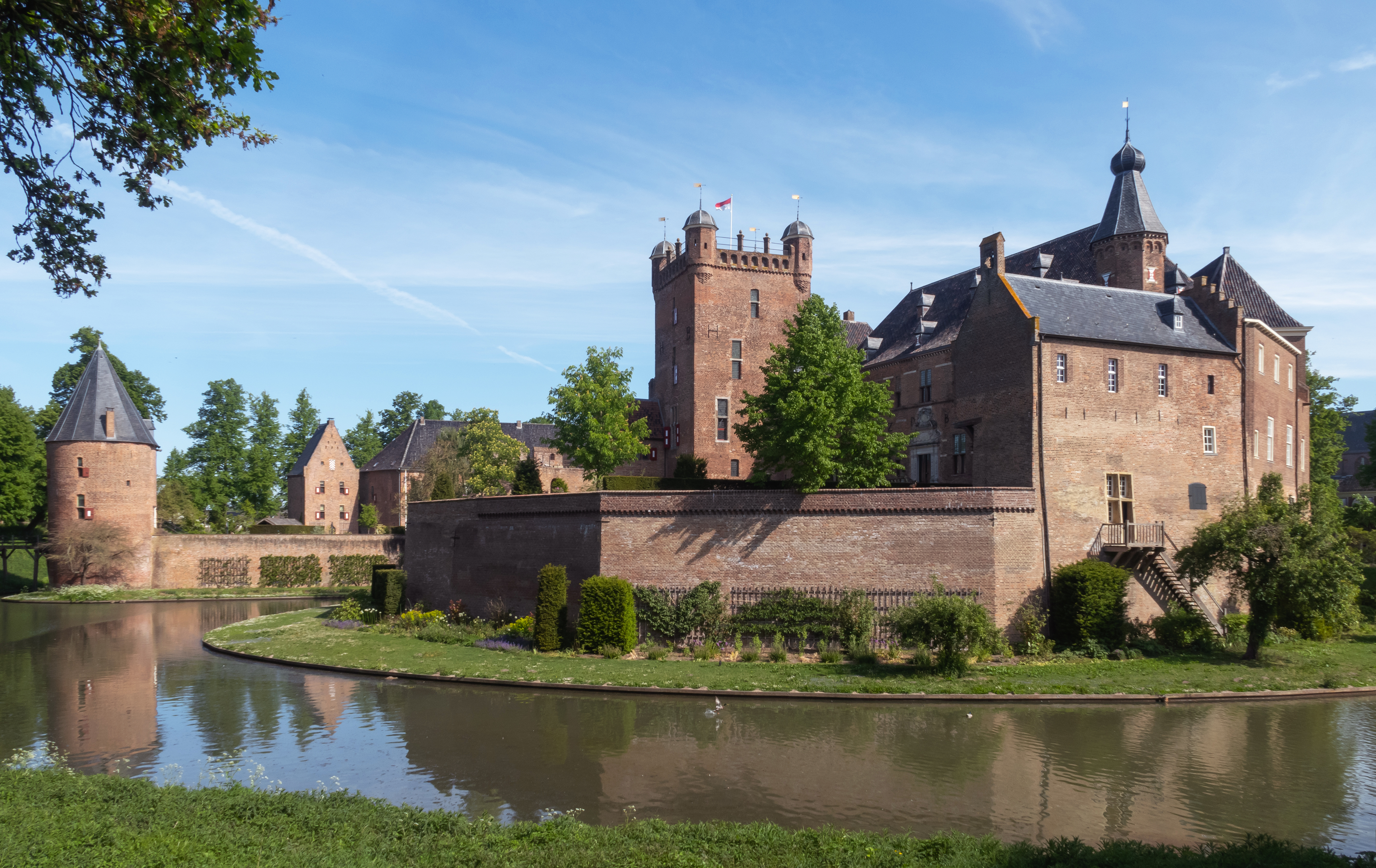
Huis Bergh, 's-Heerenberg
