= Karl, Prince of Hohenzollern-Sigmaringen =

Prince of Hohenzollern-Sigmaringen (1831-1848)

Karl
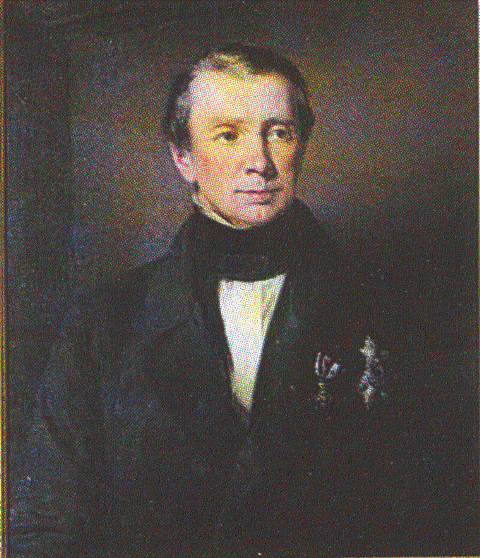

Prince of Hohenzollern-Sigmaringen
- Reign: 17 October 1831 – 27 August 1848
- Predecessor: Anton Aloys
- Successor: Karl Anton
- Born: 20 February 1785; Sigmaringen Castle, Hohenzollern-Sigmaringen
- Died: 11 March 1853 (aged 68); Bologna, Italy
- Spouse: Princess Marie Antoinette Murat (m. 1808; died 1847) Princess Katharina of Hohenlohe-Waldenburg-Schillingsfürst (m. 1848)
- Issue: Princess Karoline; Karl Anton, Prince of Hohenzollern; Princess Amalie; Princess Friederike
- House: Hohenzollern
- Father: Anton Aloys, Prince of Hohenzollern-Sigmaringen
- Mother: Princess Amalie Zephyrine of Salm-Kyrburg
- Religion: Roman Catholic

Karl, Prince of Hohenzollern-Sigmaringen (20 February 1785 – 11 March 1853) was the reigning Prince of Hohenzollern-Sigmaringen from 1831 to 1848.

In 1833, Karl summoned a constitutional assembly (Landtag) and promulgated a constitutional charter as the law in his lands. He founded a hospital for his subjects, and had the Ständehaus built on the modern Leopoldsplatz in Sigmaringen (today owned by the Hohenzollerische Landesbank). Karl also removed the burden of serfdom and various other medieval laws.

During the German revolutions of 1848–1849, Karl abdicated in favor of his son, Karl Anton, on 27 August 1848.

== Marriage ==
His marriage as hereditary prince at the imperial court in Paris on 4 February 1808 to Princess Antoinette Murat, a niece of Napoleon I's brother-in-law, the French Marshal Joachim Murat who was then Grand Duke of Berg, constituted a union between extended family members of the previously warring French imperial and Prussian royal dynasties following Napoleonic victories on the European continent. Following the death of his first wife on 19 January 1847, Karl married Princess Katharina, daughter of Karl III Albrecht, last reigning Prince of Hohenlohe-Waldenburg-Schillingsfürst, and the widow since 1845 of Count Franz Erwin von Ingelheim, on 14 March 1848.

== Death ==
He died on 11 March 1853 in Bologna, while traveling to Rome.

== Children ==
From his first marriage he had the following children:

- Karoline von Hohenzollern-Sigmaringen (1810–1885)

∞ 1. 1839 Count Friedrich Franz Anton von Hohenzollern-Hechingen (1790–1847)
∞ 2. 1850 Johann Stäger von Waldburg (1822–1882)

- Karl Anton (1811–1885), Prince of Hohenzollern, Prussian minister

∞ 1834 Princess Josephine of Baden (1813–1900)

- Amalie of Hohenzollern-Sigmaringen (1815–1841)

∞ 1835 Prince Eduard von Sachsen-Altenburg (1804–1852)

- Friederike von Hohenzollern-Sigmaringen (1820–1906)

∞ 1844 Marchese Gioacchino Napoleone Pepoli (1825–1881)

== Ancestry ==
Ancestors of Karl, Prince of Hohenzollern-Sigmaringen

16. Meinrad II, Prince of Hohenzollern-Sigmaringen
8. Joseph Franz Ernst, Prince of Hohenzollern-Sigmaringen
17. Countess Johanna Catharina of Montfort-Tettnang
4. Karl Friedrich, Prince of Hohenzollern-Sigmaringen
18. Count Franz Albrecht of Oettingen-Spielberg
9. Countess Maria Franziska Luise of Oettingen-Spielberg
19. Johanna von Schwendi
2. Anton Aloys, Prince of Hohenzollern-Sigmaringen
20. Meinrad II, Prince of Hohenzollern-Sigmaringen (= 16)
10. Franz Wilhelm, Count of Hohenzollern-s'Heerenberg
21. Countess Johanna Catharina of Montfort-Tettnang (= 17)
5. Countess Johanna of Hohenzollern-s'Heerenberg
22. Johann Christoph von Waldburg-Zeil
11. Countess Maria Katharina of Waldburg-Zeil
23. Countess Maria Franziska Elisabeth von Montfort
1. Karl, Prince of Hohenzollern-Sigmaringen
24. Karl Florentin of Salm-Neuweiler
12. Count Heinrich Gabriel of Salm-Kyrburg
25. Marie Gabrielle of Lalaing
6. Philip Joseph, Prince of Salm-Kyrburg
26. Philippe François de Croÿ, Marquess of Warnecq
13. Marie Therese of Croÿ, Marchioness of Warnecq
27. Claudine de La Pierre
3. Princess Amalie Zephyrine of Salm-Kyrburg
28. Philippe Emanuel of Hornes
14. Maximilien Emanuel, Prince of Hornes
29. Marie Anne, Princess of Ligne
7. Princess Maria Theresa of Hornes
30. Thomas Bruce, 2nd Earl of Ailesbury
15. Baroness Marie Therese of Melsbroeck
31. Charlotte d'Argenteau, comtesse d'Esneux

Karl, Prince of Hohenzollern-Sigmaringen House of Hohenzollern Born: 20 February 1785 Died: 11 March 1853
Preceded by Anton Aloys	Prince of Hohenzollern-Sigmaringen; 1831–1848	Succeeded by Karl Anton
