= Anton Aloys, Prince of Hohenzollern-Sigmaringen =

Prince of Hohenzollern-Sigmaringen (1785–1831)

Anton Aloys
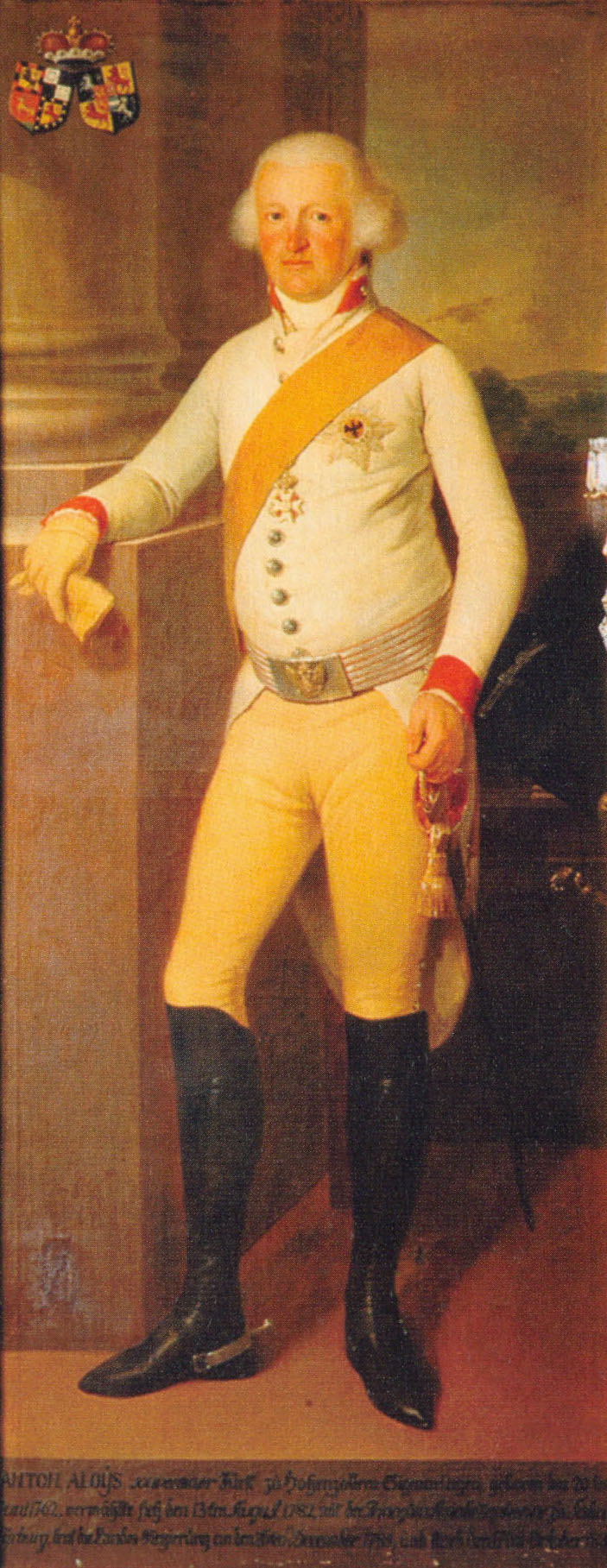

Prince of Hohenzollern-Sigmaringen
- Tenure: 1785–1831
- Predecessor: Karl Friedrich
- Successor: Charles
- Born: 20 June 1762; Sigmaringen
- Died: 17 October 1831 (aged 69); Sigmaringen
- Spouse: Princess Amalie Zephyrine of Salm-Kyrburg (m. 1782)
- Issue: Charles, Prince of Hohenzollern-Sigmaringen
- House: Hohenzollern-Sigmaringen
- Father: Charles Frederick, Prince of Hohenzollern-Sigmaringen
- Mother: Johanna of Hohenzollern-Bergh

Anton Aloys, Prince of Hohenzollern-Sigmaringen (20 June 1762 – 17 October 1831) was Prince of Hohenzollern-Sigmaringen.

Anton Aloys was the son of Prince Karl Friedrich, Prince of Hohenzollern-Sigmaringen (1724–1785) and his wife Johanna (1727–1787), daughter of Count Franz Wilhelm of Hohenzollern-Berg. Anton Aloys was born during the Seven Years' War and grew up mostly in 'Bergh-'s-Heerenberg on his mother's Dutch estate. His father participated in the War, so his mother lived there with her brother. Later he was educated at the universities of Freiburg, Heidelberg and Ingolstadt. He married on 13 August 1782 at Schloss Dhaun, Amalie Zephyrine (1760–1841), the daughter of Philipp Joseph, Prince of Salm-Kyrburg.

In 1785 he succeeded his father, and two years later after his mother's death inherited her rich Dutch estates through the county of Bergh-s'Heerenberg. In 1789 the Brabant Revolution took place in the Austrian Netherlands, which Anton Aloys followed intently due to his possessions there. At the 1790 coronation of Emperor Leopold II of the House of Habsburg-Lotharingia, Anton Aloys held the office of Lord Chamberlain. At the outbreak of the French Revolutionary Wars, Anton Aloys fled to Vienna, and returned again in 1796. France received from Germany the territories on the left Rhine, so Anton Aloys lost all his Dutch estates in 1802. As compensation he received the territory of Glatt in the northern Black Forest, and the old monasteries of Inzigkofen, Beuron and Holzen.

== Issue ==
He married Princess Amalie Zephyrine of Salm-Kyrburg in 1782 and was the father of:

- Charles, Prince of Hohenzollern-Sigmaringen.

He was the paternal great-grandfather of Prince Karl of Hohenzollern-Sigmaringen, who became King Carol I of Romania.

== Ancestry ==
Ancestors of Anton Aloys, Prince of Hohenzollern-Sigmaringen

16. Maximilian I, Prince of Hohenzollern-Sigmaringen
8. Meinrad II, Prince of Hohenzollern-Sigmaringen
17. Countess Maria Clara of Berg-'s-Heerenberg
4. Joseph Franz Ernst, Prince of Hohenzollern-Sigmaringen
18. Count Johann Anton I. of Montfort-Tettnang
9. Countess Johanna Catharina of Montfort-Tettnang
19. Countess Maria Viktorina of Spaur and Flavon
2. Karl Friedrich, Prince of Hohenzollern-Sigmaringen
20. Count Johann Franz of Oettingen-Spielberg
10. Prince Franz Albrecht of Oettingen-Spielberg
21. Ludovike Rosalie of Attems-Tanzenberg
5. Countess Maria Franziska Luise of Oettingen-Spielberg
22. Franz Ignaz of Schwendi
11. Johanna von Schwendi
23. Maria Margarethe Johanna Fugger of Glott
1. Anton Aloys, Prince of Hohenzollern-Sigmaringen
24. Maximilian I, Prince of Hohenzollern-Sigmaringen (= 16)
12. Meinrad II, Prince of Hohenzollern-Sigmaringen (= 8)
25. Countess Maria Clara of Berg-'s-Heerenberg (= 17)
6. Franz Wilhelm, Count of Hohenzollern-s'Heerenberg
26. Count Johann Anton I. of Montfort-Tettnang (= 18)
13. Countess Johanna Catharina of Montfort-Tettnang (= 9)
27. Countess Maria Viktorina of Spaur and Flavon (= 19)
3. Countess Johanna of Hohenzollern-s'Heerenberg
28. Paul Jacob of Waldburg-Zeil
14. Johann Christoph von Waldburg-Zeil
29. Amalia Lucia of Berg-'s-Heerenberg
7. Countess Maria Katharina of Waldburg-Zeil
30. Johann VIII of Montfort-Tettnang
15. Countess Maria Franziska Elisabeth von Montfort
31. Maria Catharina of Sulz

Anton Aloys, Prince of Hohenzollern-Sigmaringen House of Hohenzollern Born: 20 June 1762 Died: 17 October 1831
Preceded by Karl Friedrich	Prince of Hohenzollern-Sigmaringen; 1785–1831	Succeeded by Charles
