= Sigmaringen Castle =

Castle in Sigmaringen, Baden-Württemberg, Germany

Coordinates: 48°05′16″N 9°13′01″E

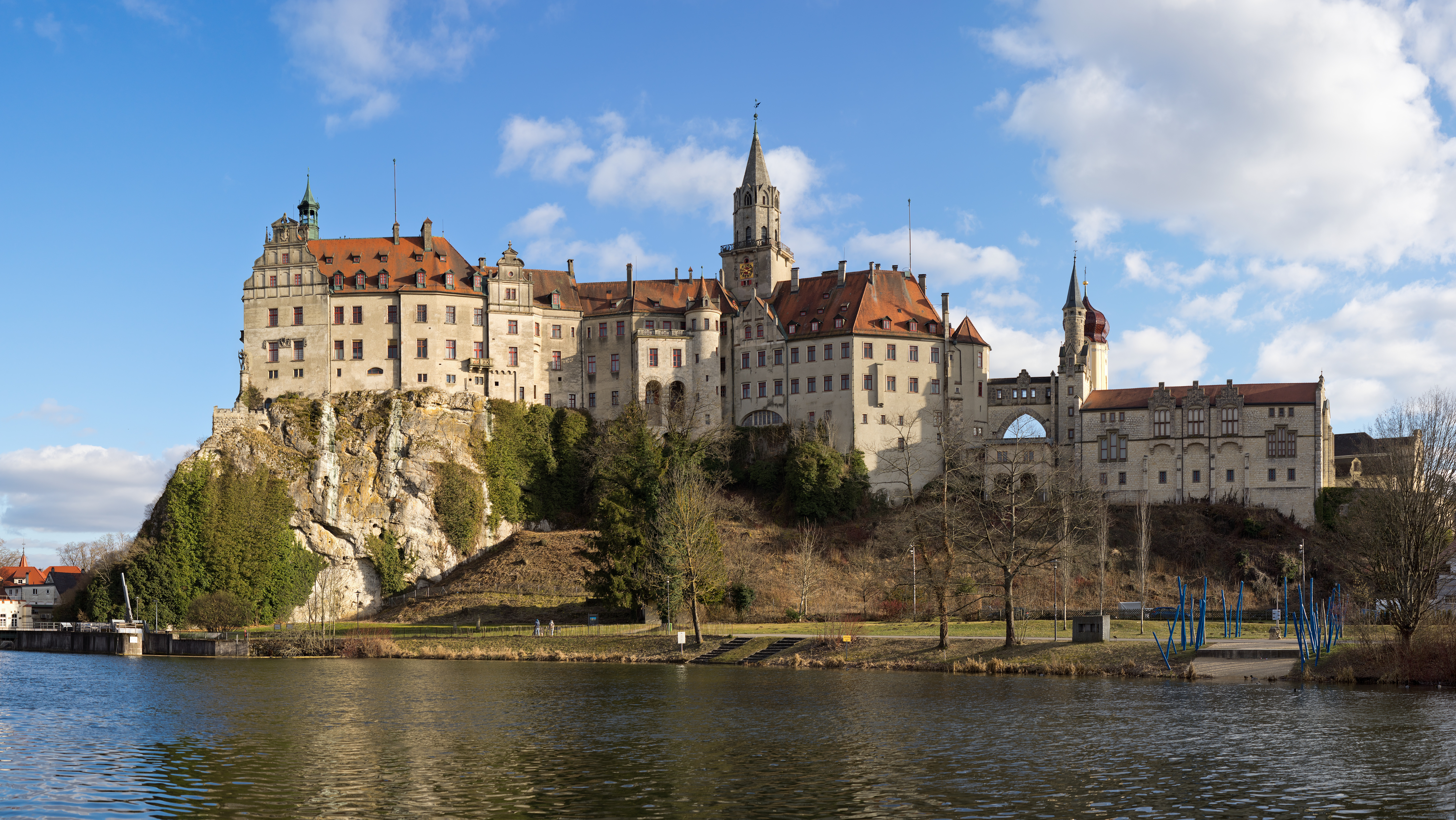
Schloss Sigmaringen from the north west

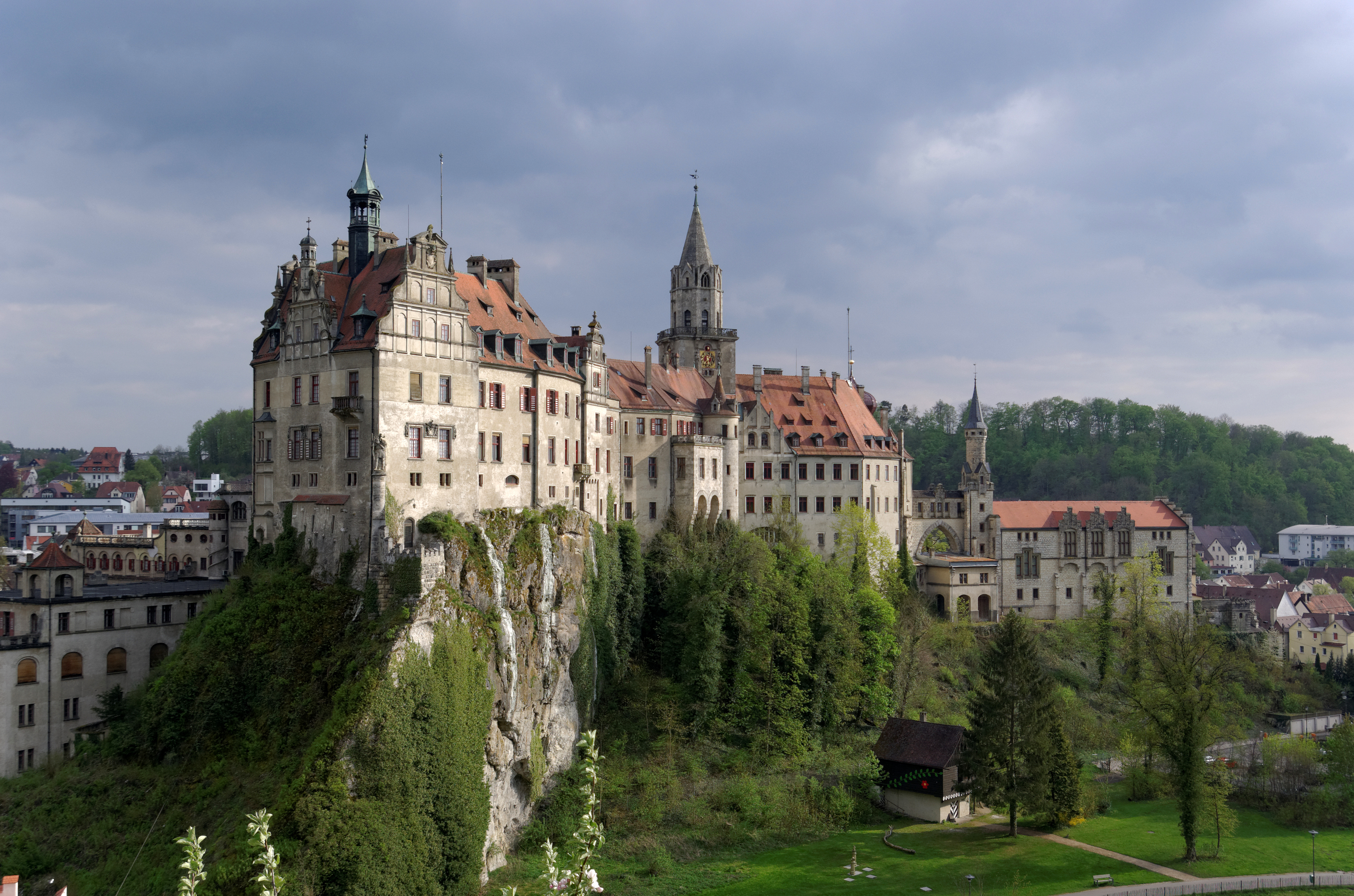
Schloss Sigmaringen from the north east

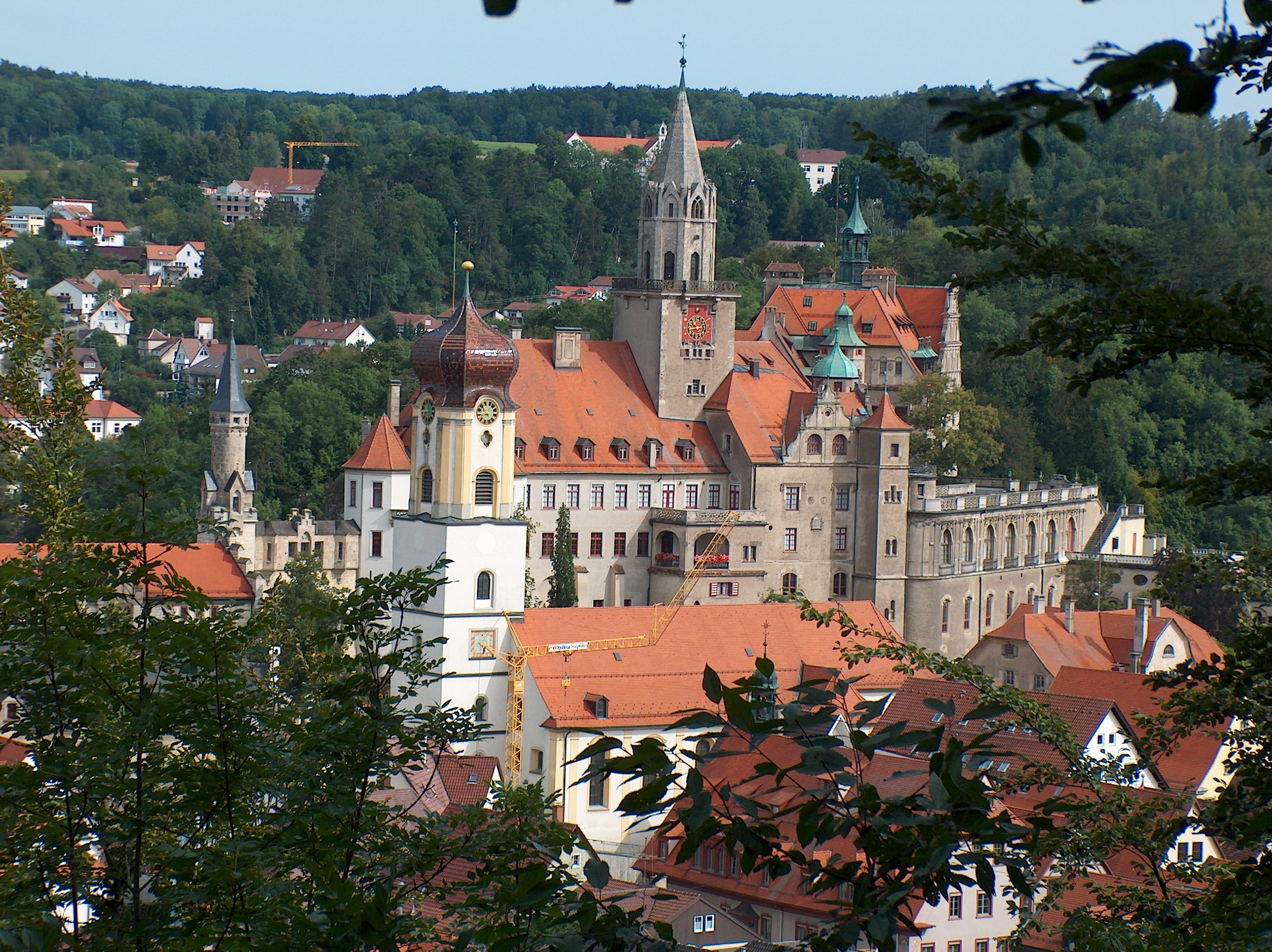
View from the south

Sigmaringen Castle (German: Schloss Sigmaringen) was the princely castle and seat of government for the Princes of Hohenzollern-Sigmaringen. Situated in the Swabian Alb region of Baden-Württemberg, Germany, this castle dominates the skyline of the town of Sigmaringen. The castle was rebuilt following a fire in 1893, and only the towers of the earlier medieval fortress remain. Schloss Sigmaringen was a family estate of the Swabian Hohenzollern family, a cadet branch of the Hohenzollern family, from which the German Emperors and kings of Prussia came. During the closing months of World War II, Schloss Sigmaringen was briefly the seat of the Vichy French Government after France was liberated by the Allies. The castle and museums may be visited throughout the year, but only on guided tours. It is still owned by the Hohenzollern-Sigmaringen family, although they no longer reside there.

== Location ==
Sigmaringen is located on the southern edge of the Swabian Jura, a plateau region in southern Baden-Württemberg. The Hohenzollern castle was built below the narrow Danube river valley in the modern Upper Danube Nature Park (German: Naturpark Obere Donau). The castle rises above the Danube on a towering chalk projection that is a spur of the white Jura Mountains formation. The hill is known simply as the Schlossberg or Castle Rock. The Schlossberg is about 200 meters (660 ft) long and up to 35 meters (115 ft) above the river. On this free-standing towering rock, the princely Hohenzollern castle is the largest of the Danube valley castles. The sheer cliffs and steep sides of the tower made it a natural site for a well-protected medieval castle.

== History ==
=== Construction of the first castle ===
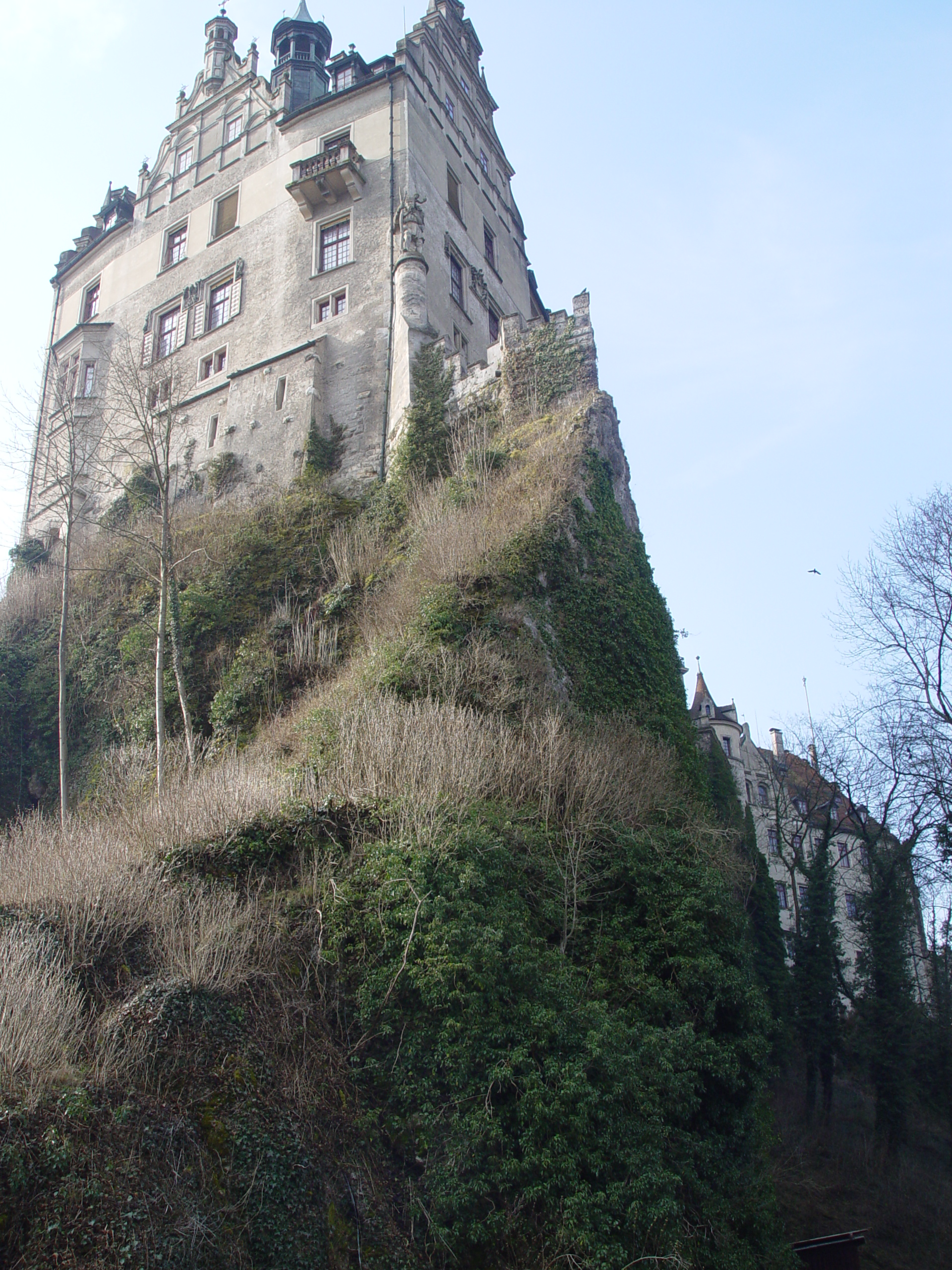
The castle lies on the Danube, atop a 35-metre (115 ft) chalk cliff known as the Schlossberg

The first castle at Sigmaringen appeared during the end of the Early Middle Ages, during the early 11th century. The castle was first mentioned in 1077 following the unsuccessful siege of Burg Sigmaringen by Rudolf of Rheinfelden in his fight against the King of Germany, Henry IV. In 1083 a pair of brothers, Ludwig and Manegold von Sigmaringen, are listed as witnesses on a document for the Königseggwald abbey.

Ludwig von Sigmaringen was married to Richinza von Spitzenberg, daughter of Berthold I. von Zähringen. At the end of the 11th century he built a castle on the Spitzenberg at Kuchen, Germany. The castle and the surrounding land and villages were part of the inheritance of Richinza. From their marriage Richinza and Ludwig had four children; Mathilde von Spitzenberg, the wife of Aribo von Wertingen, the clergyman Ulrich von Sigmaringen, Ludwig II von Sigmaringen-Spitzenberg and Manegold von Sigmaringen-Spitzenberg. The three brothers, Ulrich, Ludwig and Mangold von Sigmaringen are named as the founders of the 11th-century St. George's Abbey in the Black Forest.

From 1133 until 1170 Rudolf von Sigmaringen-Spitzenberg, the son of Ludwig II, ruled at Sigmaringen. In 1183 Graf Ludwig von Sigmaringen-Spitzenberg-Helfenstein, the son of Rudolf, is mentioned at the castle. In 1147 Ludwig as well as his father Rudolf and brother Ulrich II von Sigmaringen-Spitzenberg are mentioned in a document of Walter von Dillingen, Prince-Bishop of Augsburg, as lords of Spitzenberg-Sigmaringen.

=== Under the Helfenstein family, until 1290 ===
Under the Helfenstein family, the castle was renovated around 1200. The castle was totally rebuilt with buckel stones (squared-off stones with a rounded outer surface). Between 1209 and 1258 the castle was occupied by Graf Gottried von Sigmaringen-Helfenstein and his son Graf Gebhard von Sigmaringen-Pietengau. In 1258 the cousin of Graf Gebhard, Graf Ulrich II. von Helfenstein, became the owner of Burg Sigmaringen. Later, Ulrich's daughter Agnes married Graf Ulrich I. von Montfort. Following the marriage in 1272, Sigmaringen was owned by the Counts of Montfort. Then, in 1290 Graf Hugo V. von Montfort, son of Ulrich I, sold the castle and the city of Sigmaringen to Albrecht and Rudolf von Habsburg.

By 1325 Duke Luipold von Habsburg had sold the castle and the county of Sigmaringen to the Count of Württemberg.

=== Werdenberg family 1399–1534 ===
Finally in 1399 Count Eberhard von Württemberg granted the castle and county of Sigmaringensein as well as the county of Veringen in Margraviate of Austria, to his uncle and liegeman Count Eberhard III. von Werdenberg (1387–1416) as a fief. His son Count Johann IV. von Werdenberg (1416–1465) and his wife Countess von Württemberg (disinherited by the House of Württemberg), in 1459 inherited the castle and county of Sigmaringen. To protect his land, in the following year he declared Sigmaringen an Austrian fief. From 1460 until 1500 the Counts von Werdenberg renovated the Burg (a military fortress) into Schloss Sigmaringen (a fortified residence), and expanded it to the dimensions which remain today. Toward the end of the 15th century they built two long, angular buildings in the north east. Then, in the early 16th century another wing was added to the west. The two round towers that flank the entrance to the castle also date from this time

Hugo IX. zu Sigmaringen (1459–1508), son of Johann IV., died without any male offspring. His sister Anna von Werdenberg married Count Friedrich von Fürstenberg in 1516.

In 1521 Christoph (1494–1534), together with his brothers Johann VI. and Felix I. von Werdenberg, was granted the fief of Sigmaringen from Emperor Charles V. Count Christoph married, after his first marriage to Eleonore Gonzaga remained childless, Johanna von Bröseln, widow of the Count Eitel Friedrich III. von Hohenzollern in 1526. All of his children died, except for his daughter Anna, who married Friedrichs II. von Fürstenberg.

According to the Zimmern Chronicle in 1530, as Count Felix I was in the bath house with Leonora Werdenberg (the illegitimate daughter of Hugo IX and the mistress of Felix and Christoph von Werdenberg) a fire broke out. The bath house fire was allowed to spread, leading to a fire which raged throughout the outbuildings around the castle.

In 1534, following the death of the last male member of the Werdenberger family, Count Friedrich von Fürstenberg demanded the Werdenberger lands. However, King Ferdinand I granted the fief of Sigmaringen and Veringen, in 1535, to Charles I of Hohenzollern (1516–1576), the son from Johanna von Bröseln's first marriage with Friedrich III. von Hohenzollern.

=== The Hohenzollern and Hohenzollern-Sigmaringen families, 1535–1850 ===
Charles I was the first Hohenzollern to rule in Sigmaringen.

In 1539 there was another fire that damaged the castle.

A year later, in 1540, Sigmaringen and Veringen were transferred to the House of Hohenzollern as part of the Pfullendorf agreement (German: Pfullendorfer Vertrag). Count Charles I. von Hohenzollern occupied the castle.

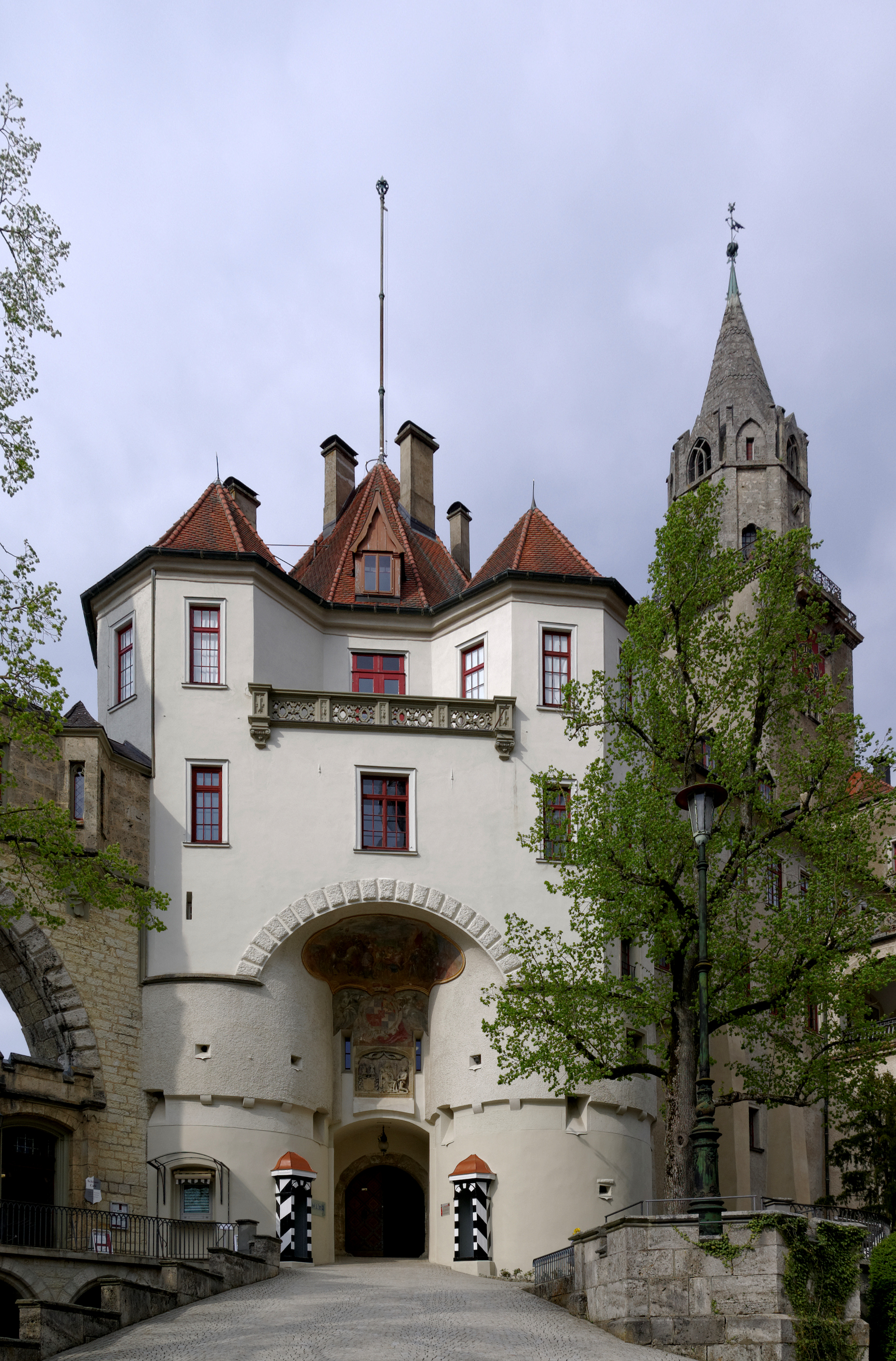
The main gateway

Charles II. von Hohenzollern-Sigmaringen (1547–1606), son of Charles I was the count of Sigmaringen from 1576 until 1606. He was also the founder of the Hohenzollern-Sigmaringen line of the Hohenzollern family. Under Charles II the castle was renovated. Between 1576 and 1606 the gatehouse was expanded to cover the entrance to the castle and a new church was built near the castle.

In 1576 the House of Hohenzollern split into four lines, Hohenzollern (died out in 1602), Hohenzollern-Haigerloch (absorbed by Hohenzollern-Sigmaringen after 1630), Hohenzollern-Hechingen (died out in 1869) and Hohenzollern-Sigmaringen. Sigmaringen was the main residence of the Hohenzollern-Sigmaringen family from 1576 until 1850.

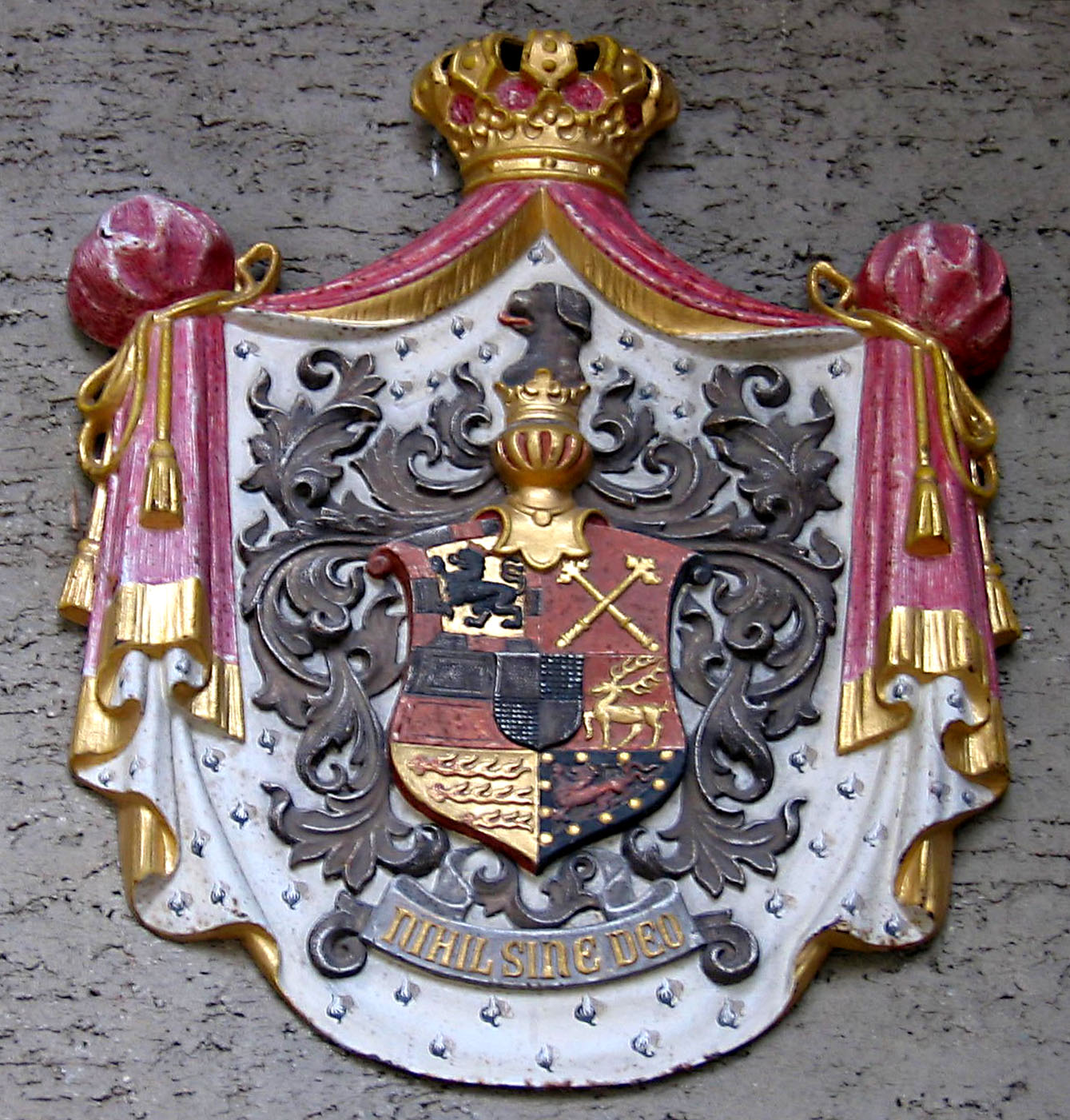
Combined Coat of Arms of the House of Hohenzollern-Sigmaringen

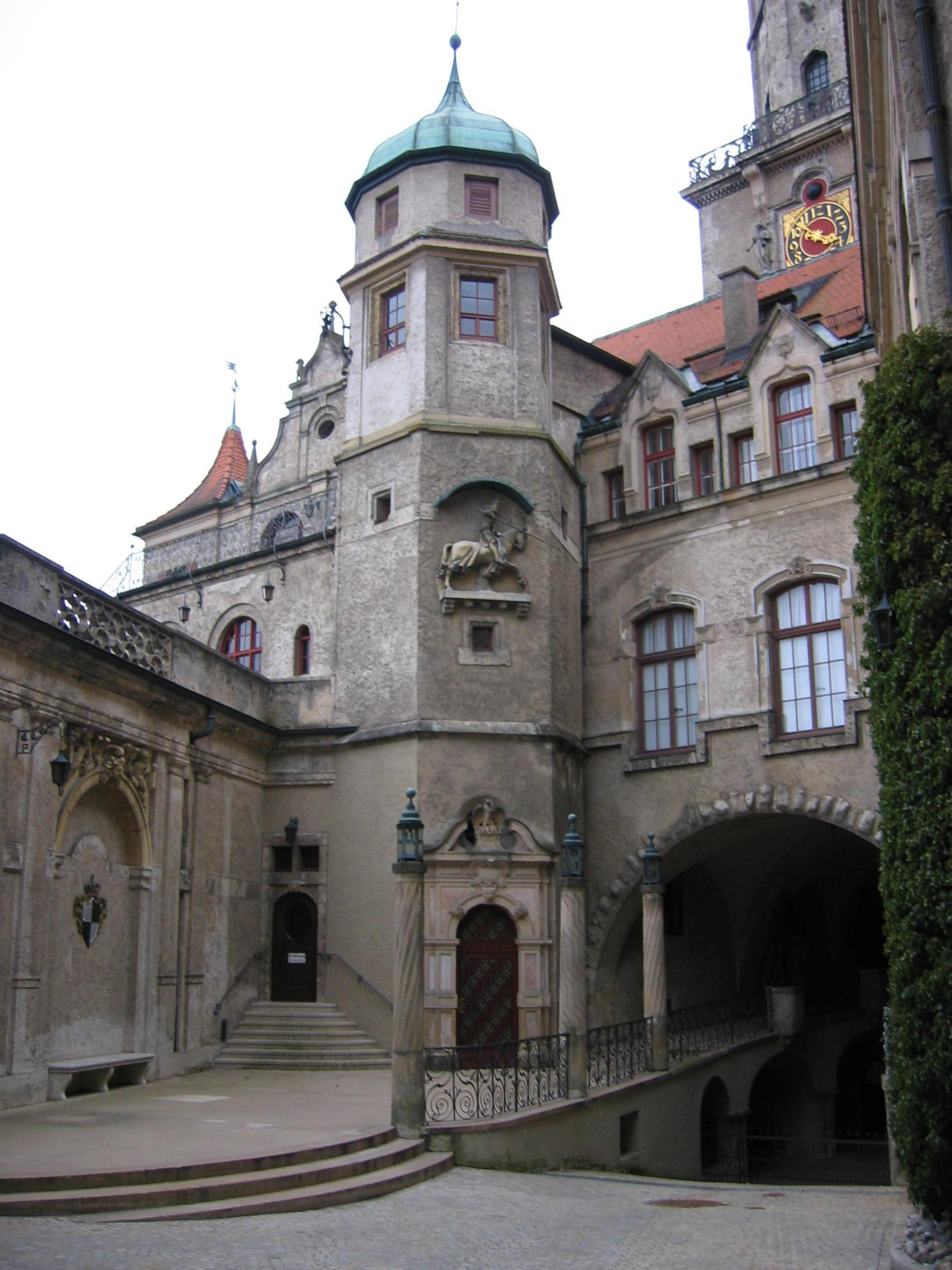
Inner courtyard of the castle

Johann von Hohenzollern-Sigmaringen (1578–1638), the son of Charles II was the count of Hohenzollern-Sigmaringen from 1606 until 1623. Then in 1623 the family was promoted from Count (German: Graf) to the rank of Princes of the Holy Roman Empire (German: Reichsfürst). Johann then became the first prince (German: Fürst) of Hohenzollern-Sigmaringen.

During the Thirty Years' War, the castle was besieged by Swedish troops in 1632, and retaken by the Imperial troops in the following year. During the attack by Imperial troops under General Horn, the eastern section of the castle was destroyed by fire.

Before the siege, Johann fled to Bavaria. He would remain in Bavaria until death, at age 60, in 1638.

Johann's son, Meinrad I (1605–1681), was the prince from 1638 until 1681. Meinrad had the burned eastern wing rebuilt during 1658 and 1659 by the master builder Michael Beer. Both eastern buildings, built when the Werdenberg family owned Sigmaringen, were combined under a single roof.

Maximilian (1636–1689), son of Meinrad I, was prince of Hohenzollern-Sigmaringen from 1681 until 1689.

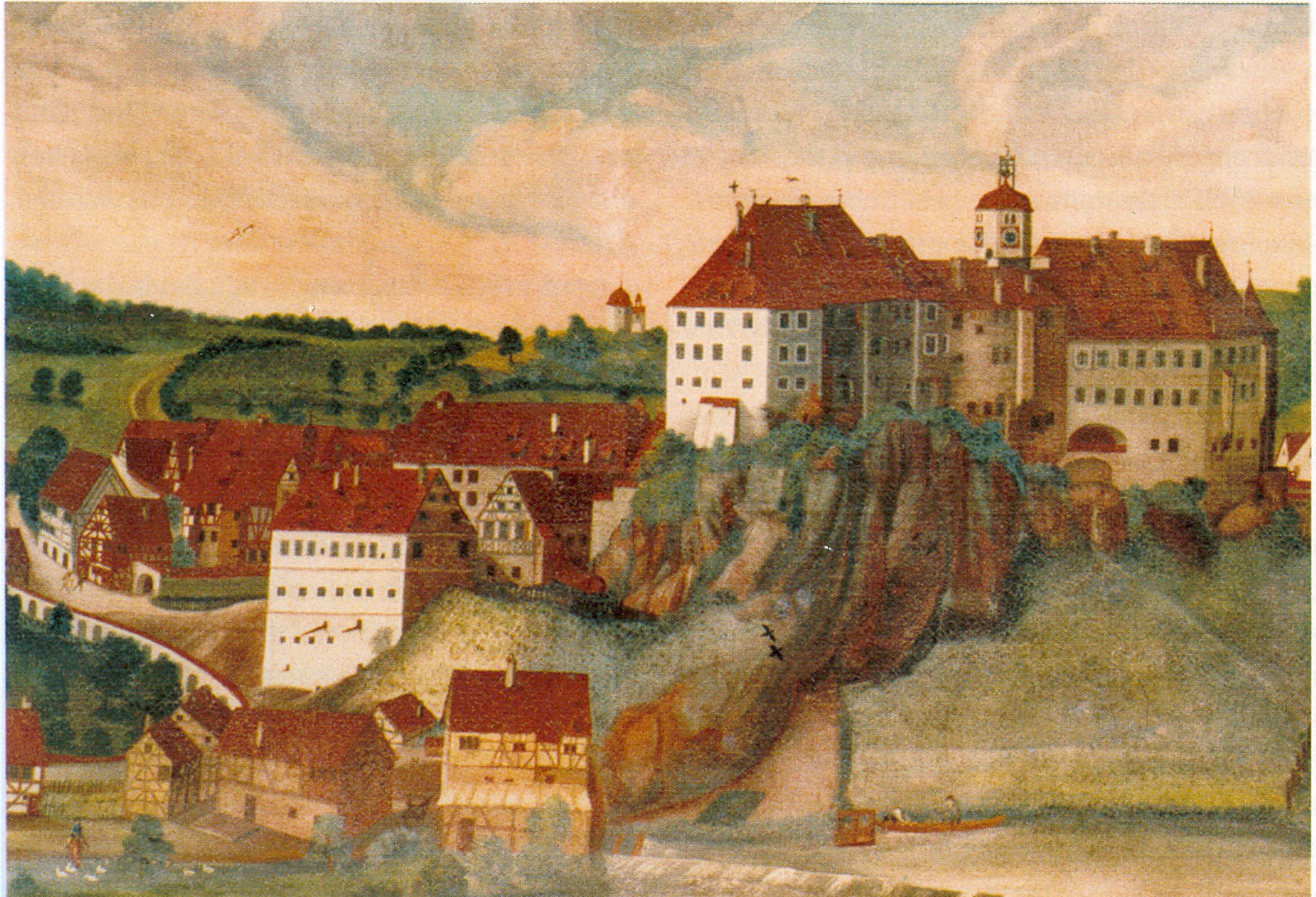
Castle Sigmaringen with the city and mill. The roof on the central tower was replaced with a pointed spire in 1877.

His son Meinrad II (1673–1715) ruled from 1689 until 1715. From 1698 on he ruled in Haigerloch. His son, Josef (1702–1769) ruled from 1715 until 1769. In 1724 Josef ordered the construction of the Marstalles or royal stables. In addition to this construction, in 1736 he had the castle modernized and the Knights' Hall (German: Rittersaal) was built. In 1867 it was refurnished and renamed the Ancestors' Hall (German: Ahnensaal). His son, Karl Friedrich reigned from 1769 until 1785.

Karl Friedrich's son, Anton Aloys (1762–1831), reigned from 1785 until 1831. Between 1815 and 1817 he had the granary rebuilt as a five-story knights' building, which became known as Wilhelm's building (German: Wilhelmsbau).

Prince Karl (1785–1853), the son of Anton Aloys, ruled from 1831 until 1848. In 1833 Karl called a constitutional assembly (German: Landtag) together and created a constitutional charter that would be the law in his lands. He founded a hospital for his subjects, and had the Ständehaus built on the modern Leopoldsplatz in Sigmaringen (today owned by the Hohenzollerischen Landesbank). Karl also removed the burden of serfdom and various other medieval laws. During the German Revolution of 1848 Karl abdicated in favor of his son, Karl Anton, on 27 August 1848. In recognition of Karl's efforts to improve the lives of his subjects, in 1857 the hospital that he built was renamed the Fürst-Carl-Landesspital (Prince Carl Regional Hospital). In 1869 Karl Anton, following the death of Konstantin the last prince of Hohenzollern-Hechingen, annexed the lands of Hohenzollern-Hechingen and became the prince of Hohenzollern.

=== A destination for the rich and powerful ===
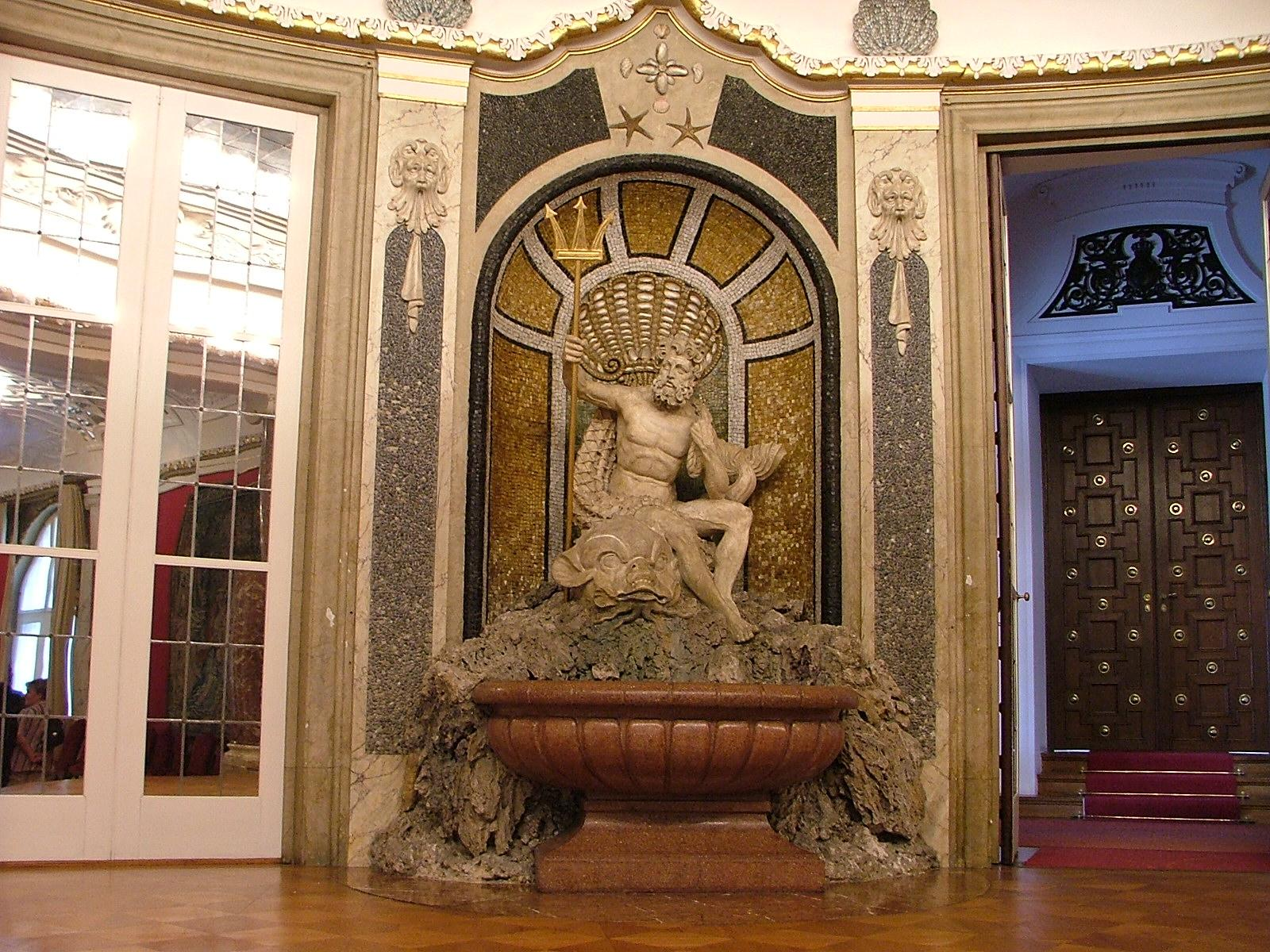
Fountain from the Portuguese Gallery

Karl Anton built the castle into a meeting point for the nobility of Europe. Portions of the castle were rebuilt and decorated to make Schloss Sigmaringen into a destination of the rich and powerful. In 1855, the walls of the upper story were removed to create the Old German Hall (German: Altdeutschen Saal). In 1864 he modified the arches above the southern curtain wall to form the Weapons Room (German: Waffenhalle). From 1862 until 1867 he built the new Art Gallery (German: Kunsthalle), which is today a museum. As a member of the German high nobility, Karl Anton needed a centerpiece of his elegant castle. To create this, in 1872 he had the Parisian architect Lambert rebuild the dining hall into the French Hall (German: Französische Saal). In 1877 he expanded the central keep, removed the old roof and topped the keep with a new pointed roof. In the following year, the Ancestors' Hall (German: Ahnensaal) was rebuilt.

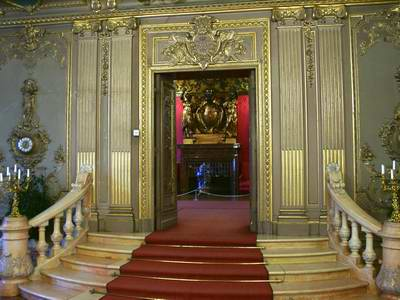
The French Hall (German: Der Französische Saal), used as a dining room

Since 1871 the castle has been open for guided tours. These tours provide a history of the castle as well as the House of Hohenzollern.

Leopold (1835–1905), the son of Karl Anton, was offered the Spanish crown after the Spanish Revolution of 1868 overthrew Queen Isabella II. He was supported by the Prussian Prime Minister Otto von Bismarck, but opposed by the French emperor Napoleon III. Leopold was forced to decline the offer, but the extra demands made by the French government and the sending of the Ems Telegram resulted in the Franco-Prussian War of 1870–71, which led to the fall of Napoleon III and the French Third Republic. Following the war and the death of Karl Anton, Leopold ruled as prince of the Houses of Hohenzollern-Sigmaringen and Hohenzollern from 1885 until his death in 1905.

In 1893, the eastern wing burned and was nearly totally destroyed. Starting in 1895, the construction manager Johannes de Pay and the Munich architect Emanuel von Seidl rebuilt the destroyed section. In 1899 and 1906, other sections of the castle were redone in the eclectic style (a combination of Romanesque, Gothic, and mostly Renaissance styles) that was common at the time. The Portuguese Gallery (German: Portugiesische Galerie) was built during this reconstruction. The construction continued under Leopold's son, Wilhelm (1864–1927) who was prince of the Houses of Hohenzollern-Sigmaringen and Hohenzollern from 1905 until 1927.

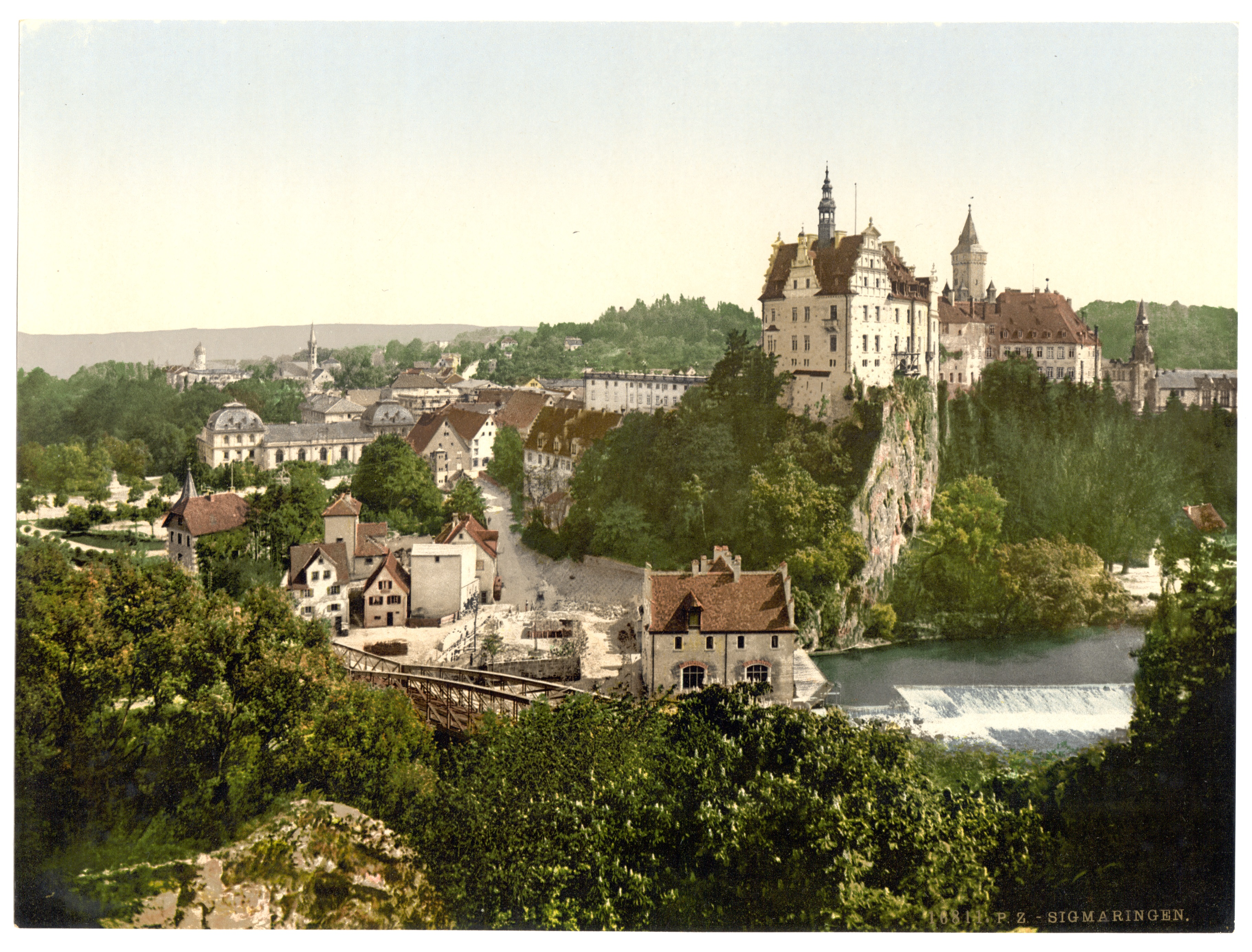
Photochrom print (color photo lithograph) of Schloss Sigmaringen from 1890 to 1905

In 1901, the pointed spire on the keep was destroyed. It was replaced with an octagonal pointed neo-gothic tower made from tuff stone.

Leopold's son Friedrich (1891–1965) was the prince of the house from 1927 until 1965. He opened the carriage house in the lower story of the museum as an early history museum.

=== Seat of the Vichy Government ===
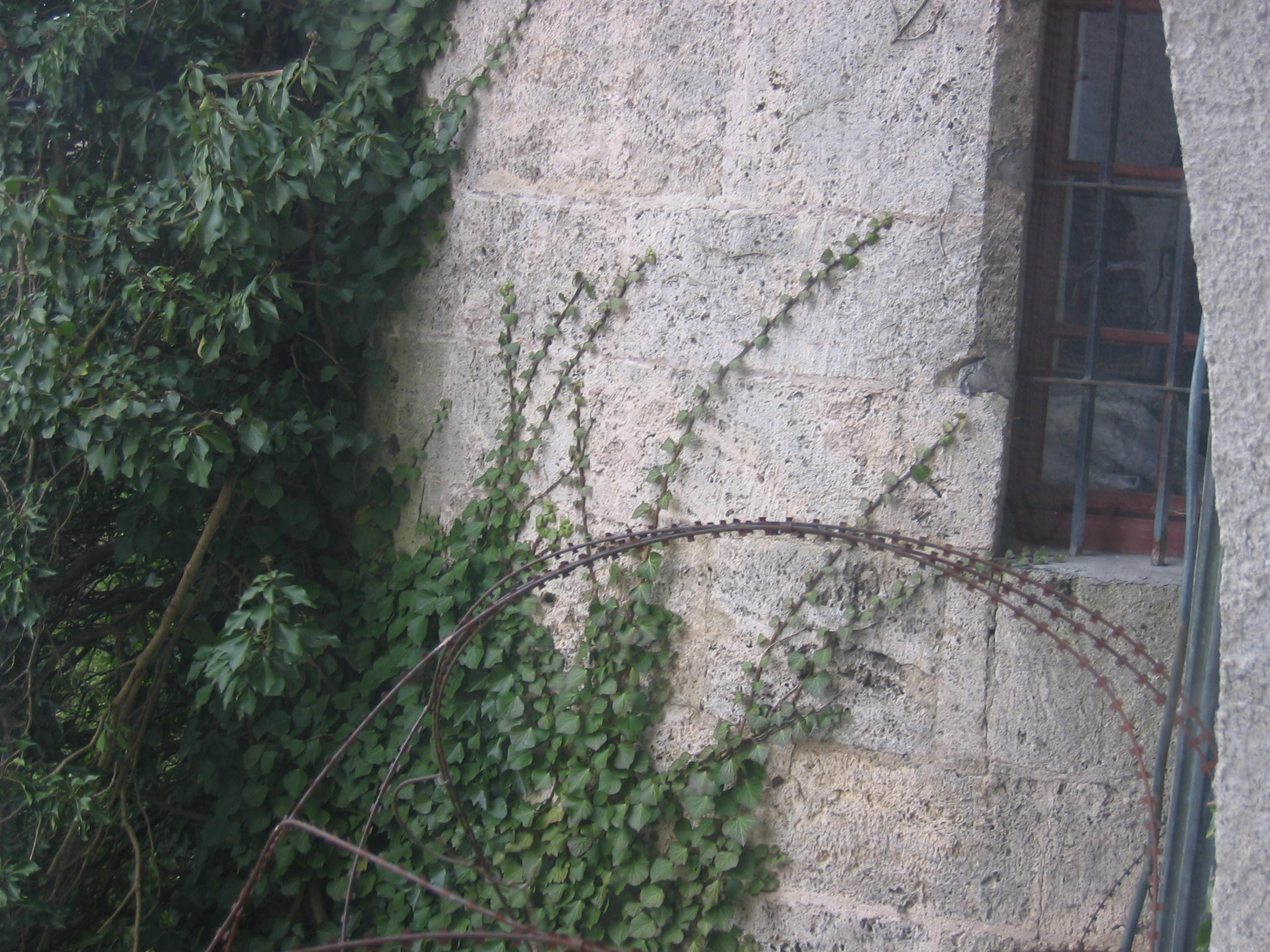
Barbed wire, a witness of the time the Vichy Government-in-Exile occupied Schloss Sigmaringen

Following the Western Allied invasion of France (D-Day and Provence landing), the Nazi regime moved French Vichy Regime from France into Schloss Sigmaringen, in spite of strong protest of Marshal Pétain. The princely family was forced by the Gestapo out of the castle and moved to Schloss Wilflingen. Pierre Laval, former Prime Minister of the Vichy Government, was there as well as Joseph Darnand, Head of the feared Milice. The French authors Louis-Ferdinand Céline and Lucien Rebatet, who had written political and anti-semitic works, feared for their safety and fled to Sigmaringen with the Vichy government. Céline's 1957 novel D'un château l'autre, (English: From one castle to another) describes the end of the war and the fall of Sigmaringen on 22 April 1945. The book was made into a German movie in 2006, through the German media companies ZDF and Arte, called Die Finsternis (English: The Darkness). Pétain was then brought to Switzerland. Shocked by the accusations of collaboration with the Nazis claimed by the French authorities and media, he voluntarily returned to France to face trial, was condemned to death, sentence which was commuted by de Gaulle into life imprisonment. He was in the prison of Île d'Yeu, an island off the Atlantic Coast of France, until he died in 1951.

=== Today ===
During the 1970s, following a crisis in the steel industry, Prince Frederick William had to sell some of the family property to support the Hüttenwerke Laucherthal (English: Laucherthal Steel Works). Since the death of his wife Margarita in 1996, Prince Frederick William lived on a country estate in Jagdschloss Josefslust between Krauchenwies and Sigmaringen. His son and heir, Karl Friedrich, lives in the Sommerschloss (Summer Palace) in Krauchenwies. The castle is occupied by the management for the business interests of the prince as well as the museum.

== Castle site ==
The modern Schloss Sigmaringen owes its current size and appearance to three construction periods.

- The medieval castle from the 11th to 13th centuries, built under the Counts of Sigmaringen-Spitzenberg and Spitzenberg-Helfenstein.
- The renovations and expansion of the castle under Counts of Werdenberg.
- The renovations to make the castle into a princely residence for the Princes of Hohenzollern-Sigmaringen

=== Fortress and protective walls ===
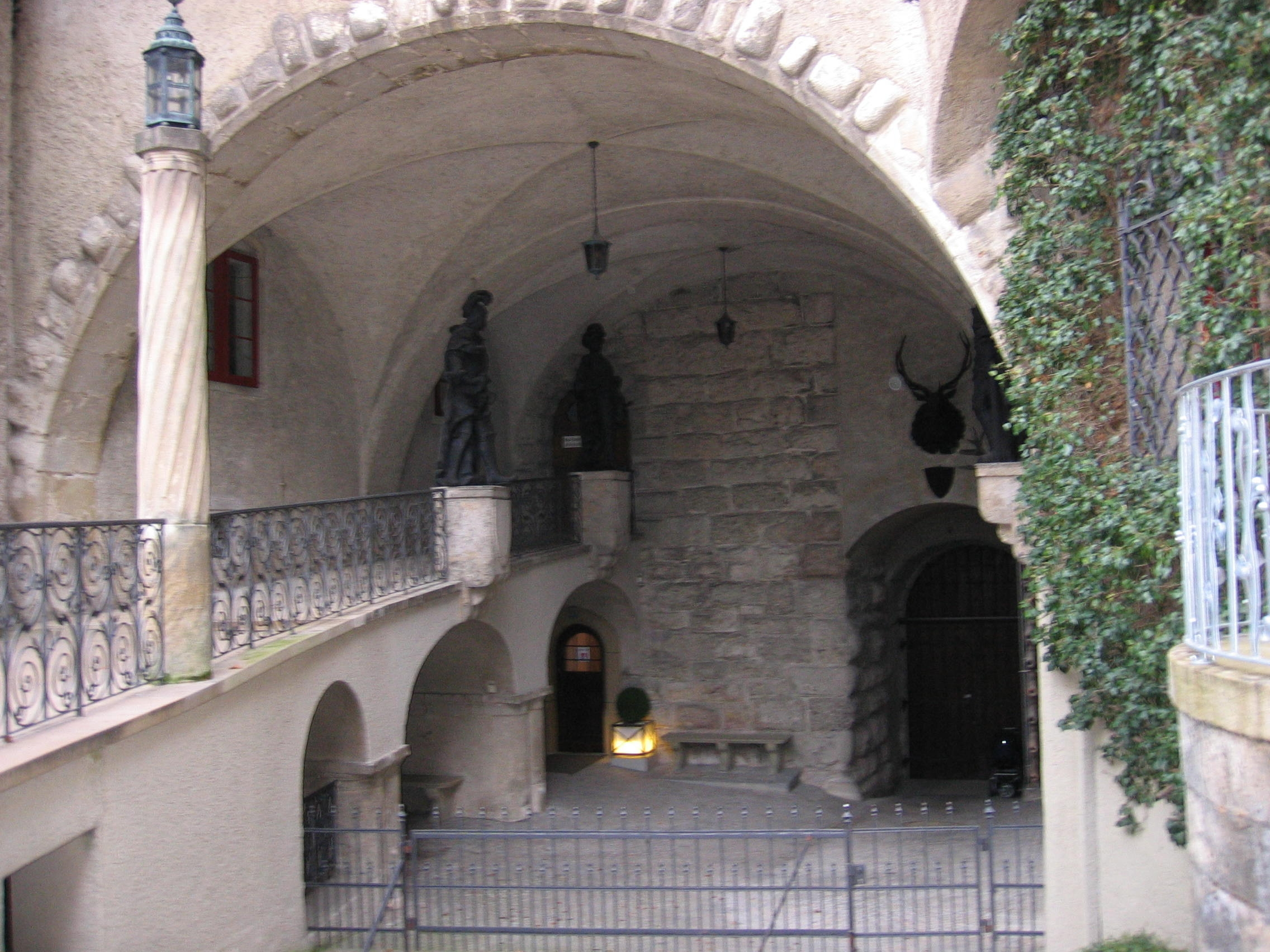
Inner courtyard of the castle, the Buckel Stones from the first castle are visible on the far wall

The first castle at Sigmaringen dated from around 1200 and was built from Buckel Stones (squared off stones with a rounded outer surface). The original castle was fully absorbed into the later constructions. Built on the eastern side of the rock hill, it was one of the best protected castles in Germany during the Middle Ages. The original castle was 80 by 30 meters (262 by 98 ft) with the central keep being 45 by 20 meters (148 by 66 ft) in size. The flat and therefore threatened west side was protected by a moat and a 25 or 26 meters (82 or 85 ft) high keep. The square western keep was 8.23 by 8.34 meters (27.0 by 27.4 ft) in size.

The foundations of the castle were between 3 and 2.5 meters (9.8 and 8.2 ft) thick. The, originally, four-story keep walls taper slightly to between 2 or 2.5 meters (6.6 or 8.2 ft) thick. The walls are built in the buckel stone style out of a mixture of limestone and Nagelfluh, a conglomerate rock found in the area. The keep could be entered through a nearly 8 metres (26 ft) high entrance on the courtyard side. To the north of the keep, next to the wall tower, is the castle gate with a gatehouse. The 2.28 meters (7.5 ft) wide and 3.96 meters (13.0 ft) high castle gate was built as a semi-circular entrance with rounded stones and soldiers carved as capitals on the columns. Currently, the castle gate is located at the upper end of the steeply inclined entry hall. The flat top of the hill was surrounded by a curtain wall. From the original fortified house with its blind arches and enclosed kitchen, located on the highest point of the cliff, the arches and portions of the wall are still visible in the outer wall. On the southside, about 6 meters (20 ft) below the keep, a 10–12 meters (33–39 ft) wide inner courtyard was located. Today this area is occupied by the Hall of Weapons. On the east side near the mill is a small 2 meters (6.6 ft) wide opening in the wall, which was most likely a lower castle gate. The 6 to 8 meters (20 to 26 ft) high outer curtain wall is the foundation of the modern castle building. In the north inner wall of the keep is a small opening, which likely was a hidden passage leading to the Danube.

== Sights ==
The castle rooms on the tour are full of ornate furniture, paintings and valuable porcelain objects. The rooms give the visitor a taste of the lifestyle of the nobility in previous centuries. Collections of pre- and ancient historical objects are on display as well as works from swabian artists, carvers and metalworkers. The Hall of Weapons displays one of the largest private weapon collections in Europe, covering everything from the Middle Ages to modern times. The Marstall museum contains the princely fleet of carriages.

=== The weapon collection ===
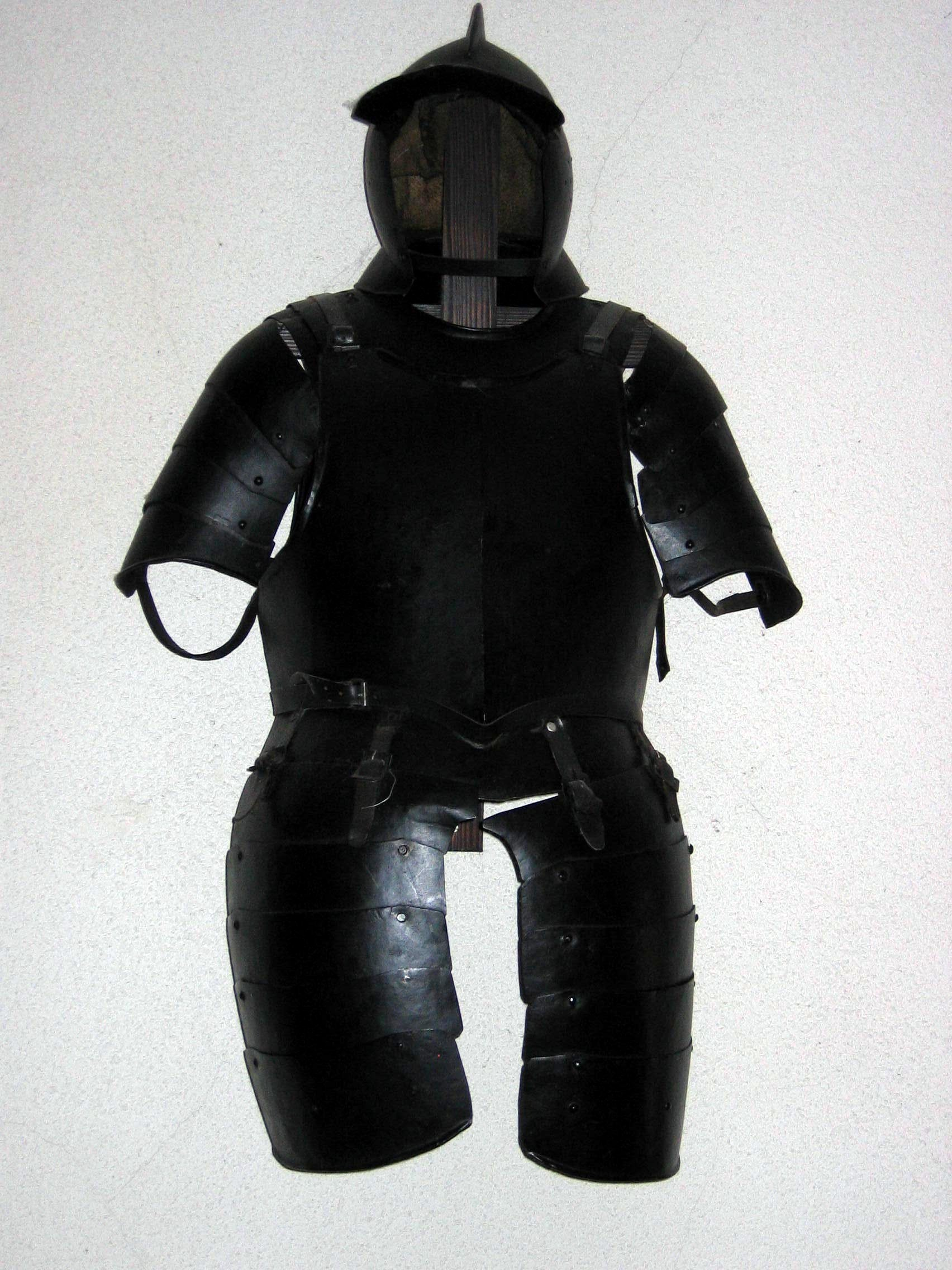
A suit of armor on display in the Schloss

The weapon collection in Schloss Sigmaringen contains over 3000 different examples of weapons and armor. Prince Karl Anton's passion for collecting weapons resulted in the creation of this collection. The collection shows the evolution of weapons from the 14th century to the 20th century. In addition to weapons, the collection also includes protective items such as shields, armor and handguns. Particularly noteworthy are such rare objects dating from the 15th century as a German multi-barrel gun, a body shield and a richly engraved helmet once belonging to a royal bodyguard from ca.1622. The collection includes not just European weapons but also weapons that were considered exotic, such as Persian weapons and the full equipment of a Japanese samurai.

In the Galeriebau (English: Gallery Building), built from 1862 to 1867 under Prince Karl Anton, west of the castle is a collection of medieval torture instruments. The torture chamber with its instruments illustrates an earlier sense of justice.

=== Pre- and Ancient History Collection ===
In addition to the torture museum, the Galeriebau also houses a Pre and Ancient history museum. The collections give a picture of life from the Stone Age until the end of the Merovingian dynasty (10.000 B.C. until 700 A.D.). It also includes artifacts from the Roman settlements around Sigmaringen. Karl Anton wasn't just fascinated by weapons and hunting, he also loved history and archeology. In 1881 during construction of a canal in the Sigmaringen Market Square, Roman pottery shards and iron work were found. This discovery excited Karl Anton, and he ordered a member of the court F. A. von Lehner to search for and archeologically explore the Villa Rustica in the area. Finds from this Roman estate as well as other nearby estates are including in the collection.

=== Marstallmuseum ===
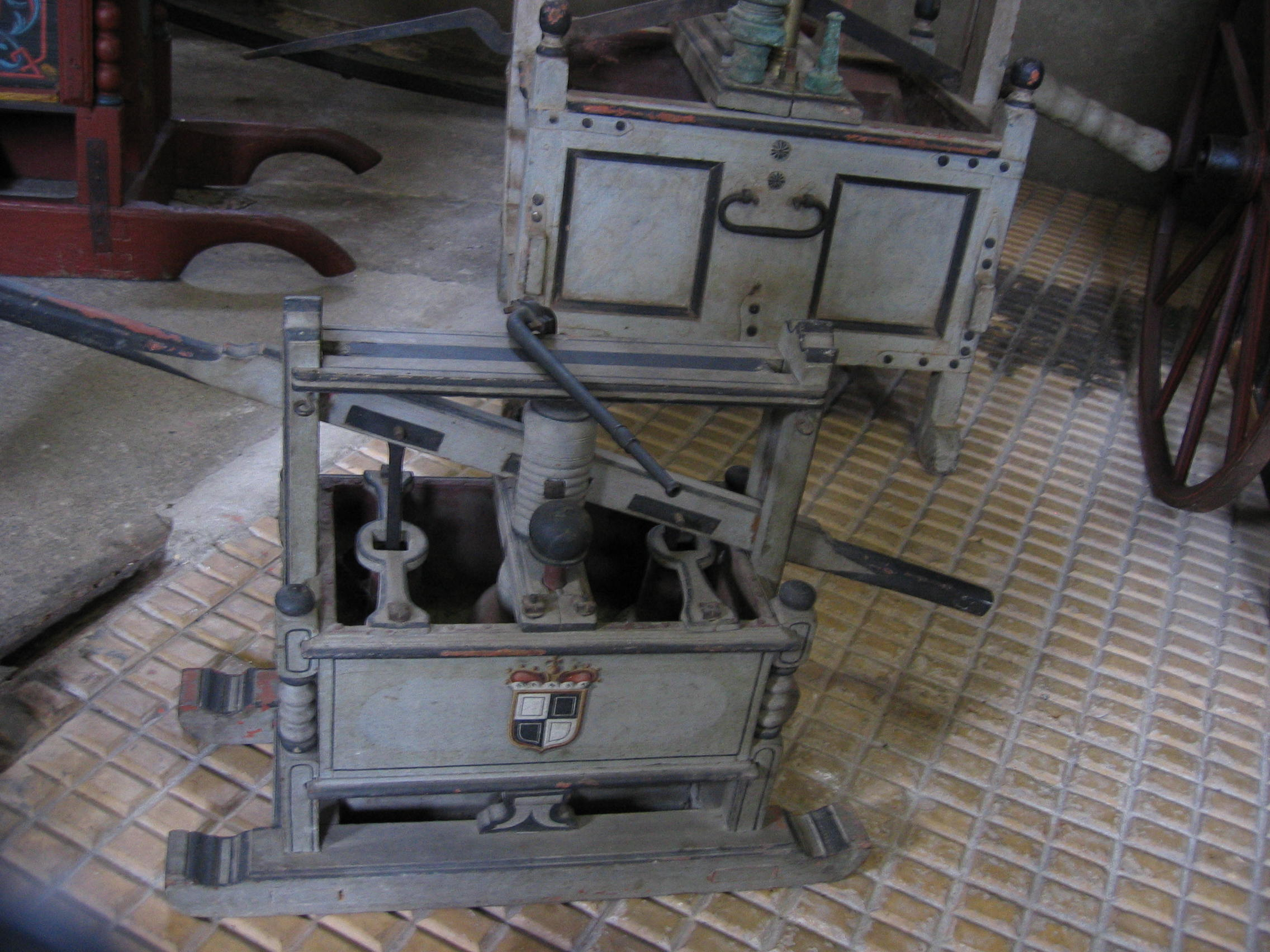
Manual firefighting pump located in the Marstall Museum

Located south west of the castle is the royal stables (German: Marstall). The building now houses the Marstallmuseum, a collection of princely carriages. Carriages, coaches, sleds and sedan chairs are presented in an open building. Additionally, equipment for the horses including saddles, horse shoes and spurs, are on display in the museum. One of the exhibits, a manual firefighting pump dates back to the fire in the castle in 1893. The fire raged for three days because the connections on the modern firefighting equipment didn't match the castle's connections. Water had to be brought up by a human chain in buckets from the Danube to the castle.

== Visiting the castle ==
The castle may only be visited as part of a tour. The tours are in German only, though translated guides are available. The castle is open in March and April from 9:30 am to 4:30 pm, May to October from 9:00 a.m. to 5:00 p.m., and November to February from 10:00 a.m. to 3:30 p.m.

== See also ==
- List of castles in Baden-Württemberg
