= 1769 =

1769 in various calendars
- Gregorian calendar: 1769; MDCCLXIX
- Ab urbe condita: 2522
- Armenian calendar: 1218; ԹՎ ՌՄԺԸ
- Assyrian calendar: 6519
- Balinese saka calendar: 1690–1691
- Bengali calendar: 1175–1176
- Berber calendar: 2719
- British Regnal year: 9 Geo. 3 – 10 Geo. 3
- Buddhist calendar: 2313
- Burmese calendar: 1131
- Byzantine calendar: 7277–7278
- Chinese calendar: 戊子年 (Earth Rat); 4466 or 4259 — to — 己丑年 (Earth Ox); 4467 or 4260
- Coptic calendar: 1485–1486
- Discordian calendar: 2935
- Ethiopian calendar: 1761–1762
- Hebrew calendar: 5529–5530
- Hindu calendars
- Vikram Samvat: 1825–1826
- Shaka Samvat: 1690–1691
- Kali Yuga: 4869–4870
- Holocene calendar: 11769
- Igbo calendar: 769–770
- Iranian calendar: 1147–1148
- Islamic calendar: 1182–1183
- Japanese calendar: Meiwa 6 (明和６年)
- Javanese calendar: 1694–1695
- Julian calendar: Gregorian minus 11 days
- Korean calendar: 4102
- Minguo calendar: 143 before ROC 民前143年
- Nanakshahi calendar: 301
- Thai solar calendar: 2311–2312
- Tibetan calendar: ས་ཕོ་བྱི་བ་ལོ་ (male Earth-Rat); 1895 or 1514 or 742 — to — ས་མོ་གླང་ལོ་ (female Earth-Ox); 1896 or 1515 or 743

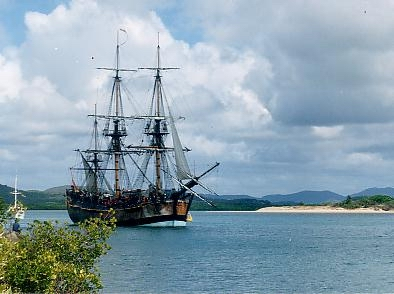
April 13: James Cook arrives in Tahiti on the Endeavour.

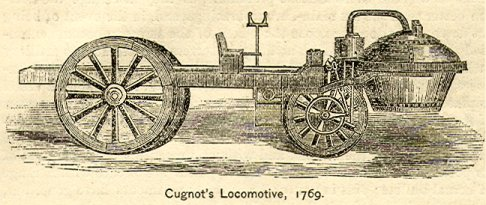
October 23: Nicolas-Joseph Cugnot demonstrates first steam-powered vehicle.

1769 (MDCCLXIX) was a common year starting on Sunday of the Gregorian calendar and a common year starting on Thursday of the Julian calendar, the 1769th year of the Common Era (CE) and Anno Domini (AD) designations, the 769th year of the 2nd millennium, the 69th year of the 18th century, and the 10th and last year of the 1760s decade. As of the start of 1769, the Gregorian calendar was 11 days ahead of the Julian calendar, which remained in localized use until 1923.

== Events ==
=== January–March ===
- February 2 – Pope Clement XIII dies, the night before preparing an order to dissolve the Jesuits.
- February 17 – The British House of Commons votes not to allow MP John Wilkes to take his seat after he wins a by-election, on the grounds that he was an outlaw when standing.
- March 4 – Mozart departs Italy, after the last of his three tours there.
- March 16 – Louis Antoine de Bougainville returns to Saint-Malo, following a three-year circumnavigation of the world with the ships Boudeuse and Étoile, with the loss of only seven out of 330 men; among the members of the expedition is Jeanne Baré, the first woman known to have circumnavigated the globe. She returns to France some time after Bougainville and his ships.

=== April–June ===
- April 13 – James Cook arrives in Tahiti, on the ship HM Bark Endeavour, preparing for the 1769 Transit of Venus observed from Tahiti on June 3. After the voyage, the data is found to be inaccurate in determining the distance between the Sun and Earth.
- April 29 – Scottish inventor James Watt is granted a British patent for "A method of lessening the consumption of steam in steam engines" – the separate condenser, a key improvement (first devised by Watt in 1765) and the basis for the Watt steam engine which stimulates the Industrial Revolution.
- May 9 – France conquers Corsica, ending the Corsican War of Independence.
- May 14 – Charles III of Spain sends Spanish missionaries, who found California missions in San Diego, Santa Barbara, San Francisco and Monterey, and begin the settlement of California.
- May 19 – Cardinal Giovanni Vincenzo Antonio Ganganelli is elected as the 249th pope, succeeding the late Clement XIII and choosing to take the regnal name of Pope Clement XIV.
- June 3 – A transit of Venus is followed five hours later by a total solar eclipse, the shortest such interval in historical times. The transit is viewed by King George III of Great Britain, at the Kew Observatory.
- June 7 – Frontiersman Daniel Boone first begins to explore modern-day Kentucky.

=== July–September ===
- July 3 – Richard Arkwright patents a spinning frame in England, able to spin threads mechanically.
- July 16 – Father Junípero Serra founds Mission San Diego de Alcalá, the first of the 21 California missions.
- July 20 – Recently appointed as the Governor of Spanish Louisiana, Irish-born soldier of fortune Alejandro O'Reilly sails into the French fort of La Balize with 21 Spanish ships, along with 2,056 soldiers, cannons and ammunition, and informs French Louisiana Governor Charles Philippe Aubry of his royal commission to take Louisiana on behalf of the King of Spain.
- August 3 – The party of Gaspar de Portolà becomes the first white group to set foot in the area now known as Santa Monica, California.
- August 18 – Brescia Explosion: The city of Brescia, Italy is devastated when the Church of San Nazaro is struck by lightning. The resulting fire ignites 200,000 lb (90,000 kg) of gunpowder being stored there, causing a massive explosion, which destroys 1/6 of the city and kills 3,000 people.
- September – Massive droughts in Bengal lead to the Bengal famine of 1770, in which ten million people, a third of the population, will die, the worst natural disaster in human history (in terms of lives lost).
- September 6–9 – David Garrick holds a Shakespeare Jubilee festival at Stratford-upon-Avon in England.
- September 10 – Russo-Turkish War (1768–1774): Russian forces take the Ottoman fortress of Chocim in Bukovina.

=== October–December ===
- October 1 – James Cook names White Island, off the coast of New Zealand.
- October 7 – James Cook lands in New Zealand, at Poverty Bay.
- October 9 – In the first encounter between the Māori people and Europeans (at the future site of Gisborne, New Zealand), one Maori is shot and killed after he steals a sword from one of the officers of the Cook expedition. Several more Māori are killed in fighting the next day.
- October 23 – Nicolas-Joseph Cugnot demonstrates a steam-powered artillery tractor (see drawing) in France.
- November 1 – A party of the expedition of Spanish explorer Gaspar de Portola becomes the first Europeans to reach San Francisco Bay. Sergeant Jose Francisco de Ortega and his group accidentally discover the area while searching for Drakes Bay in Alta California.
- November 12 –The Gorkhali Army conquer the last standing Malla Kingdom of Bhaktapur marking the end of The Malla dynasty in Nepal.
- November 21 – Ireland's House of Commons rejects a spending bill passed by Great Britain's parliament, by a 94–71 margin.
- December 13 – Dartmouth College is established in Hanover, New Hampshire, as John Wentworth, the Royal Governor, conveys a charter from King George III of Great Britain.
- December 22 – The Sino-Burmese War (1765–69) is ended by a truce.

=== Date unknown ===
- The Authorized King James Version of the Bible is published in England in the Oxford standard text, edited by Benjamin Blayney.
- First recorded use of 'literally' as a metaphorical intensifier.

== Births ==
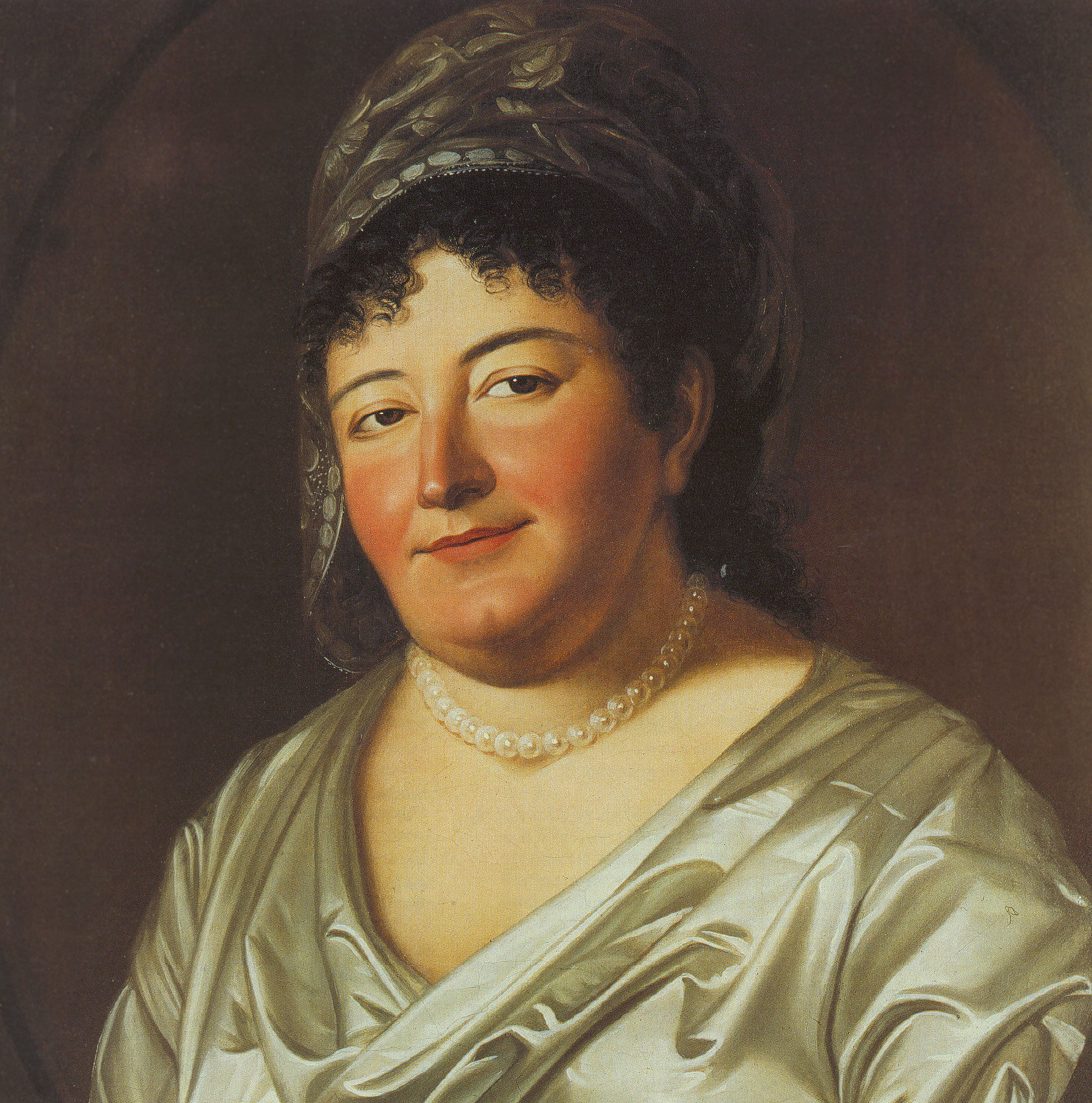
Princess Pauline of Anhalt-Bernburg

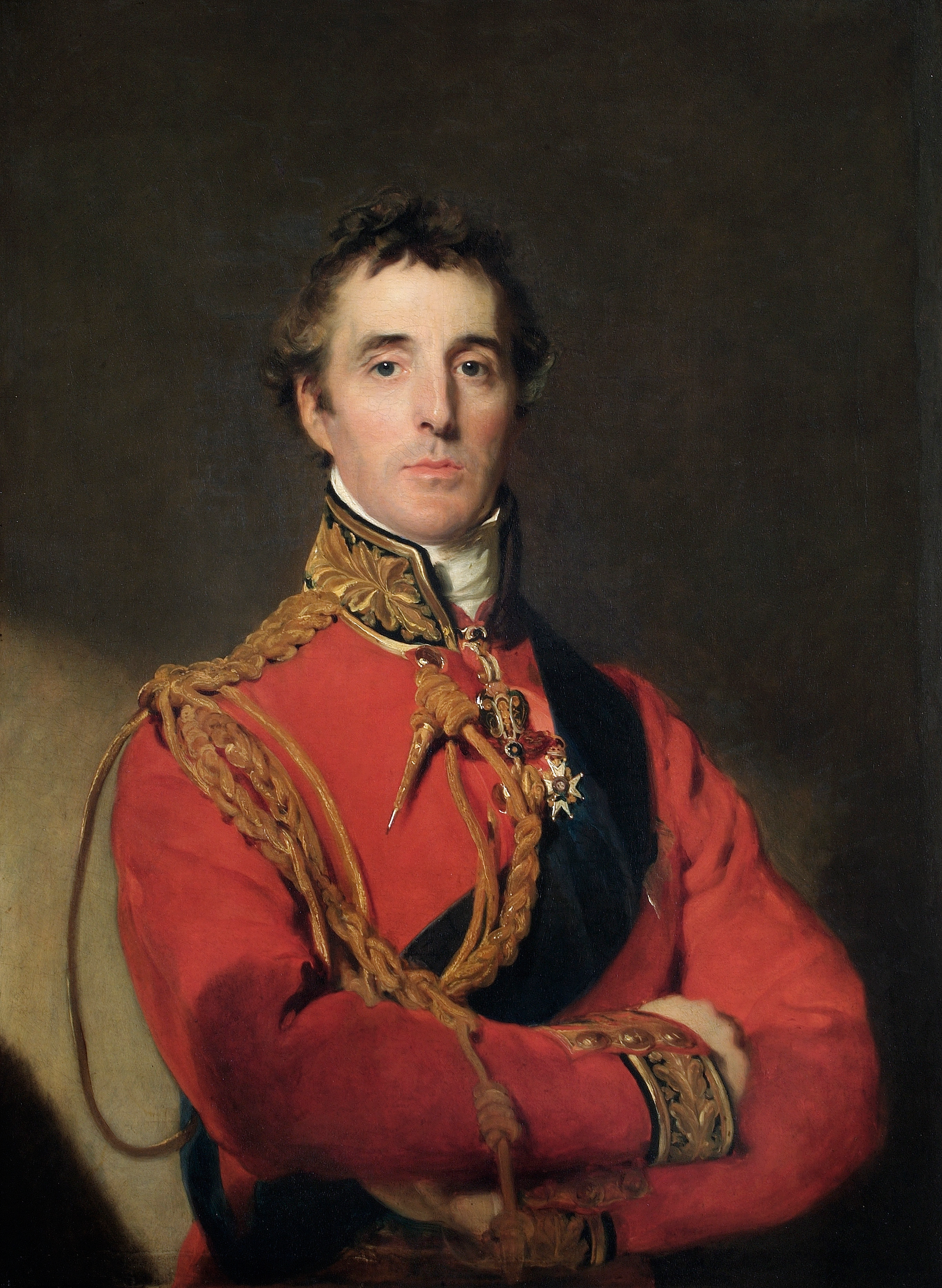
Arthur Wellesley, 1st Duke of Wellington

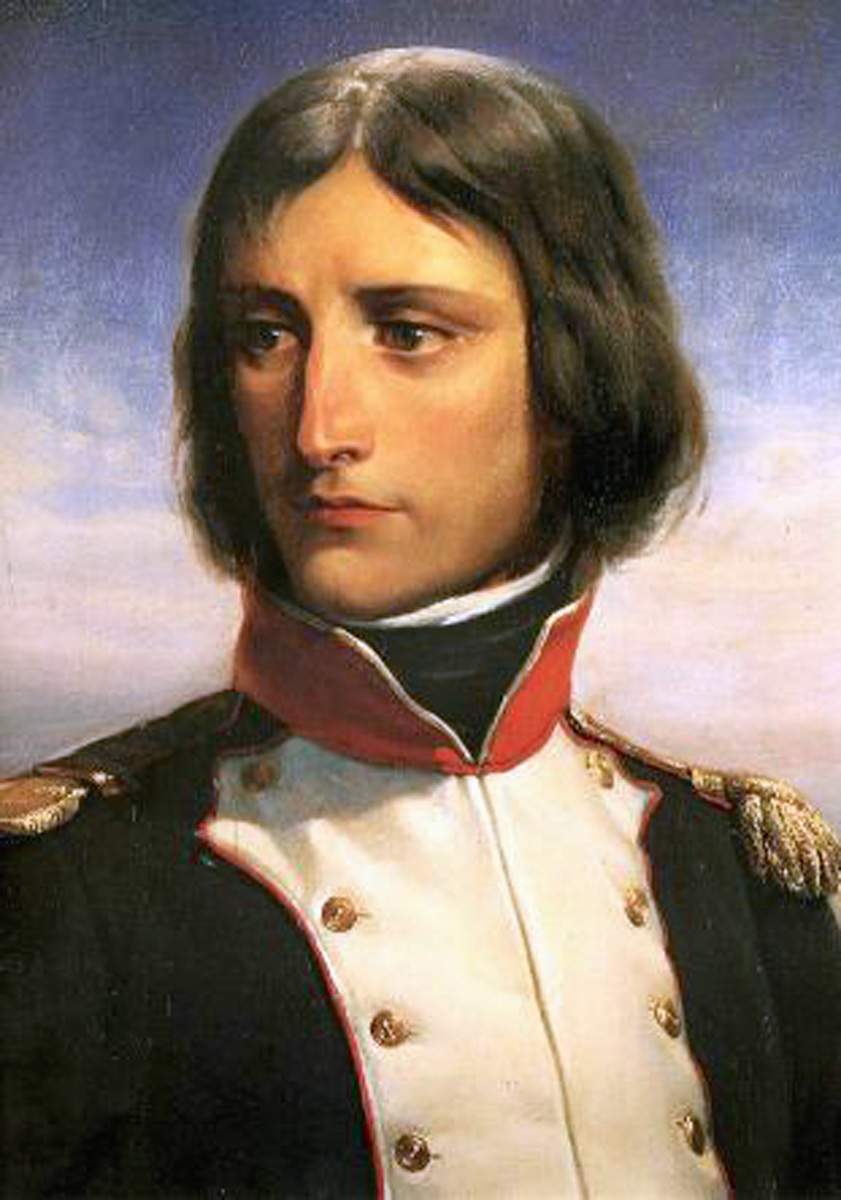
Napoleon

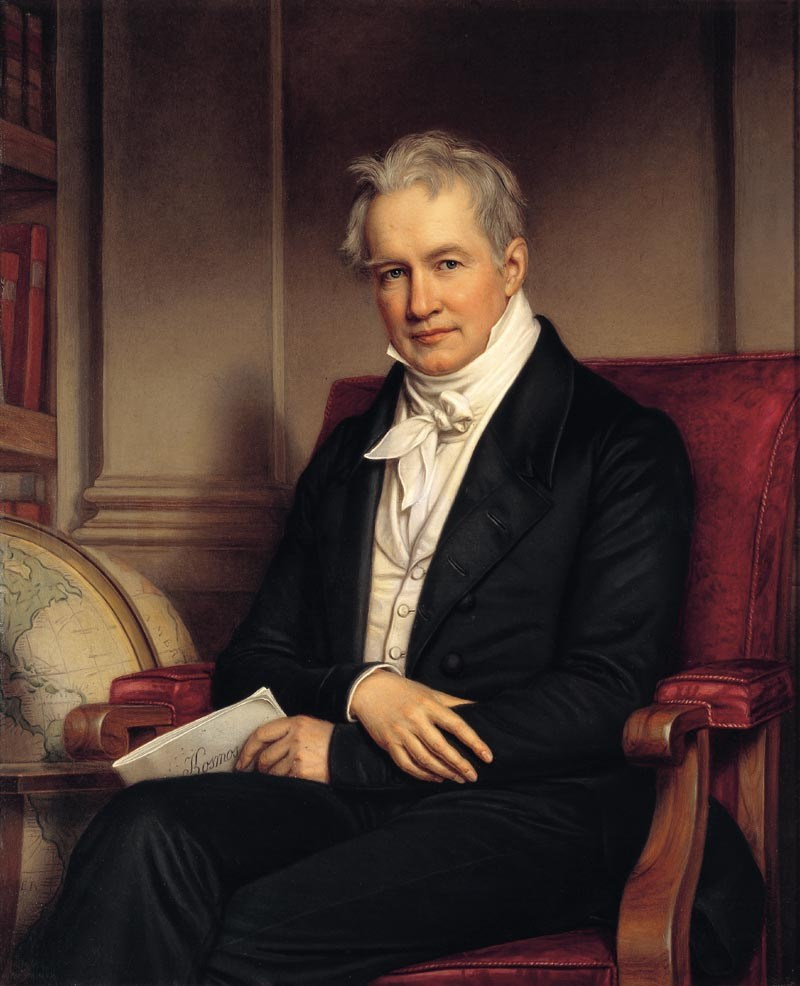
Alexander von Humboldt

- January 1
  - Marie Lachapelle, French obstetrician (d. 1821)
  - Jane Marcet, British science writer (d. 1858)
- January 2 – Nannette Streicher, German piano maker, composer, music educator and writer (d. 1833)
- January 10 – Michel Ney, French marshal (d. 1815)
- February 23 – Princess Pauline of Anhalt-Bernburg; German regent and social reformer (d. 1820)
- March 1 – François Séverin Marceau-Desgraviers, French general (d. 1796)
- March 2 – DeWitt Clinton, American politician and naturalist, 6th Governor of New York (d. 1828)
- March 4 – Muhammad Ali of Egypt, Egyptian ruler (d. 1849)
- March 8 – Samuel Richards, American ironmaster (d. 1842)
- March 10 – Joseph Williamson, English philanthropist, builder of the Williamson Tunnels (d. 1840)
- March 23 – William Smith, English geologist, cartographer (d. 1839)
- March 29 – Jean-de-Dieu Soult, French marshal (d. 1851)
- April 3 – Christian Günther von Bernstorff, Danish and Prussian statesman and diplomat (d. 1835)
- April 9 – Jakob Heinrich Laspeyres, German lepidopterist (d. 1809)
- April 10 – Jean Lannes, French marshal (d. 1809)
- April 13 – Thomas Lawrence, English painter (d. 1830)
- April 14 – Barthélemy Catherine Joubert, French general (d. 1799)
- April 25 – Marc Isambard Brunel, French-British engineer (d. 1849)
- May 1 – Arthur Wellesley, 1st Duke of Wellington, British general, Prime Minister of the United Kingdom (d. 1852)
- May 6 – Ferdinand III of Tuscany (d. 1824)
- June 5 – Marianne Kirchgessner, German musician (d. 1808)
- June 18 – Robert Stewart, Viscount Castlereagh, British statesman, diplomat, and soldier (suicide 1822)
- July 28 – Hudson Lowe, Irish-born soldier and future jailer of Napoleon on Saint Helena (d. 1831)
- August 15 – Napoleon Bonaparte, French Emperor (d. 1821)
- August 23 – Georges Cuvier, French naturalist and zoologist; known as the Father of Paleontology (d. 1832)
- August 31 – David Hosack American physician and botanist, a Hamilton family doctor (d. 1835)
- September 14
  - Alexander von Humboldt, German explorer, scientist (d. 1859)
  - Karl Salomo Zachariae von Lingenthal, German jurist (d. 1843)
- October 6 – Isaac Brock, British general, administrator (d. 1812)
- December 13 – James Scarlett Abinger, English judge (d. 1844)
- December 23 – Martin Archer Shee, Irish painter (d. 1850)
- December 26 – Ernst Moritz Arndt, German writer, poet (d. 1860)
- date unknown
  - James Dadford, English canal engineer
  - John Bellingham, assassin of British Prime Minister Spencer Perceval (d. 1812)
  - Howqua, Chinese merchant (d. 1843)
- probable
  - John Henry Colclough, Irish revolutionary (d. 1798)

== Deaths ==
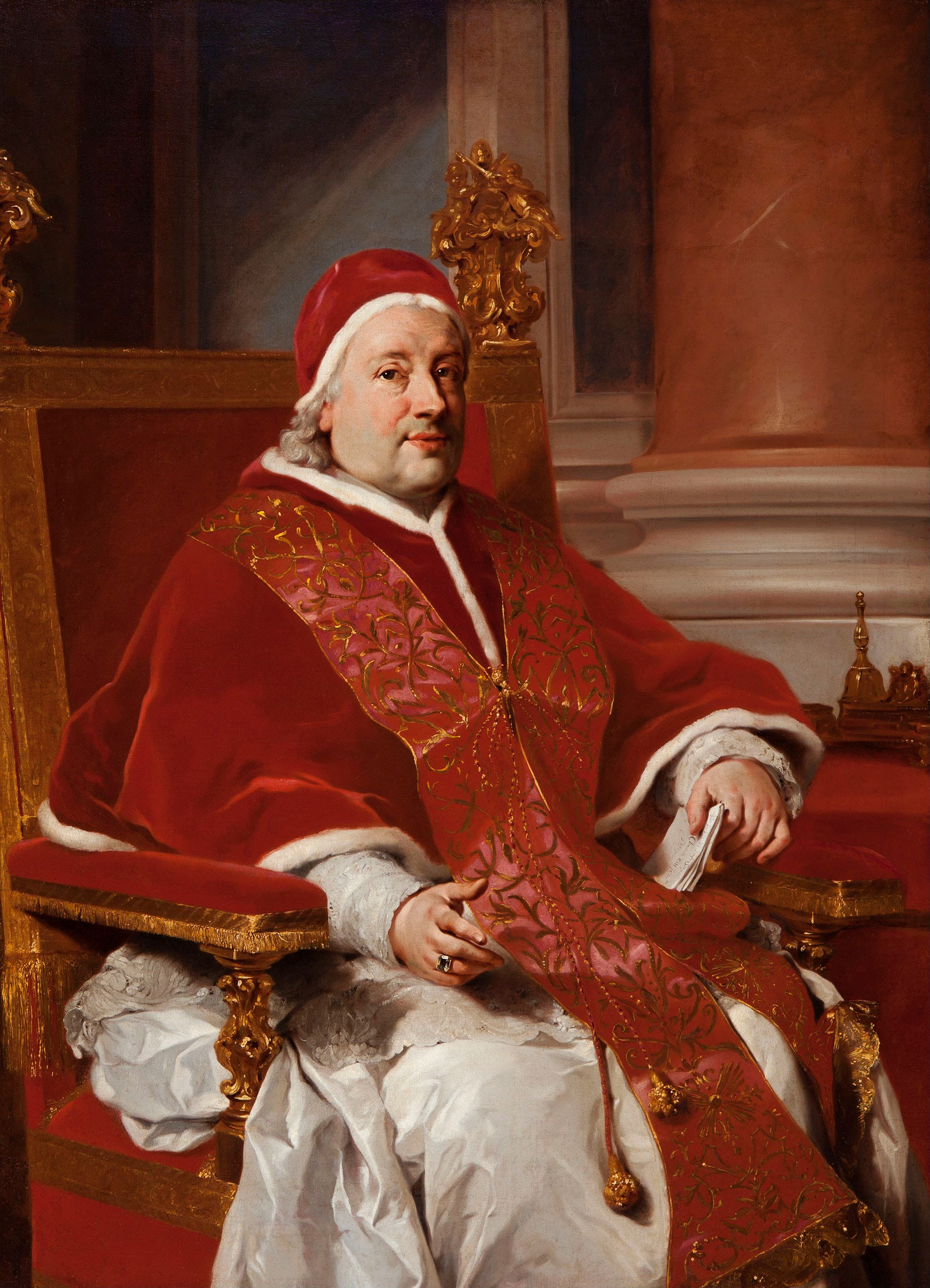
Pope Clement XIII

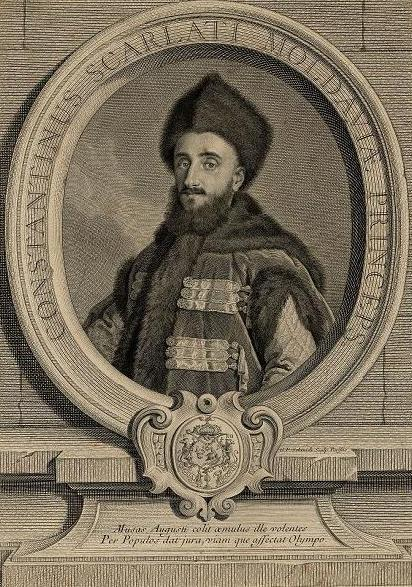
Prince Constantine Mavrocordatos

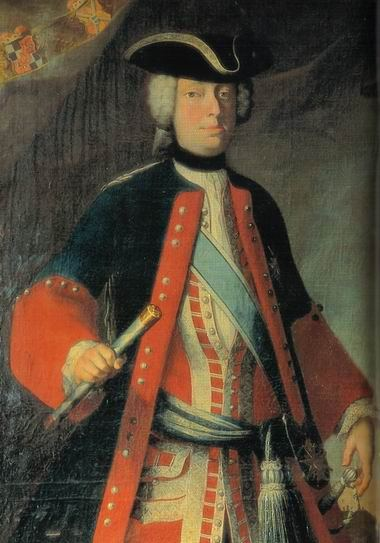
Joseph Friedrich Ernst, Prince of Hohenzollern-Sigmaringen

- January 5 – Charles Sackville, 2nd Duke of Dorset, English cricketer (b. 1711)
- February 2 – Pope Clement XIII (b. 1693)
- March 6 – Andrew Lauder, Burgess of the Royal Burgh of Lauder (1 August 1737) (b. 1702)
- March 28 – Johann Friedrich Endersch, German cartographer (b. 1705)
- April 5 – Marc-Antoine Laugier, French Jesuit priest, architectural theorist (b. 1713)
- April 13 – Anna Canalis di Cumiana, morganatic spouse of Victor Amadeus II of Savoy (b. 1680)
- April 20 – Chief Pontiac, Ottawa chief (murdered) (b. c. 1719)
- April 21 – John Gilbert Cooper, British poet and writer (b. 1722)
- May 14 – Iyoas I, Emperor of Ethiopia.
- June 1 – Edward Holyoke, American President of Harvard University (b. 1689)
- June 28 – Elisabeth Stierncrona, Swedish noble (b. 1714)
- August 1 – Jean-Baptiste Chappe d'Auteroche, French astronomer (b. 1722)
- August 2 – Daniel Finch, 8th Earl of Winchilsea, English politician (b. 1689)
- August 29 – Edmond Hoyle, English game expert (b. 1672)
- September 22 – Antonio Genovesi, Italian philosopher (b. 1712)
- September 23 – Michel Ferdinand d'Albert d'Ailly, French astronomer (b. 1714)
- September 27 – Anna Karolina Orzelska, Polish adventurer (b. 1707)
- November 3 – Diane Adélaïde de Mailly, third of the five famous French de Nesle sisters (b. 1713)
- November 16 – Henry Paget, 2nd Earl of Uxbridge (b. 1719)
- November 23 – Constantine Mavrocordatos, Prince of Wallachia and Prince of Moldavia (b. 1711)
- November 27 – Kamo no Mabuchi, Japanese poet, philologist (b. 1697)
- December 8 – Joseph Friedrich Ernst, Prince of Hohenzollern-Sigmaringen (b. 1702)
- December 13 – Christian Fürchtegott Gellert, German poet (b. 1715)
- December 30 – Nicholas Taaffe, 6th Viscount Taaffe, Austrian soldier (b. 1685)
- date unknown
  - King Suremphaa of Assam
  - Birgitte Sofie Gabel, Danish noble (b. 1746)
