= Karl Friedrich, Prince of Hohenzollern-Sigmaringen =

Prince of Hohenzollern-Sigmaringen (1769-1785)

Karl Friedrich
- Prince of Hohenzollern-Sigmaringen

Prince of Hohenzollern-Sigmaringen
- Reign: 8 December 1769–20 December 1785
- Predecessor: Joseph Friedrich
- Successor: Anton Aloys
- Born: 9 January 1724; Sigmaringen
- Died: 20 December 1785 (aged 61); Krauchenwies
- Spouse: Johanna of Hohenzollern-Bergh (m. 1749)
- Issue: Anton Aloys; Johanna Franziska, Princess of Salm-Kyburg; Maria Kreszentia, Lady of Holzen and Countess of Treuberg.
- House: House of Hohenzollern-Sigmaringen
- Father: Joseph Friedrich Ernst, Prince of Hohenzollern-Sigmaringen
- Mother: Maria Franziska of Oettingen-Spielberg

Karl Friedrich (9 January 1724 – 20 December 1785) was a member of the House of Hohenzollern and Prince of Hohenzollern-Sigmaringen, Lord of Haigerloch and Wehrstein from 1769 until his death.

Born in Sigmaringen, he was the eldest son of Joseph Friedrich Ernst, Prince of Hohenzollern-Sigmaringen and his first wife, Maria Franziska Louise of Oettingen-Spielberg. From the nine children that his father produced in his first and second marriage, only Karl Friedrich and a young full-sister, Maria Johanna (who became a nun) survived to adulthood.

== Life ==
Karl Friedrich was first educated in Sigmaringen and Munich. Later, he went to the Universities of Freiburg, Göttingen and Ingolstadt. He returned to Sigmaringen in 1746 and soon parted on the customary Grand Tour (a kind of educational trip) through Germany, Austria and Italy.

During his stay in the Netherlands visiting relatives, he met his future wife. On 2 March 1749 at the Kail Castle, Karl Friedrich married with his first-cousin Johanna Josephina Antonia (14 April 1727 – 22 February 1787), a daughter of Count Franz Wilhelm of Hohenzollern-Berg. The wedding took place not only for political reasons, but Karl Friedrich had a deep affection for his bride. Johanna was the heiress of the rich Dutch County of Bergh-'s-Heerenberg, and for this they spent more time in their Dutch states than in the Principality of Sigmaringen.

Karl Friedrich sided with Empress Maria Theresa of Austria against Prussia during the Seven Years' War. Until 1763 he served in the cavalry regiment as part of the troops of the Swabian Empire Circle. During the conflict, he mostly fought against Friedrich Wilhelm von Seydlitz, leader of the Prussian cavalry.

In the Principality of Sigmaringen the military conflict had virtually no repercussions, a fact which favored the development of the local economy. Karl Friedrich was Erbkämmerer of the Holy Roman Empire and Field Marshal Lieutenant (Feldmarschall-Leutnant) of the Swabian Empire Circle. Despite his military activities, he was very enthusiastic for hunting.

== Issue ==
- Friedrich Joseph Fidelis Anton (29 May 1750 – 17 August 1750)
- Johann Baptist Friedrich Fidelis (born and died 18 August 1751)
- Anton Joachim Georg Franz (12 July 1752 – 1 November 1752)
- Fidelis Joseph Anton Franz (11 July 1753 – 6 February 1754)
- Marie Franziska Anna Antonia (8 August 1754 – 22 April 1755)
- Joachim Adam (15 August 1755 – 22 March 1756)
- Joseph Friedrich Fidelis (17 June 1758 – 12 September 1759)
- Franz Konrad Maria Fidelis (12 July 1761 – 18 July 1762)
- Anton Aloys Meinrad Franz (20 June 1762 – 17 October 1831), Prince of Hohenzollern-Sigmaringen
- Fidelia Theresia Karoline Creszentia (27 October 1763 - 3 November 1763)
- Johanna Franziska Antonia (3 May 1765 – 23 August 1790), married in 1781 to Frederick III, Prince of Salm-Kyrburg
- Maria Kreszentia (23 July 1766 – 5 May 1844), created Lady of Holzen on 12 June 1813; married in 1807 to Franz Xaver Fischler, Count of Treuberg

== Ancestry ==
Ancestors of Karl Friedrich, Prince of Hohenzollern-Sigmaringen

8. Maximilian I, Prince of Hohenzollern-Sigmaringen
4. Meinrad II, Prince of Hohenzollern-Sigmaringen
9. Countess Maria Clara of Berg-'s-Heerenberg
2. Joseph Franz Ernst, Prince of Hohenzollern-Sigmaringen
10. Count Johann Anton I. of Montfort-Tettnang
5. Countess Johanna Catharina of Montfort
11. Countess Maria Viktorina of Spaur and Flavon
1. Karl Friedrich, Prince of Hohenzollern-Sigmaringen
12. Count Johann Franz of Oettingen-Spielberg
6. Prince Franz Albrecht of Oettingen-Spielberg
13. Ludovike Rosalie of Attems-Tanzenberg
3. Countess Maria Franziska Luise of Oettingen-Spielberg
14. Franz Ignaz of Schwendi
7. Johanna von Schwendi
15. Maria Margarethe Johanna Fugger-Kirchheim of Glott

Karl Friedrich, Prince of Hohenzollern-Sigmaringen House of Hohenzollern Born: 9 January 1724 Died: 20 December 1785
Preceded by Joseph Friedrich Ernst	Prince of Hohenzollern-Sigmaringen; 1769–1785	Succeeded by Anton Aloys
