= Maximilian I of Hohenzollern-Sigmaringen =

Prince of Hohenzollern-Sigmaringen (1681-1689)

Maximilian I, Prince of Hohenzollern-Sigmaringen
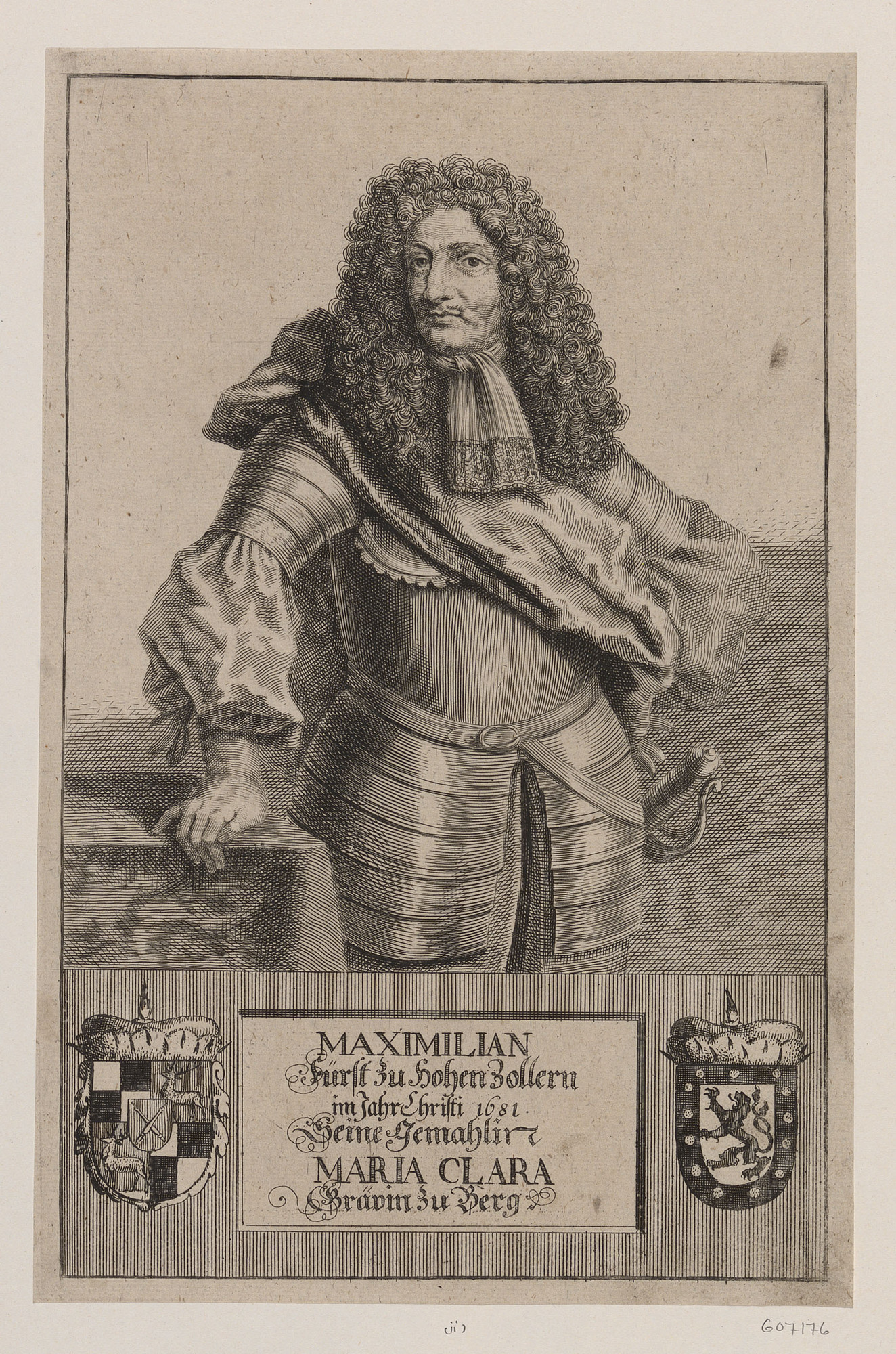
- Engraving of Maximilian I, 1703
- Born: 20 January 1636
- Died: 13 August 1689 (aged 53); Sigmaringen
- Noble family: House of Hohenzollern
- Spouse: Maria Clara of Berg-'s-Heerenberg
- Father: Meinrad I, Prince of Hohenzollern-Sigmaringen
- Mother: Anna Marie of Törring at Seefeld

Maximilian I, Prince of Hohenzollern-Sigmaringen (20 January 1636 – 13 August 1689, in Sigmaringen) was a German nobleman. He was the third ruling Prince of Hohenzollern-Sigmaringen; he ruled from 1681 until his death.

== Life ==
Maximilian was the son of Prince Meinrad I (1605-1681) from his marriage to Anna Marie (1613-1682), daughter of Ferdinand Baron of Törring at Seefeld. He was named after Elector Maximilian I of Bavaria, whom his father was serving at the time of his birth.

He joined the Imperial army, together with his younger brother Francis Anthony. He commanded a Dragoon regiment and, like his cousins in the Hohenzollern-Hechingen line, fought under Emperor Leopold I in the Fourth Austro-Turkish War. During the Franco-Dutch War, he commanded the imperial army on the Rhine. After the Peace of Nijmegen of 1675, Maximilian returned to Vienna.

Maximilian married Maria Clara in Boxmeer on 12 January 1666. She was the daughter of Count Albert of Berg-'s-Heerenberg. After the death of her brother Oswald III in 1712, she inherited the County of 's-Heerenberg, which thus fell to the House of Hohenzollern. Among his Dutch possessions were the Lordships of Boxmeer, Bergh, Diksmuide, Gendringen, Etten, Wisch, Pannerden and Millingen.

In 1681, his father died. Maximilian divided the inheritance with his brother. Francis Anthony received the County of Haigerloch; Maximilian received the original County of Sigmaringen. He initiated various construction projects in the town of Sigmaringen, among them an expansion of Sigmaringen Castle.

== Marriage and issue ==
From his marriage to Maria Clara, the following children:

- Anna Maria (1666-1668)
- Maria Magdalena Clara (1668-1725), a nun in Gnadenthal Abbey
- Cleopha Maria Theresa (1669-1731), a nun in Buchau Abbey
- Meinrad II Charles Anthony (1673-1715), Prince of Hohenzollern-Sigmaringen, married in 1700 to Countess Johanna Katharina von Montfort (1678-1759)
- Francis Albert Oswald (1676-1748), a canon in Cologne
- Francis Henry (1678-1731), a canon in Cologne and Augsburg
- Charles Anthony (1679-1684)
- Anthony Sidonius (1681-1719), fell in battle, married in 1712 to Countess Maria Josepha of Verdenberg and Namiest (1687-1745)
- Prince John Francis Anthony of Hohenzollern-Sigmaringen (1683-1733) fell in battle, married:
  1. in 1712 to Maria Barbara Everhardt of Lightemhaag
  2. Maria Antonia of Frauenberg (b. 1705)
- Maximilian Froben Maria (1685-1734), a monk
- Charles (1687-1689)
- Friederike Christiane Maria (1688-1745), married in 1718 to Sebastian, Count of Montfort-Tettnang (1684-1728)

== Ancestry ==
Ancestors of Maximilian I of Hohenzollern-Sigmaringen

16. Karl I, Count of Hohenzollern (= 20)
8. Charles II, Count of Hohenzollern-Sigmaringen
17. Anna of Baden-Durlach (= 21)
4. Johann, Prince of Hohenzollern-Sigmaringen
18. Frederick V, Count of Oettingen-Wallerstein
9. Countess Euphrosyne of Oettingen-Wallerstein
19. Countess Eufrosine of Oettingen-Wallerstein
2. Meinrad I, Prince of Hohenzollern-Sigmaringen
20. Karl I, Count of Hohenzollern (= 16)
10. Eitel Friedrich IV, Count of Hohenzollern
21. Anna of Baden-Durlach (= 17)
5. Countess Johanna of Hohenzollern-Hechingen
22. Count Froben Christoph of Zimmern
11. Countess Sibylle of Zimmern
23. Kunigunde of Eberstein
1. Maximilian I, Prince of Hohenzollern-Sigmaringen
24. Baron Georg VI of Törring-Seefeld
12. Baron Eustach of Törring-Seefeld
25. Helene of Almb
6. Count Ferdinand I of Törring at Seefeld
26. Count Conrad of Bemelberg
13. Countess Catharina of Bemelberg-Hohenburg
27. Catherine of Helfenstein
3. Baroness Anna Marie of Törring at Seefeld
28. Count Otto Heinrich I of Schwarzenberg
14. Count Wolfgang Jacob of Schwarzenberg
29. Elisabeth of Puchberg
7. Countess Renata of Schwarzenberg
30. Markus Fugger
15. Anna Sibylla of Fugger-Nordendorff
31. Countess Sibylla of Eberstein

== See also ==
- House of Hohenzollern

== Footnotes ==
Maximilian I of Hohenzollern-Sigmaringen House of Hohenzollern Born: 20 January 1636 Died: 13 August 1689
Preceded by Meinrad I	Prince of Hohenzollern-Sigmaringen; 1681-1689	Succeeded by Meinrad II
