= Joseph Friedrich Ernst, Prince of Hohenzollern-Sigmaringen =

Prince of Hohenzollern-Sigmaringen (1715-1769), Imperial Military Commander

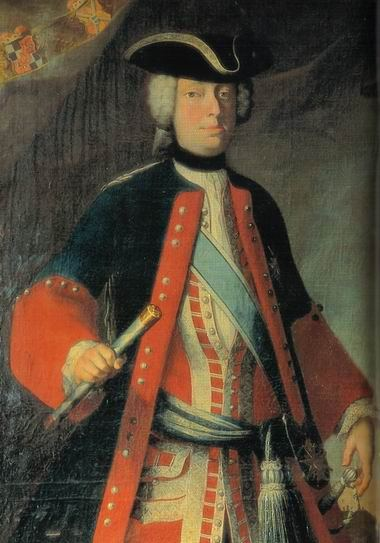
- Portrait of Joseph, 18th century
- Born: 24 May 1702; Sigmaringen
- Died: 8 December 1769 (aged 67); Haag Castle, Haigerloch
- Noble family: House of Hohenzollern
- Spouses: Marie Franziska of Oettingen-Spielberg; Judith of Closen-Arnstorf; Maria Theresa of Waldburg-Trauchburg
- Father: Meinrad II, Prince of Hohenzollern-Sigmaringen
- Mother: Johanna Katharina von Montfort

Prince Joseph Ernst Friedrich Karl Anton Meinrad of Hohenzollern-Sigmaringen (24 May 1702 in Sigmaringen – 8 December 1769 at Haag Castle, Haigerloch) was the fifth Prince of Hohenzollern-Sigmaringen. He ruled from 1715 to 1769.

== Life ==
Joseph was the eldest son of Prince Meinrad II of Hohenzollern-Sigmaringen (1673–1715) from his marriage to Johanna Katharina von Montfort (1678–1759), daughter of Count Johann Anton I of Montfort-Tettnang.

He was initially raised by his mother. However, due to the turmoil of the War of the Spanish Succession, the family moved to his father's residence in Vienna. Joseph continued to be educated in Vienna after his parents returned to Sigmaringen in 1714. After his father's death in 1715, he succeeded as Prince of Hohenzollern-Sigmaringen. However, as he was still a minor, he stood under his mother's regency until 1720. Shortly before 1720, Joseph joined the Austrian army, where he held the rank of General of the Cavalry and later Fieldmarshal Lieutenant of the imperial Swabian Circle.

Joseph managed to befriend the Electorate of Bavaria and after the election, Emperor Charles VII appointed him as imperial Geheimrat.

Joseph was an avid hunter and in 1727, he created the game park Josefslust in Sigmaringen. In 1736, he modernized and remodeled Sigmaringen Castle. He also embellished the local Knight's Hall and added portraits of all his ancestors. In Sigmaringen, he built the St Johann's Church, the St. Joseph Chapel, and the Jagdschloss in Josefslust Park. In Haigerloch, which he preferred as a residence over Sigmaringen, he built the St Anna's Church.

He was known as a patron of the arts. He commissioned works by the artist Johann Michael Feuchtmayer, Johann Georg Weckenmann and Andreas Meinrad von Ow. He supported the canonization of the local saint Fidelis of Sigmaringen. He also supported the school and church life.

== Marriages and Issue ==
In Oettingen on 20 May 1722 Joseph married firstly with Maria Franziska Louise (21 May 1703 – 29 November 1737), daughter of Prince Franz Albrecht of Oettingen-Spielberg, who brought him a considerable fortune. They had six children:

- Karl Friedrich (9 January 1724 – 20 December 1785), Prince of Hohenzollern-Sigmaringen.
- Maria Johanna (13 November 1726 – 9 April 1793), a nun in Buchau.
- Maria Amalia Franziska (8 May 1729 – 4 March 1730).
- Meinrad Ferdinand Joseph (20 October 1732 – 8 June 1733).
- Maria Anna Theresia (born and died 16 August 1736).
- A son (born and died 29 November 1737).

On 5 July 1738 Joseph married secondly with Maria Judith Katharina Philippina (30 April 1718 – 9 May 1743), daughter of Count Franz Anton of Closen, Baron of Arnstorf. They had three children:

- Karl Albrecht Joseph (24 March 1741 – 23 May 1741).
- Maria Amalia Josepha (29 May 1742 – 27 August 1742).
- Maria Theresia Philippina (15 April 1743 – 11 August 1743).

On 22 October 1743 Joseph married thirdly with Maria Theresa (3 March 1696 – 7 May 1761), daughter of Count Franz Christoph of Waldburg at Trauchburg. They had no children.

== Ancestry ==
Ancestors of Joseph Friedrich Ernst, Prince of Hohenzollern-Sigmaringen

16. Johann, Prince of Hohenzollern-Sigmaringen
8. Meinrad I, Prince of Hohenzollern-Sigmaringen
17. Countess Johanna of Hohenzollern-Hechingen
4. Maximilian I, Prince of Hohenzollern-Sigmaringen
18. Count Ferdinand I of Törring at Seefeld
9. Baroness Anna Marie of Törring at Seefeld
19. Renata zu Schwarzenberg
2. Meinrad II, Prince of Hohenzollern-Sigmaringen
20. Frederik van den Bergh
10. Count Albert of Berg ’s-Heerenberg
21. Françoise de Ravenel, Beroness de Renty
5. Countess Maria Clara of Berg-'s-Heerenberg
22. Claude Francois de Cusance
11. Madeleine de Cusance
23. Ernestine of Wittheim-Sebourg-Bautershem
1. Joseph Friedrich Ernst, Prince of Hohenzollern-Sigmaringen
24. Johann Count of Monfort-Tettnang
12. Hugo XV (IV) of Monfort-Tettnang
25. Sibylla of Fugger-Babenhausen
6. Count Johann Anton I. of Montfort-Tettnang
26. Heinrich of Waldburg-Wolfegg
13. Johanna Euphrosyne of Waldburg-Wolfegg-Zeil
27. Maria Jakoba of Hohenzollern-Sigmaringen
3. Countess Johanna Catharina of Montfort
28. Anton of Spaur and Flavon
14. Franz von Spaun und Flavon
29. Emerentie of Preysing
7. Countess Maria Viktorina of Spaur and Flavon
30. Georg of Tannberg
15. Marie Helena von Tannberg
31. Euphrosine of Rechberg

Joseph Friedrich Ernst, Prince of Hohenzollern-Sigmaringen House of Hohenzollern Born: 24 May 1702 Died: 8 December 1769
Preceded by Meinrad II	Prince of Hohenzollern-Sigmaringen; 1715–1769	Succeeded by Karl Friedrich
Preceded by Franz Christoph Anton	Count of Hohenzollern-Haigerloch; 1767–1769	Succeeded by Karl Friedrich
