= Johanna Katharina von Montfort =

German princess

- Princess of Hohenzollern-Sigmaringen
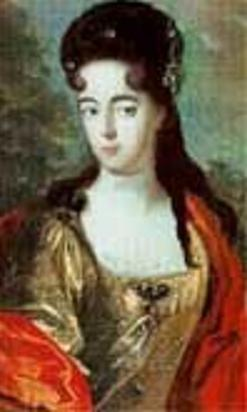
- Portrait, late 17th/early 18th century
- Born: 9 October 1678
- Died: 26 January 1759 (aged 80); Sigmaringen
- Noble family: Montfort (by birth); House of Hohenzollern (by marriage)
- Spouse: Meinrad II, Prince of Hohenzollern-Sigmaringen
- Issue: Joseph Friedrich Ernst, Prince of Hohenzollern-Sigmaringen; Prince Franz William Nikolaus, Count of Hohenzollern-Berg; Princess Maria Anna Elisabeth; Prince Karl Wolfgang Ludwig
- Father: Count Johann Anton I of Montfort-Tettnang
- Mother: Countess Maria Viktoria von Spaur und Flavon

Johanna Katharina Victoria, Princess of Hohenzollern-Sigmaringen (née Countess Johanna Katharina Victoria von Montfort-Tettnang (9 October 1678 - 26 January 1759) was a German noblewoman and consort of Meinrad II. She served as the regent of Hohenzollern-Sigmaringen on behalf of her son, Joseph Friedrich Ernst, Prince of Hohenzollern-Sigmaringen, from 1715 until 1720.

== Biography ==
Johanna Katharina von Montfort was born on 9 October 1678 to Count Johann Anton I of Montfort-Tettnang and his wife, Countess Maria Viktoria von Spaur und Flavon.

On 22 November 1700 she married Meinrad II, Prince of Hohenzollern-Sigmaringen. They had four children:

- Joseph Friedrich Ernst, Prince of Hohenzollern-Sigmaringen (1702-1769)
- Prince Franz William Nikolaus of Hohenzollern-Sigmarigen, Count of Hohenzollern-Berg (1704-1737)
- Princess Maria Anna Elisabeth of Hohenzollern-Sigmarigen (1707-1783)
- Prince Karl Wolfgang Ludwig Anton of Hohenzollern-Sigmarigen (1708-1709)

In 1707 during the War of Spanish Succession, Johanna Katharina fled with her children from Sigmaringen to the family's residence in Vienna. They returned to Sigmaringen after the end of the war. After her husband's death in 1715, their son Joseph Friedrich Ernst succeeded him as the Prince of Hohenzollern-Sigmaringen. She served as regent over Hohenzollern-Sigmaringen for her son from 1715 until 1720, when he came of age. As regent she entrusted the Bistervelde estate to Prussian War Commissary Dozem zu Kleve in 1718.

Johanna Katharina was a Dame of the Order of the Starry Cross.
