= Meinrad II of Hohenzollern-Sigmaringen =

Prince of Hohenzollern-Sigmaringen (1689-1715)

Meinrad II, Prince of Hohenzollern-Sigmaringen
- Born: 1 November 1673; Sigmaringen
- Died: 20 October 1715 (aged 41); Sigmaringen
- Noble family: House of Hohenzollern
- Spouse: Johanna Katharina von Montfort (m. 1700)
- Father: Maximilian I, Prince of Hohenzollern-Sigmaringen
- Mother: Maria Clara of Berg-'s-Heerenberg

Meinrad II Charles Anthony of Hohenzollern-Sigmaringen (1 November 1673 in Sigmaringen – 20 October 1715 in Sigmaringen) was Prince of Hohenzollern-Sigmaringen from 1689 until his death.

== Life ==
Meinrad was a son of Prince Maximilian I of Hohenzollern-Sigmaringen (1636–1689) from his marriage to Maria Clara (1635–1715), the daughter of Count Albert of Berg-s'-Heerenberg. He was still a minor when he succeeded his father in 1689 and initially, he stood under the guardianship of his mother and his uncle Franz Anton, Count of Hohenzollern-Haigerloch.

He studied at the University of Ingolstadt and embarked on a military career. He fought in the Battle of Vienna, the Hungarian rebellion and the Nine Years' War. In 1692, Emperor Leopold I raised the Swabian branch of the House of Hohenzollern to Imperial Princes, under the condition that they would practice primogeniture in the future, i.e. they were not allowed to increase the number of imperial princes by further subdividing their principalities. In 1695, Meinrad II concluded a treaty of inheritance with the Elector of Brandenburg: if either the Swabian or the Brandenburg line of Hohenzollern were to die out, then the other line would inherit their territories.

In 1702, Meinrad's uncle Francis Anthony died. Both his sons had joined the clergy, so Hohenzollern-Haigerloch fell back to Hohenzollern-Sigmaringen.

In 1708, Meinrad founded a blast furnace works in Laucherthal (now part of Sigmaringendorf), which is now owned by Zollern GmbH, a company which is still partially owned by the descendants of the Princes of Hohenzollern.

== Marriage and issue ==
On 22 November 1700 in Sigmaringen, he married Johanna Katharina von Montfort, (1678–1759), a daughter of Count John Anthony I of Montfort-Tettnang. They had the following children:

- Joseph Friedrich Ernst (1702–1769), his successor, married:
  1. in 1722 to Countess Marie of Oettingen-Spielberg (1703–1737)
  2. in 1738 to Countess Judith of Closen (1718–1743)
  3. in 1743 to Countess Maria Theresa of Waldburg-Trauchburg (1696–1761)
- Anna Maria (1707–1783)
- Franz Wilhelm (1704–1737), married in 1724 to Countess Marie Catharina of Waldburg-Zeil-Trauchburg (1702–1739)
- Charles Wolfgang (1708–1709)

== Ancestry ==
Ancestors of Meinrad II of Hohenzollern-Sigmaringen

16. Charles II, Count of Hohenzollern-Sigmaringen
8. Johann, Prince of Hohenzollern-Sigmaringen
17. Countess Euphrosyne of Oettingen-Wallerstein
4. Meinrad I, Prince of Hohenzollern-Sigmaringen
18. Eitel Friedrich IV, Count of Hohenzollern
9. Countess Johanna of Hohenzollern-Hechingen
19. Countess Sibylle of Zimmern
2. Maximilian I, Prince of Hohenzollern-Sigmaringen
20. Baron Eustach of Toerring-Seefeld
10. Count Ferdinand I of Törring at Seefeld
21. Countess Catharina of Bemelberg-Hohenburg
5. Baroness Anna Marie of Törring at Seefeld
22. Wolfgang Jacob of Schwarzenberg
11. Renata zu Schwarzenberg
23. Anna Sibylla of Fugger-Nordendorff
1. Meinrad II, Prince of Hohenzollern-Sigmaringen
24. Willem IV van den Bergh
12. Frederik van den Bergh
25. Maria of Nassau
6. Count Albert of Berg ’s-Heerenberg
26. François de Ravenel, seigneur de Rentigny
13. Françoise de Ravenel, Beroness de Renty
27. Marie de Renty, dame de Brouay
3. Countess Maria Clara of Berg-'s-Heerenberg
28. Evandelin Simon de Cusance, Count de Champlitte
14. Claude Francois de Cusance
29. Countess Beatrix de Vergy
7. Madeleine de Cusance
30. Johan IV Corsselaar van Wittem
15. Ernestine of Wittheim-Sebourg-Bautershem
31. Maria Margaretha van Merode

== See also ==
- House of Hohenzollern

Meinrad II of Hohenzollern-Sigmaringen House of Hohenzollern Born: 1 November 1673 Died: 20 October 1715
Preceded by Maximilian I	Prince of Hohenzollern-Sigmaringen; 1689-1715	Succeeded by Joseph Friedrich Ernst
Preceded by Franz Anton	Count of Hohenzollern-Haigerloch; 1702-1715	Succeeded by Joseph Friedrich Ernst
