= Salm family =

Lotharingian noble family

Salm
- Noble family
- Coat of Arms
- Parent house: House of Ardenne–Luxembourg
- Country: Duchy of Luxembourg; Holy Roman Empire; Austria-Hungary; Belgium
- Founded: 11th century
- Founder: Hermann
- Estate: Salm
- Cadet branches: Salm-Salm; Salm-Horstmar; Salm-Kyrburg; Salm-Reifferscheid

The House of Salm was a medieval Lotharingian noble family originating from Salmchâteau in the Ardennes (present-day Belgium) and ruling Salm. The dynasty is above all known for the experiences of the Upper Salm branch which came to be located at Château de Salm in the Vosges mountain range and over time came to rule over a principality whose capital was Badonviller then Senones.

== History ==
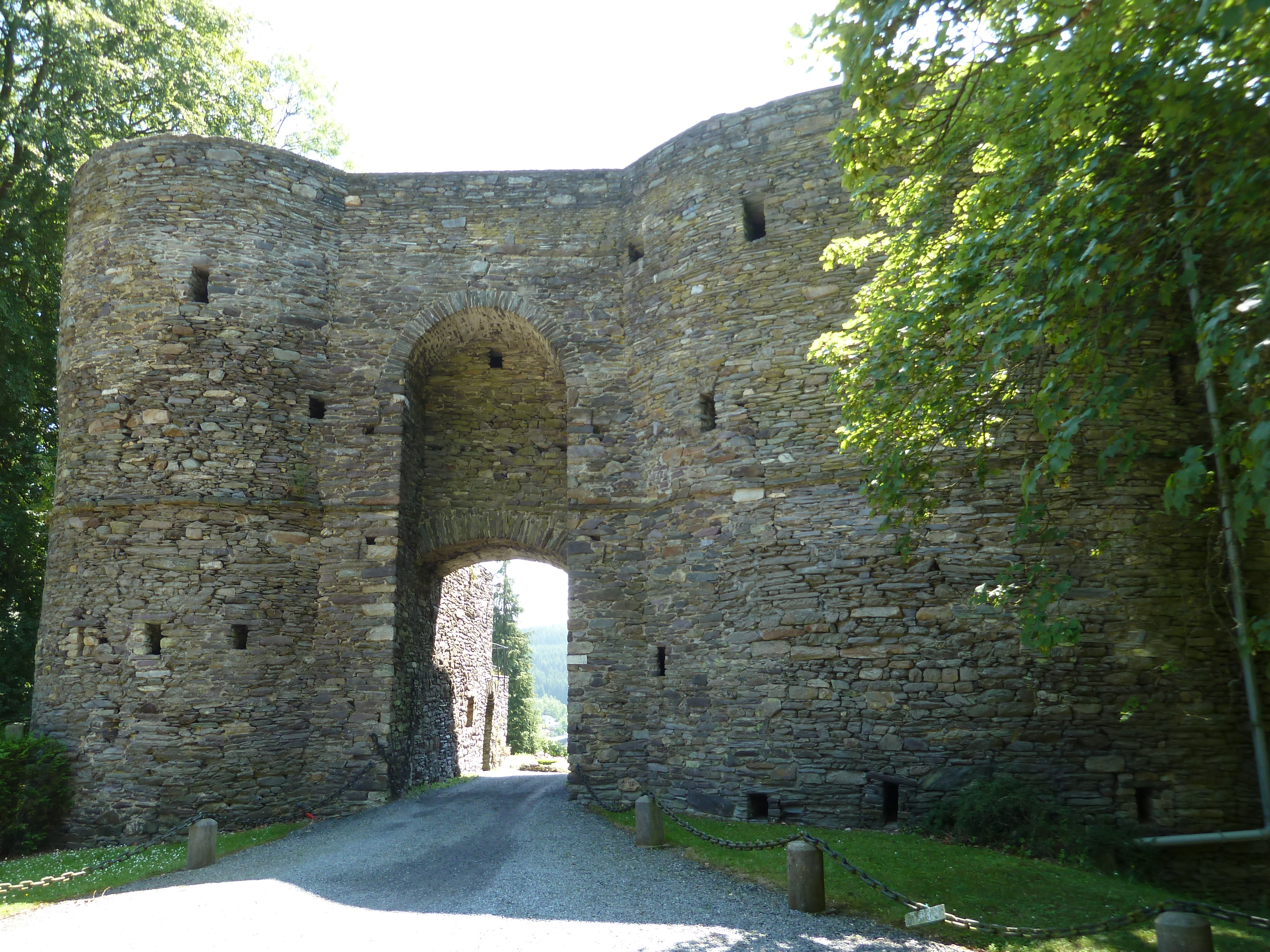
Salmchâteau

The noble family possibly descended from Count Palatine Wigeric of Lotharingia (d. before 923), the founder of the House of Ardenne. His presumable son Sigfried (d. 997) appeared as first Count of Luxembourg about 950. Sigfried's grandson Giselbert (d. 1059), is documented as a Count of Salm in 1036 and as Count of Luxembourg in 1047. When he divided his estates among his heirs, his younger son Hermann received the County of Salm and thereby became the progenitor of the comital dynasty. During the Great Saxon Revolt, he even was elected German anti-king in opposition to King Henry IV in 1081, however, he remained isolated until his death in 1088.

In 1163, Hermann's grandson Count Henry I of Salm (d. before 1174) again divided the estates among his son Henry II and his daughter Elizabeth, who had married Frederick II, Count of Vianden. Henry II received the County of Upper Salm in the Vosges, while Elizabeth and Frederick II founded the comital line of Lower Salm in the Ardennes.

=== Lower Salm ===
The descendants of Elizabeth and Frederick became extinct in 1416. Their possessions were inherited by the Lords of Reifferscheid, who resided at Reifferscheid Castle. The succession arrangement was challenged by the Raugraves, however, they had to accept a 1456 judgement by the Luxembourg councillor Antoine I de Croÿ.

Coat of Arms Altgrave Salm-Reifferscheidt-Raitz

The Salm-Reifferscheid line was later divided into the branches of Salm-Reifferscheid-Bedburg/Krautheim, Salm-Reifferscheidt-Raitz and Salm-Reifferscheid-Dyck (extinct in 1888).

=== Upper Salm ===
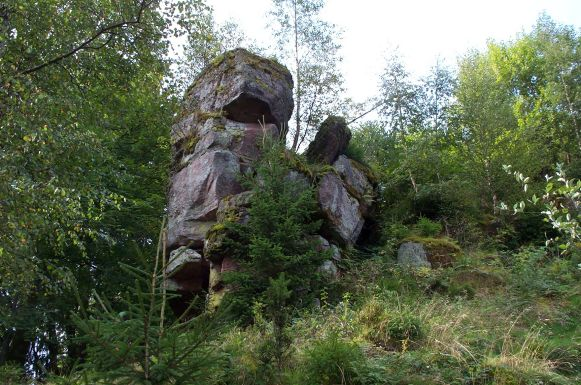
Ruins of Château de Salm

The Counts of Upper Salm resided at Château de Salm in Alsace, where they had to compete with the neighbouring Prince-Bishops of Strasbourg and the Dukes of Lorraine. In 1475, half of the estates were inherited by the Rhinegraves; the remaining half passed to the Lorraine dukes in 1600.

The Rhinegraves began to call themselves Counts of Salm too, they were raised to princes in 1623. Their line included several cadet branches ruling over minor principalities such as Salm-Salm, Salm-Horstmar, and Salm-Kyrburg. In the German Mediatisation of 1803, the Princes of Salm-Salm and Salm-Kyrburg received the southwestern estates of the former Prince-Bishopric of Münster with the Lordship of Anholt. They ruled the newly established Principality of Salm jointly as a condominium.

== Notable members ==
Among its notable members were the counts of Lower Salm in the Ardennes, advocati of the abbaye Saint-Pierre at Senones, counts of Upper Salm in the Vosges mountains, governors of Nancy, marshals of Lorraine, marshals of Bar, princes of the Holy Roman Empire and sovereign princes of the Principality of Salm-Salm:

- Hermann of Salm (c. 1035–1088), German anti-king
- Otto I, Count of Salm (c. 1080–1150), Count Palatine of the Rhine
- Nicholas, Count of Salm (1459–1530), defender of Vienna against the Turks in 1529
- Christina of Salm (1575–1627), duchess consort of Lorraine
- Otto Louis of Salm-Kyrburg-Mörchingen (1597–1634), Swedish general during the Thirty Years' War
- Charles Theodore, Prince of Salm (1645–1710), Imperial field marshal and ministern father in law of the 1st Duke of Ursel.
- Philip Joseph, Prince of Salm-Kyrburg (1709–1779)
  - Frederick III, Prince of Salm-Kyrburg (1744–1794), son
    - Frederick IV, Prince of Salm-Kyrburg (1789–1859), grandson
  - Amalie Zephyrine of Salm-Kyrburg (1760–1841), daughter
- Joseph zu Salm-Reifferscheidt-Dyck (1773–1861), botanist
- Felix Salm-Salm (1828–1870), officer in the American Civil War
  - Agnes Salm-Salm, née Leclerc Joy (1844–1912), his wife
- Princess Maria Christina of Salm-Salm (1879–1962), Archduchess of Austria
- Ludwig von Salm-Hoogstraeten (1885–1944), tennis player

== See also ==
- Salm (state)
- Palais de la Légion d'Honneur
