= Princess Amalie Zephyrine of Salm-Kyrburg =

Amalie Zephyrine
- Princess of Hohenzollern-Sigmaringen
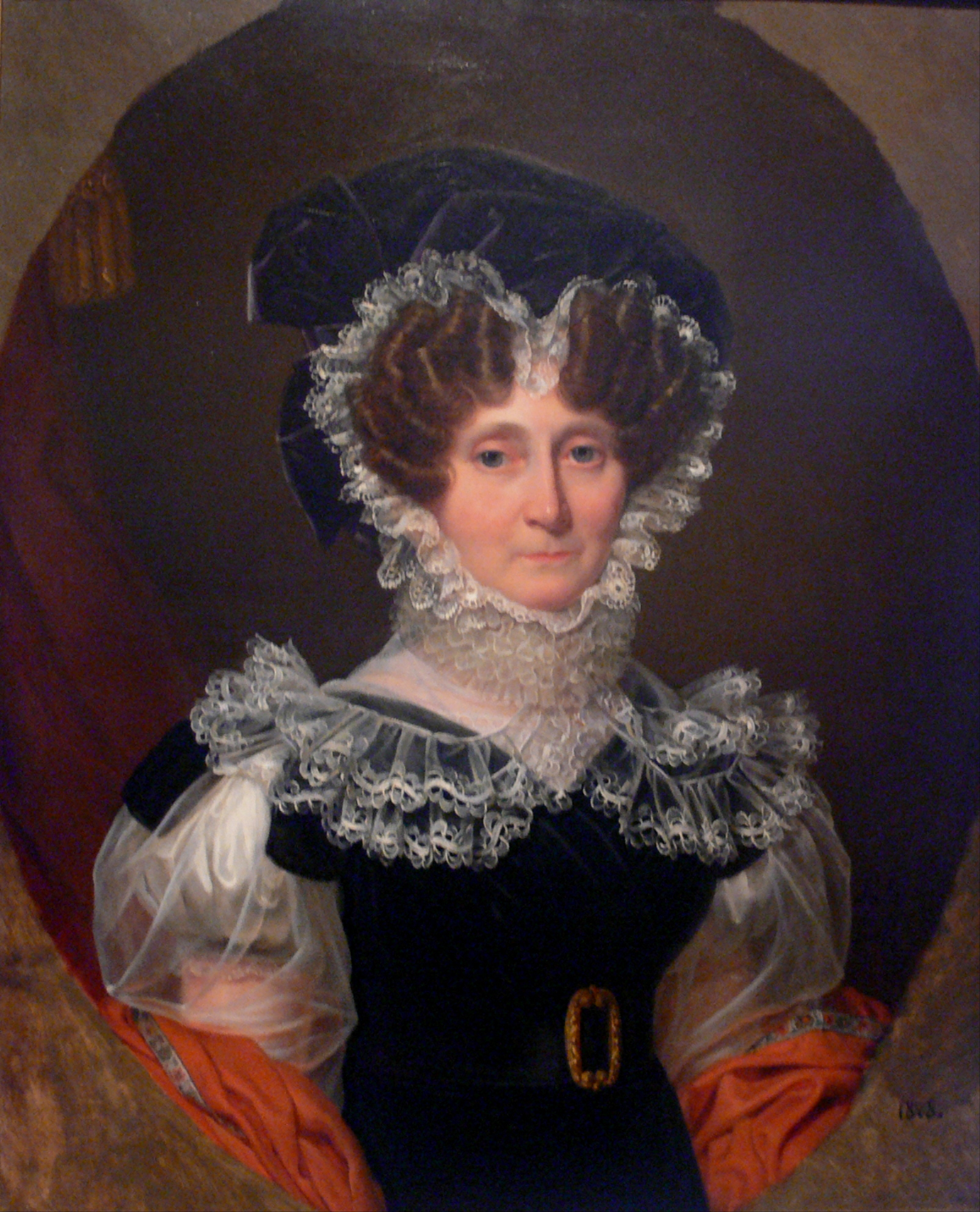
- Portrait by Auguste François Laby, 1828
- Born: 6 March 1760; Paris
- Died: 17 October 1841 (aged 81); Sigmaringen, Principality of Hohenzollern-Sigmaringen
- Spouse: Anton Aloys, Prince of Hohenzollern-Sigmaringen (m. 1782; died 1831)
- Issue: Karl, Prince of Hohenzollern-Sigmaringen
- House: Salm (by birth); Hohenzollern-Sigmaringen (by marriage)
- Father: Philip Joseph, Prince of Salm-Kyrburg
- Mother: Maria Thérèse of Hornes

Amalie Zephyrine of Salm-Kyrburg (French: Amélie Zéphyrine de Salm-Kyrbourg; Paris, 6 March 1760 – Sigmaringen, 17 October 1841), was a German noblewoman by birth member of the House of Salm in the Salm-Kyrburg branch and through her marriage she was Princess of Hohenzollern-Sigmaringen.

Amalie was the daughter of Philip Joseph of Salm-Kyburg, first Prince of Salm-Kyburg, and his wife, Maria Theresa of Hornes, heiress to her father, Maximilian of Hornes. Amalie had nine siblings, including Frederick III, Prince of Salm-Kyrburg.

In 1782, she married Anton Aloys, Prince of Hohenzollern-Sigmaringen, and they had one surviving child, Karl, who would go on to succeed his father as Prince of Hohenzollern-Sigmaringen. Amalie spent little time in Sigmaringen, and she eventually became the lover of Alexandre de Beauharnais, a French revolutionary who was later executed during the September Massacres, and whose widow, Joséphine, later married Napoleon I. Amalie kept good relations with Empress Joséphine and many other influential figures, such as Charles Maurice de Talleyrand-Périgord.

After the death of her eldest brother, she and her younger brother Maurice became legal guardians to her nephew, Frederick IV, Prince of Salm-Kyrburg.

== Life ==
The eighth child and fifth (but third surviving) daughter of Prince Philip Joseph of Salm-Kyrburg (2nd Prince of Salm-Kyrburg) born from his marriage with his step-niece Princess Marie Thérèse de Hornes (1725-1783), eldest daughter and heiress of Maximilian, Prince of Hornes, Amalie Zephyrine was born and raised in Paris, although the family seat of the Salm-Kyrburg family was Kirn, which today is part of the German state of Rhineland-Palatinate. She was baptised at the Church of Saint-Sulpice.

She had was very close to her older brother Frederick III, 3rd Prince of Salm-Kyrburg, who commissioned to the Parisian architect Jacques Denis Antoine the construction of a baroque summer residence for Amalie Zephyrine below the family seat of the family in Kirn. The residence was named Schloss Amalienlust in her honor, but was not fully completed during her lifetime. Residence, which was very modern and comfortable according to the ideas of the time, is, like the house not far from it, one which Frederick III had built for himself and his wife Princess Johanna Franziska of Hohenzollern-Sigmaringen, preserved largely true to the original. Sophisticated demands were satisfied by a theater that completed the Kirner Ensemble.

=== Marriage ===
Following her parents' request, on 29 November 1781 in Strasbourg, on the occasion of the marriage of Frederick III with Johanna Franziska, announcing the betrothal of Amalie Zephyrine with the Erbprinz Anton Aloys Meinrad Franz, heir of the Principality of Hohenzollern-Sigmaringen and brother of her sister-in-law; the wedding took place on the Piaristenkloster Kirn on 13 August 1782, with the formal reception being celebrated in the Schloss Dhaun, five kilometers away. The newlyweds spent their first winter together in Paris, where on 3 September 1783 Amalie Zephyrine gave birth to her first child, a stillborn son.

In 1784, Amalie Zephyrine came to Sigmaringen for the first time, but found life in the small residential town on the Danube to be "unbearably restrictive". Paris was already a big city at the end of the 18th century, while Sigmaringen had barely 1000 inhabitants. One year later, on 20 February 1785, Amalie Zephyrine gave birth a second son, Karl Anton Frederick Meinrad Fidelis, but ten weeks later she fled disguised as a man from Sigmaringen to Kirn at the side of her brother Frederick III and his wife Johanna Franziska. She left her son behind.

=== Separation ===
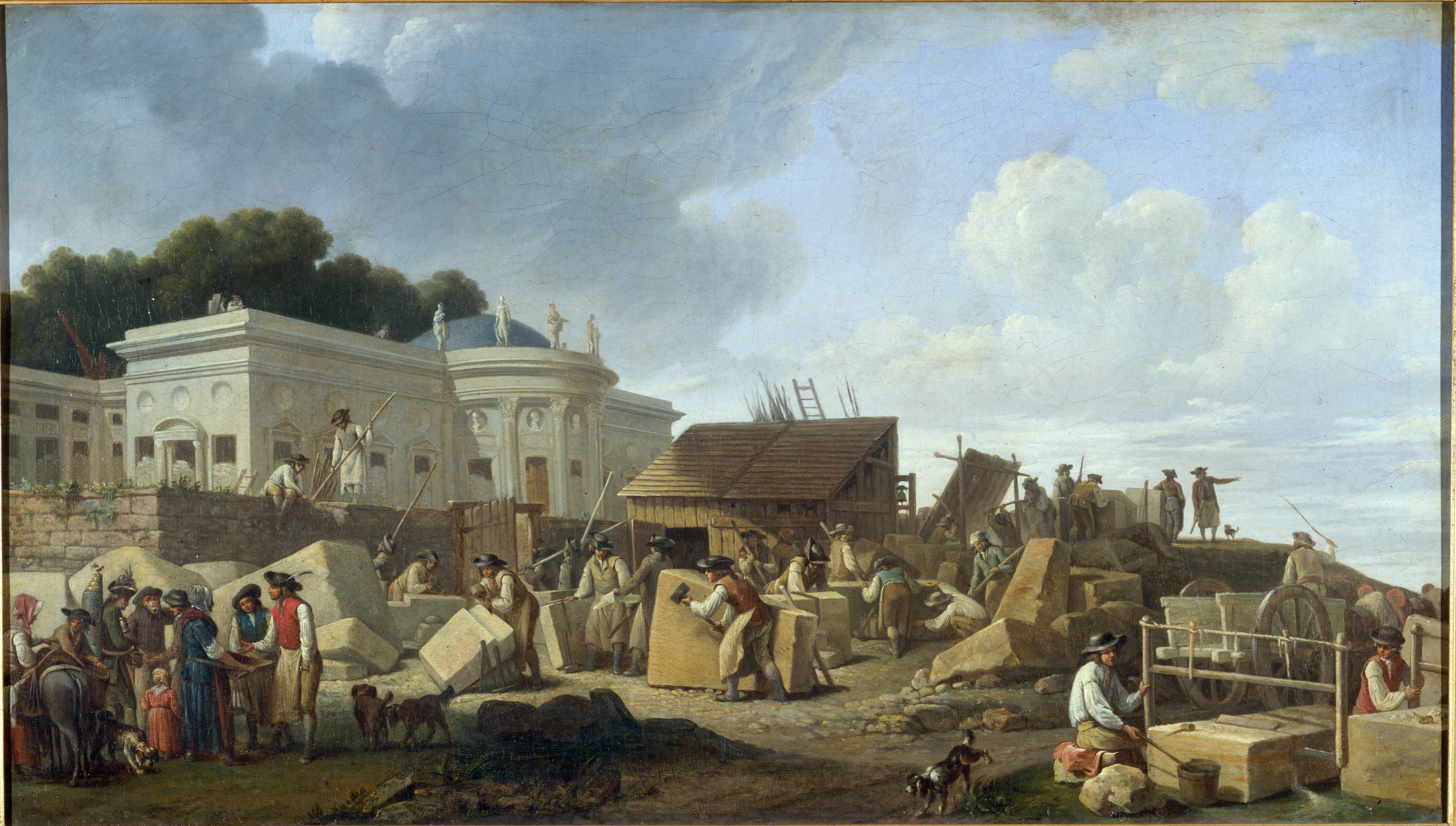
The construction of the Hôtel de Salm. Musée Carnavalet, Paris.

Shortly after, Amalie Zephyrine also left Kirn and returned to her native Paris, where her brother Frederick III had commissioned an aristocratic palace as a residence for the Salm-Kyrburg family by the architect Pierre Rousseau from 1782 to 1787; the residence, named the Hôtel de Salm (located on the Rue de Lille next to the Quai d'Orsay) soon became the gathering place for the aristocratic upper class of pre-revolutionary France, with Amalie Zephyrine as hostess –eventually, the Hôtel was seized by the Revolutionary government and is today the Palais de la Légion d'Honneur being remodeled for that purpose by Antoine-François Peyre in 1804–. On 20 December 1785, Amalie Zephyrine's father-in-law Charles Frederick, Prince of Hohenzollern-Sigmaringen died, and her husband became the new ruling Prince, and she became the Princess consort, but she refused to return to Sigmaringen. Five years later, on 23 August 1790, her sister-in-law Johanna Franziska, Princess consort of Salm-Kyrburg, also died; from her marriage with Frederick III, she had four children, one daughter and three sons, but only the youngest of the sons, Frederik Ernst Otto Philip Anton Furnibert (born 14 December 1789), survive infancy and became in the Erbprinz of Salm-Kyrburg as heir of his father.

=== French revolution ===
By that time, the French Revolution had taken its course, and Amalie Zephyrine, her brother Frederick III and her lover Alexandre de Beauharnais fought on the side of the revolution. However, in March 1794 both men were imprisoned in the Carmes Prison during the Reign of Terror after being accused of being "still attached to the Ancien Régime" and guillotined on 23 July. Amalie Zephyrine herself managed to survived the Reign of Terror, but the death of her brother devastated her, according to her correspondence. She used her connections to find out the location of the graves, which had been kept hidden from the French public, and in 1797 secretly purchased that land on Rue de Picpus and had it opened up to the rest of the garden, which is today called the Picpus Cemetery. Nevertheless, Amalie Zephyrine managed to kept good relations with a number of influential figures of the Revolution, including Charles Maurice de Talleyrand-Périgord and Joséphine de Beauharnais, the widow of her former lover, who had married Napoléon Bonaparte in 1796. Because her nephew and Prince Frederick IV of Salm-Kyrburg was still a minor, Amalie Zephyrine and her younger brother Maurice acted as guardians and regents for the Principality of Salm-Kyrburg from 1794 until 14 December 1810, when Frederick IV attained his age of legal majority.

Helene d'Isque (later renamed von Schatzberg; died 1861), was born in 1799 and lived in Amalie Zephyrine's household from August 1800 to January 1824, the year she married Friedrich von Laßberg. From the beginning, the protection that the princess gave to the girl gave rise to rumours; recent research suggests that in fact, Helene was Amalie Zephyrine's illegitimate daughter, born from her extramarital relationship with the French Colonel Charles de Voumard (who later called himself Karl Heinrich Voumard von Wehrburg; born 1761 – died 1841), who had been appointed by the princess in 1797 as tutor of her eight-year-old orphaned nephew Prince Frederick IV of Salm-Kyrburg.

=== Reign of Napoleon ===
From the Second Congress of Rastatt in 1799 to the Rhine Confederation Act in 1806, Amalie Zephyrine used her relationships with the Napoleonic court to work in favor of her son Karl for the preservation of the Principality of Hohenzollern-Sigmaringen and its full sovereignty. At the end, she was able to avert the imminent Mediatisation of both the Houses of Hohenzollern-Sigmaringen and Hohenzollern-Hechingen in favor of the Kingdom of Württemberg or the Grand Duchy of Baden; for this, she is considered as the "savior" of the Hohenzollerns. At the same time, Amalie Zephyrine campaigned for the newly created Principality of Salm and represented the interest of its designated princes, her underage nephew Frederick IV of Salm-Kyrburg (of whom she was guardian and regent) and Konstantin of Salm-Salm.

In 1806, for political reasons, Amalie Zephyrine arranged the betrothal of her son Karl, Erbprinz of Hohenzollern-Sigmaringen, with Antoinette Murat, the orphaned niece and ward of Joachim Murat, who was married to Napoleon Bonaparte's youngest sister Caroline and who rose to become Grand Duke of Berg and King of Naples. The marriage was concluded secularly in the Hôtel de Breteuil in Paris on 3 February 1808 and ecclesiastically the next day.

=== Later life ===
In 1808, after more than 20 eventful years in Paris, Amalie Zephyrine finally returned to Sigmaringen. At first, she lived with her son and daughter-in-law from July 1808 in the Schloss Krauchenwies. In nearby former Inzigkofen Priory they settled down in the royal household from 1810, after the secularized monastery was transformed into a country palace. In 1811 she finally left Krauchenwies to live in Inzigkofen. Towards the Danube, she left a remarkable English-style landscape park that still exists until today. In the park, she had a monument erected to her beloved brother Frederick III. Until her death, she lived in what is now known as the Alten Prinzenbau (Old Prince's Palace) in Sigmaringen, which her husband Prince Anton Aloys had built especially for her between 1822 and 1825. Inzigkofen served her and her grandson Karl Anton as a summer residence.

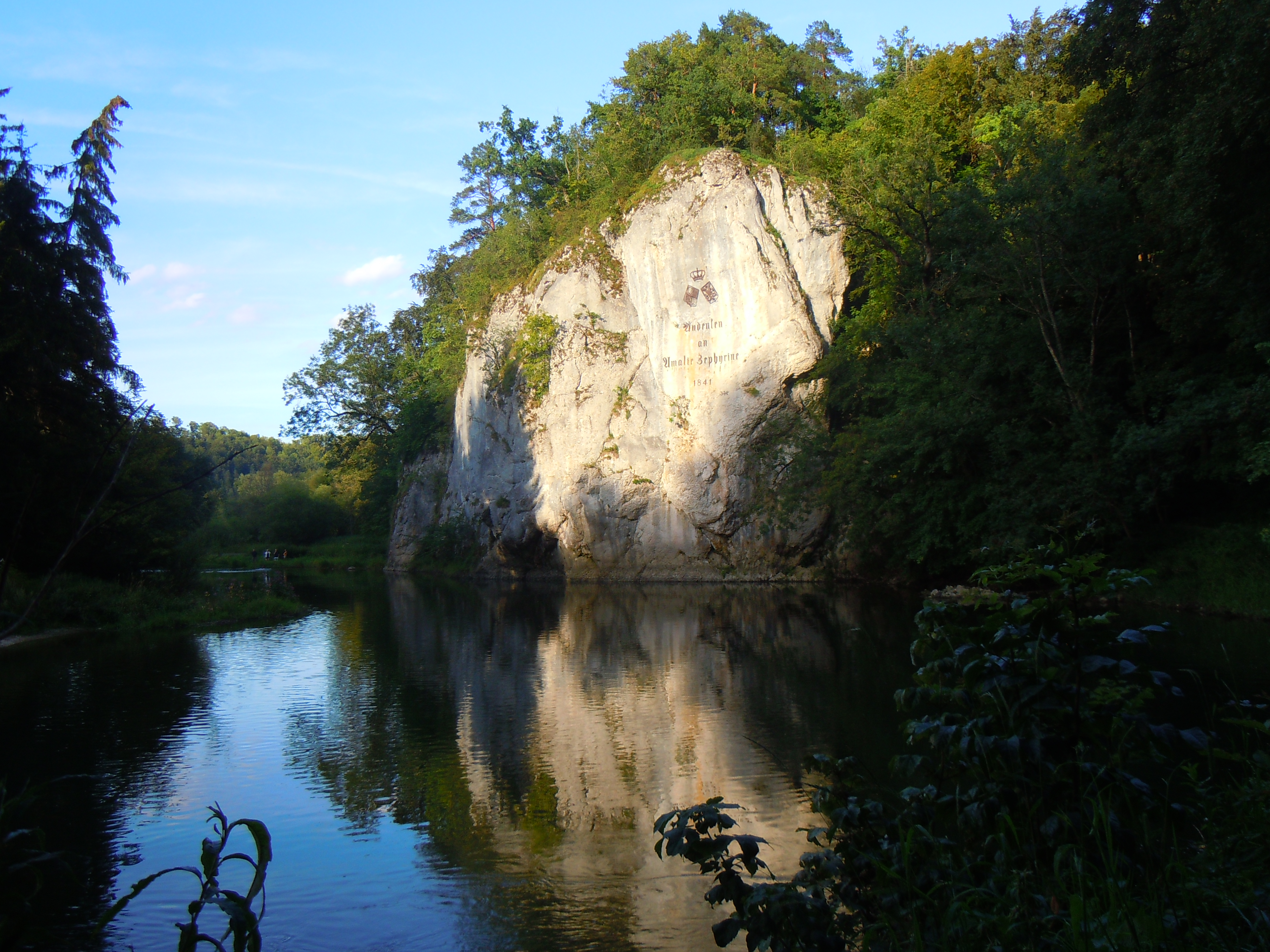
The "Amalienfels" on the Danube.

Although Amalie Zephyrine's husband was still alive and they remained married, they lived amicably apart for the remainder of their lives: in the House of Hohenzollern, unlike other German aristocratic houses, there was never a discussion about a possible divorce; however, Prince Anton Aloys visited her regularly and corresponded with her on friendly terms. He also always paid for her bills.

On 17 October 1831, Prince Anton Aloys died and his son succeeded him as the new Prince of Hohenzollern-Sigmaringen. Amalie Zephyrine survive him by exactly ten years, dying on 17 October 1841 at the age of 81. Her son had a cliff on the banks of the Danube in Sigmaringen named the "Amalienfels" in her honor. Her name and the combined family coat of arms of the Houses of Salm-Kyrburg and Hohenzollern-Sigmaringen are carved into the rock.

Her great-great-grandson was Albert I, King of the Belgians from 1909 to 1934. Another great-grandson, Prince Karl of Hohenzollern-Sigmaringen, was crowned King of Romania in 1866 as Carol I.

== Ancestry ==
Ancestors of Princess Amalie Zephyrine of Salm-Kyrburg

16. Wild- and Rhinegrave Friedrich I Magnus of Dhaun-Neuviller
8. Count Karl Florentin of Salm-Neuweiler
17. Marguerite Thésart des Essars
4. Count Heinrich Gabriel Joseph of Salm-Kyrburg
18. Count Albert François de Lalaing-Hoogstraten
9. Countess Marie Gabrielle of Lalaing
19. Princess Isabelle of Ligne
2. Philip Joseph, Prince of Salm-Kyrburg
20. Count Eustache de Croÿ-Rœulx,
10. Count Philippe François de Croÿ, Marquess of Warnecq
21. Theodora Gertrude Marie von Kettler
5. Princess Maria Theresia of Croÿ
22. Baron Jacques Ferdinand de La Pierre-Bousies
11. Claudine de La Pierre
23. Marie Thérèse Deschamps de Kesseler, Lady of Lipeloo
1. Amalie Zephyrine of Salm-Kyrburg
24. Eugene Maximilian, Prince of Hornes
12. Philippe Emanuel, Prince of Hornes
25. Countess Jeanne Anne de Croÿ-Solre,
6. Maximilien Emanuel, Prince of Hornes
26. Henri Louis, Prince of Ligne
13. Princess Marie Anne Ligne
27. Juana Francisca Folch de Cardona
3. Princess Maria Theresa Hornes
28. Robert Bruce, 2d Earl of Elgin
14. Thomas Bruce, 3rd Earl of Elgin
29. Lady Diana Grey
7. Lady Marie Bruce, Baroness de Melsbroeck
30. Louis Conrad d'Argenteau-Esneux
15. Charlotte Jacqueline d'Argenteau
31. Gisberte Jeanne de Locquenghien

== Bibliography ==
- (in German) Bumiller, Casimir: Von Napoleons Gnaden - Die Fürstinnen von Hohenzollern-Sigmaringen und von Fürstenberg wollten 1806 die Souveränität ihrer Herrschaften erhalten, in: Momente, Beiträge zur Landeskunde von Baden-Württemberg, 3/2006 ISSN 1619-1609
- (in German) Haug, Gunter: Die Schicksalsfürstin. Amalie Zephyrine, die Retterin von Hohenzollern, 2005 ISBN 3-87181-025-8 (narrated story)
- (in German) Loges, Gabriele: Paris, Sigmaringen oder Die Freiheit der Amalie Zephyrine von Hohenzollern, Klöpfer & Meyer, Tübingen 2013, ISBN 978-3-86351-069-5 (novel)
- (in German) Histoire de la vie de la Princesse Amélie Zéphyrine de Hohenzollern-Sigmaringen, née Princesse de Salm-Kyrburg, ma mère, écrite par elle-même, reçue après sa mort / Lebensgeschichte der Fürstin Amalie Zephyrine von Hohenzollern-Sigmaringen, geborene Prinzessin von Salm-Kyrburg, meiner Mutter, von ihr eigenhändig verfasst, nach ihrem Tod erhalten, 1760–1831. Edited by Christina Egli and Edwin Ernst Weber, Ed. Isele, Eggingen 2015, ISBN 978-3-86142-596-0
