= Musée de la Légion d'honneur =

Museum in Paris, France

Coordinates: 48°51′38″N 2°19′28″E

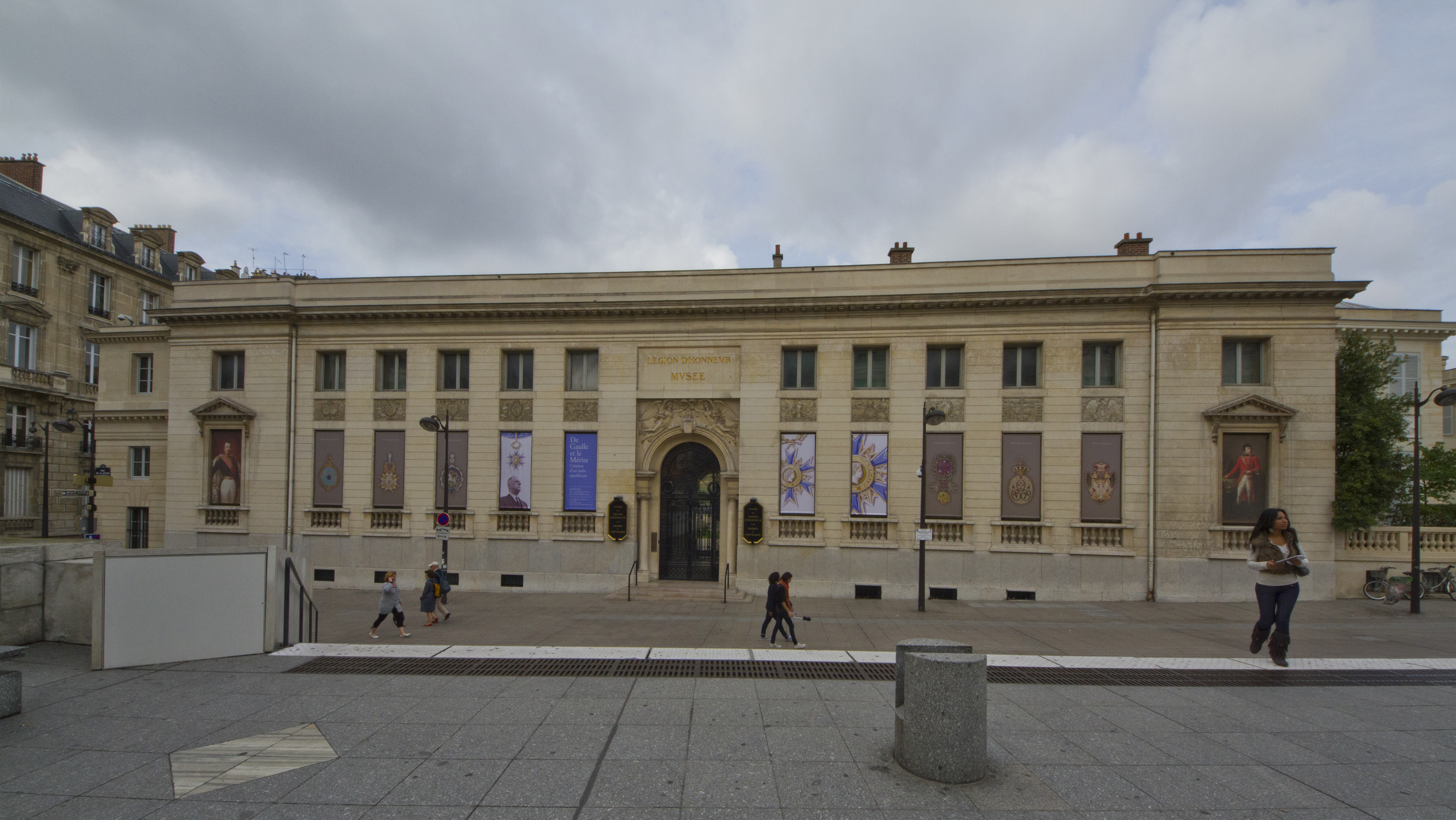
The museum building in 2013

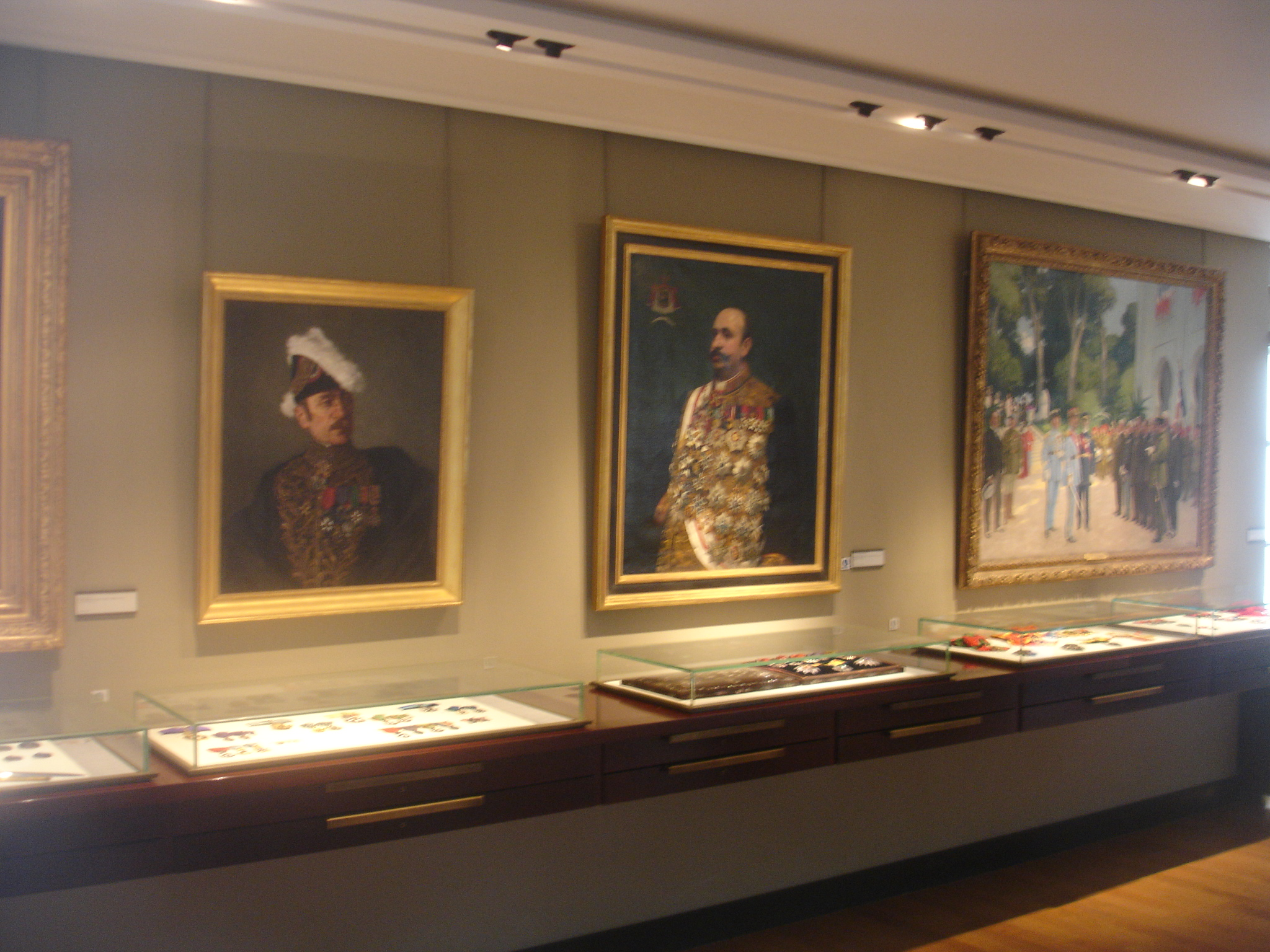
Interior of the museum

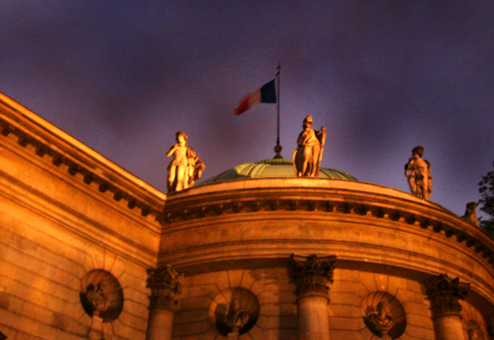
The museum building at night

The Musée national de la Légion d'honneur et des ordres de chevalerie (French pronunciation: [myze nɑsjɔnal də la leʒjɔ̃ dɔnœʁ e dez‿ɔʁdʁ də ʃəvalʁi]; transl. "National museum of the Legion of Honour and of orders of chivalry") is a French national museum of orders of merit and orders of chivalry. It is located in the Palais de la Légion d'Honneur beside the Musée d'Orsay at 2, rue de la Légion-d'Honneur, in the 7th arrondissement of Paris, France. It is open daily except Monday and Tuesday; admission is free. The nearest métro and RER stations are Musée d'Orsay, Solférino, and Assemblée Nationale.

== History ==
The museum is housed within the Hôtel de Salm, built in 1782 by architect Pierre Rousseau for Frederick III, Prince of Salm-Kyrburg. The building burned in 1871 during the Paris Commune, and it subsequently was restored by a subscription of medallists. Since 1804, this building has been called the Palais de la Légion d'Honneur, and it is the seat of France's highest honours: the Légion d'honneur (1802), the Médaille militaire (1852), and the Ordre national du Mérite (1963).

Today's museum was created in 1925. It displays a history of France's honours, medals, decorations, and chivalric orders from the time of King Louis XI to the present, including Napoleonic souvenirs and more than 300 portraits. A special section is dedicated to foreign orders. Its library and archives contain more than 3,000 works.

== See also ==
- List of museums in Paris
- Military awards and decorations of France
