= Elting =

Elting is a surname. Notable people with the surname include:

- Elizabeth Elting (born 1966), American businesswoman, entrepreneur, and philanthropist
- Josef Elting (born 1944), German footballer
- William Elting Johnson (1837–1912), American physician and politician
