= Lordship of Anholt =

German polity

Lordship of Anholt Herrschaft Anholt (German)
- 1169–1802
- Coat of arms
- Status: Lordship
- Capital: Anholt
- Common languages: Low Rhenish
- Historical era: Middle Ages
  - First mentioned: 1169
  - gained Reichsfreiheit: 14th century
  - To Lords of Gemen: 1372
  - To Lords of Bronckhorst: 1402
  - Inherited by Salm: 1641
  - Incorporated into Salm: 1802
Preceded by	Succeeded by
Prince-Bishopric of Utrecht	Principality of Salm

The Lordship of Anholt was a small state of the Holy Roman Empire. It was an imperial estate and a member of the Lower Rhenish-Westphalian Circle.

== Geography ==
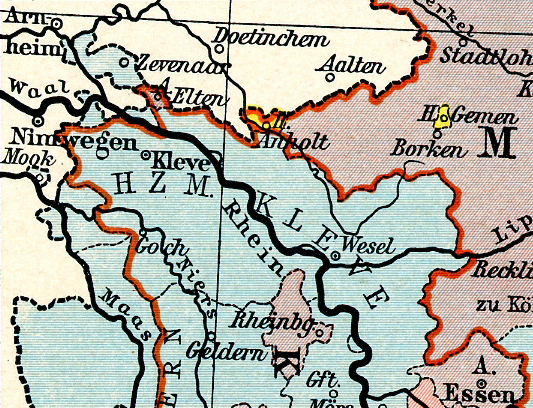
Map as in 1789, with Anholt in upper centre

The state consisted only of the City of Anholt in the present-day District of Borken in the German state of North Rhine Westphalia. It had received town privileges in 1347 and finally was incorporated into the City of Isselburg in 1975. The Lordship bordered three larger states: the Duchy of Guelders, the Bishopric of Münster, and the Duchy of Cleves.

== History ==
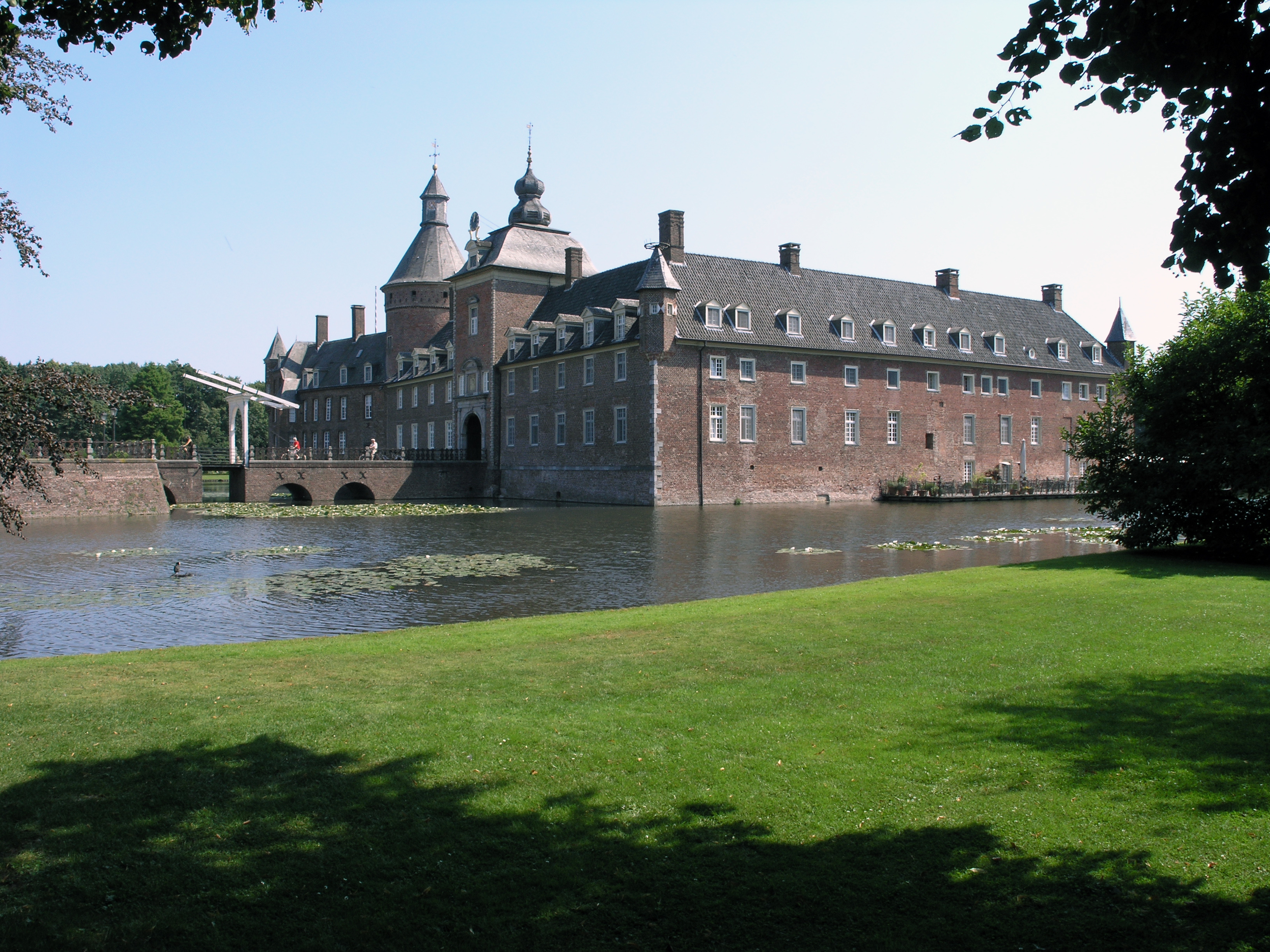
Anholt Castle

The Lords of Anholt, originally liegemen of the Utrecht bishops, reached independence as Freiherren by the early 14th century. In 1402, their territory fell to the Lords of Bronckhorst through marriage. These acquired a comital title and in 1431 had Anholt recognized by King Sigismund of Luxembourg as an imperial estate with a seat in the Reichstag.

In 1512 the forces of Guelders under Duke Charles of Egmond occupied Anholt, as the Bronckhorst counts had sided with his rival Philip I of Castile, and could not be induced to release it until in 1537 they were paid a significant ransom. The counts stayed loyal to the House of Habsburg, therefore their lordship had to suffer in the Eighty Years' War, when it was attacked by the Geuzen of the Utrecht Union, as well as in the Thirty Years' War.

In 1641, again by marriage, Anholt was acquired by the princes of Salm, and passed to the Salm-Salm division of Salm. When Salm-Salm was annexed by France in 1793, Anholt became the seat and main possession of the princes of Salm-Salm. In 1802, the princes of Salm-Salm, together with their relatives, the princes of Salm-Kyrburg, received the newly created Principality of Salm as a compensation for their losses from the Empire; this much larger new Principality was adjacent to Anholt and eventually incorporated it.
