= Philip Joseph, Prince of Salm-Kyrburg =

Philip Joseph
- Prince of Salm-Kyrburg
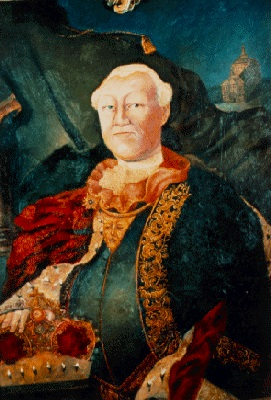
- Portrait of the Prince (18th Century)
- Tenure: 16 October 1716-7 June 1779
- Predecessor: Hendrik Gabriel Joseph
- Successor: Frederick III
- Born: 21 July 1709
- Died: 7 June 1779 (aged 69)
- Noble family: House of Salm
- Spouse: Princess Maria Theresa van Hornes
- Father: Hendrik Gabriel Joseph of Salm-Kyrburg
- Mother: Princess Maria Theresia de Croÿ

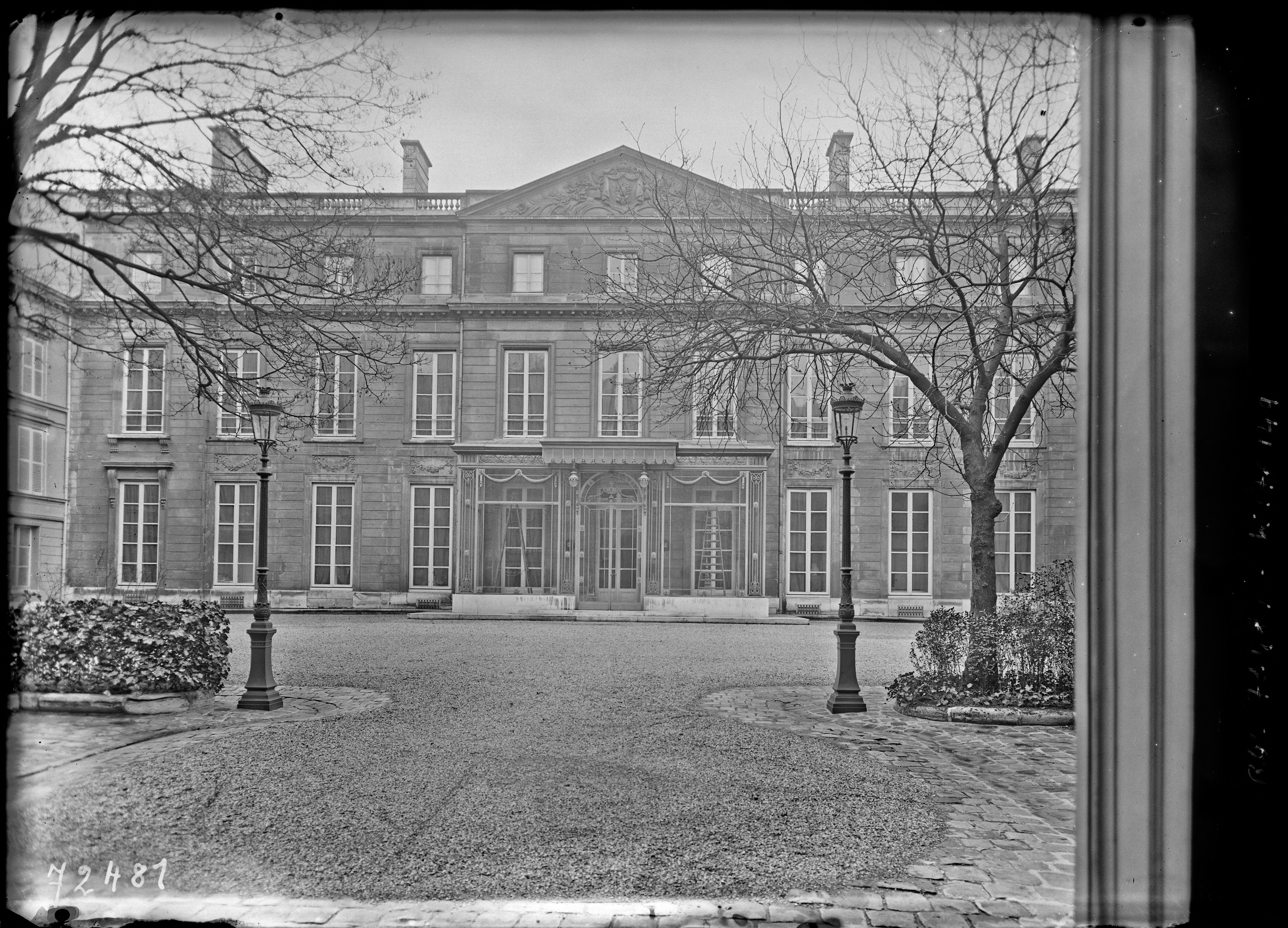
Hôtel de Broglie - Rue de Varennes 73 Paris VII.

Philip Joseph, Prince of Salm-Kyrburg (1709–1779) was the first prince of Salm-Kyrburg, from 1743 to 1779.

== Life and reign ==
Philip Joseph was the second son of Hendrik Gabriel Joseph of Salm-Kyrburg (1674–1716), regent of Salm-Kyrburg from 1696 to 1716, and his wife Princess Maria Theresia de Croÿ (1678–1713), daughter of Philippe François Albert de Croÿ, marquis de Warneck (1645–1710). His paternal grandfather was general Karl Florentin zu Salm (1638–1676). He had an elder brother, Johann Dominik of Salm-Kyrburg (1708–1778), and a sister, Henriëtte (who married Maximilian, Prince van Hornes (1695–1763), who already had two daughters from a previous marriage, the eldest of whom later married Philip Joseph).

The Salm-Mörchingen family lost the titles of "Wildgrave of Dhaun" and "Rhinegrave of Stein" in 1681, when they lacked a male successor. Salm-Kyrburg was from then on run by regents on their behalf. Philip Joseph reigned with his brother John from 1716. When Salm-Kyrburg again arose, this time as a principality, Philip Joseph became its first prince.

== Marriage and issue ==
He married in 1742 to Princess Maria Theresa van Hornes (1725-1783), who was made her father's sole heir in 1763, with his titles and country estates thus passing to the princes of Salm-Kyrburg. Emanuel's other daughter, Princess Elisabeth of Hornes, widow of Gustaaf Adolf, Prince of Stolberg-Gedern and mother of Charles Edward Stuart's wife Louise, agreed to this without protest.

Philip Joseph and Maria Theresa had 10 children, including a pair of twins:

- Marie Maximiliane Louise (1744–1790), married Jean Bretagne Charles de La Trémoille (1737–1792), duc de Thouars
- Frederick (1744–1794), later 2nd prince of Salm-Kyrburg
- Auguste Friederike (1747–1822), married Duke Anne Emmanuel de Croÿ (1743–1803).
- Charles Augustus (1750)
- Marie Louise (born 1753, date of death unknown)
- Louis Joseph Ferdinand (1753–1774)
- Elisabeth Claudine (1756–1757)
- Amalie Zephyrine (1760–1841), married Anton Aloys, Prince of Hohenzollern-Sigmaringen (1762–1831).
- Charles Albert Henry (1761)
- Maurice Gustav Adolf (1761–1813), married Countess Christiane von Wartenberg
