= Spork (locality) =

- Ortsteil of Bocholt
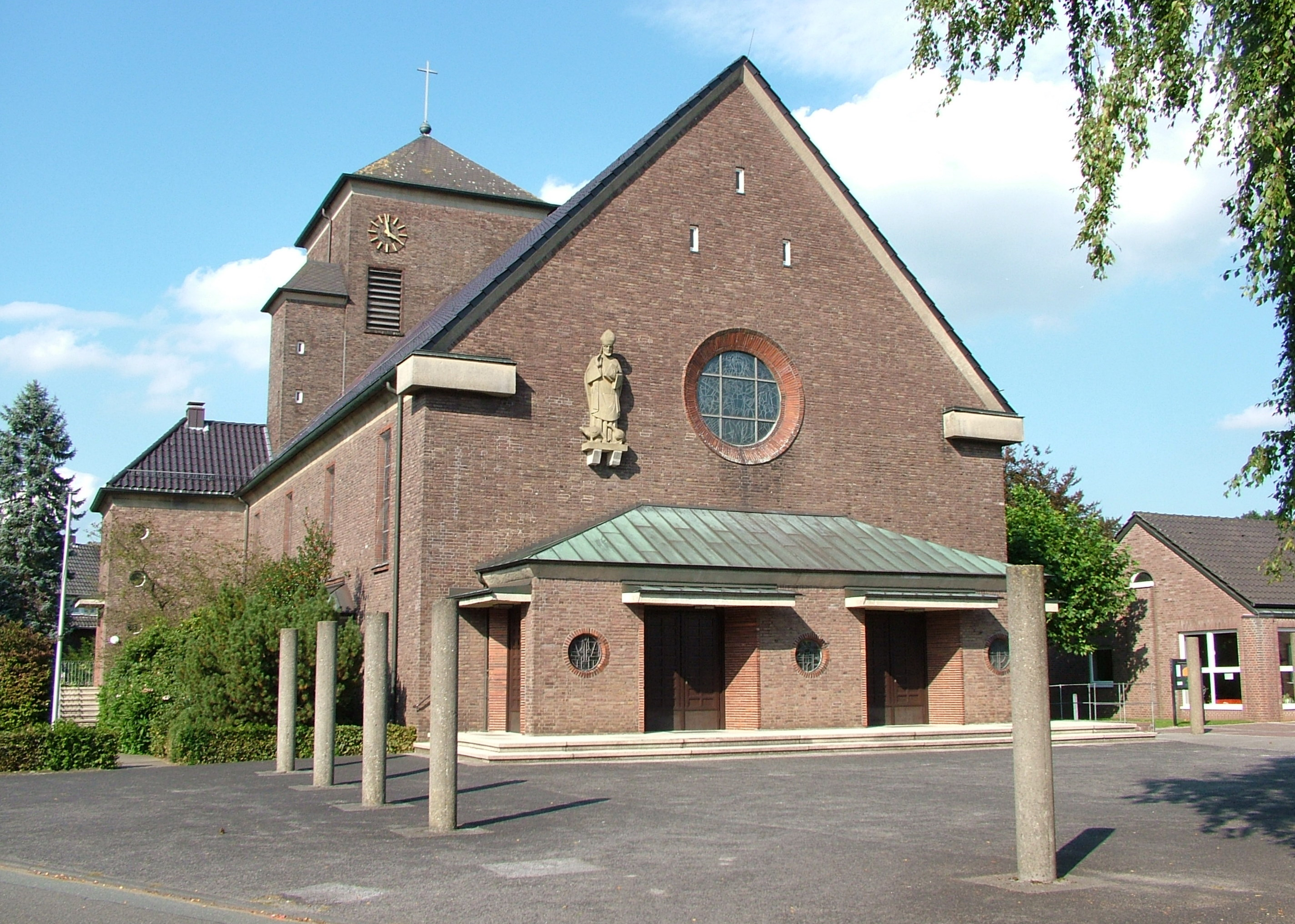
- Interactive map of Spork
- Location within Germany Location within North Rhine-Westphalia
- Coordinates: 51°51′47″N 6°33′29″E
- Country: Germany
- State: North Rhine-Westphalia
- Admin. region: Münster
- District: Borken
- City: Bocholt

Population (2017-12-31)
  - Total: 972
- Time zone: UTC+01:00 (CET)
  - Summer (DST): UTC+02:00 (CEST)

Spork is a locality (German: Ortsteil) of the town of Bocholt in the district of Borken. It was first mentioned in 1188 as Sporklo. Formerly an independent municipality, it was merged into the city of Bocholt in 1975. Its population was 972 in December 2017.
