= Frederick IV of Salm-Kyrburg =

Frederick IV, Prince of Salm-Kyrburg (Frederik Ernst Otto Philip Anton Furnibert; Paris, 14 December 1789 – Brussels, 14 August 1859) was the prince of Salm-Kyrburg, Ahaus and Bocholt from 1794 to 1813. He was the son and successor of Frederick III and his wife, Princess Johanna Franziska of Hohenzollern-Sigmaringen. He initially had two elder brothers and one younger sister, but all three of these died young.

== Life and reign ==
His mother died in 1790 at the Schloss Kirn, and his father was guillotined in Paris on 25 July 1794. During his minority, his guardian was his aunt, Amalie Zephyrine. On 11 January 1815, he married Cécile Rosalie Prévôt, baroness of Bordeaux (1783–1866). Their only child was Frederick Ernst Joseph Augustus (1823–1887).

In 1801, the principality was removed from the Holy Roman Empire at the peace of Lunéville, and in 1806 (with Amalie signing as Frederick's guardian and regent), it became a founding member of the Confederation of the Rhine, gaining protection from Napoleon and effectively freedom of action for itself (albeit as a French satellite).

In compensation for the loss of the Salm-Kyburg principality on the left bank of the Rhine, the 1803 German Mediatisation granted Salm-Kyburg lordship over a third of a part of the secularised lands of the prince bishops of Munster that had previous belonged to the amts of Bocholt and Ahaus to compensate for his loss in 1801. The other two-thirds were granted to Konstantin Alexander Joseph zu Salm-Salm in compensation for his lost lands on the Rhine. The princes of Salm-Salm and Salm-Kyrburg reigned over these aforementioned lands as a joint principality, the Principality of Salm.

On 13 December 1811, Frederick IV and Konstantin Alexander lost Salm entirely to France, which annexed it outright, and then two years later it was annexed to Prussia by the Congress of Vienna, thus ending the principality of Salm-Kyburg. Frederick IV's descendants, however, retained their titles and the other family territories.
