= Josef Elting =

German footballer

Personal information
- Date of birth: 29 December 1944 (age 81)
- Place of birth: Bocholt, Germany
- Height: 1.80 m (5 ft 11 in)
- Position: Goalkeeper

Senior career*
Years	Team	Apps	(Gls)
1965–1970	Schalke 04	52	(0)
1970–1974	1. FC Kaiserslautern	87	(0)
1974–1976	Real Murcia	36	(0)
1976–1977	Wuppertaler SV	16	(0)
1977–1980	1. FC Bocholt		
- * Club domestic league appearances and goals

Josef Elting (born 29 December 1944) is a German former professional footballer who played as a goalkeeper for Schalke 04, 1. FC Kaiserslautern, Real Murcia, Wuppertaler SV and 1. FC Bocholt.
