= Bocholt, Germany =

Bocholt
- Town
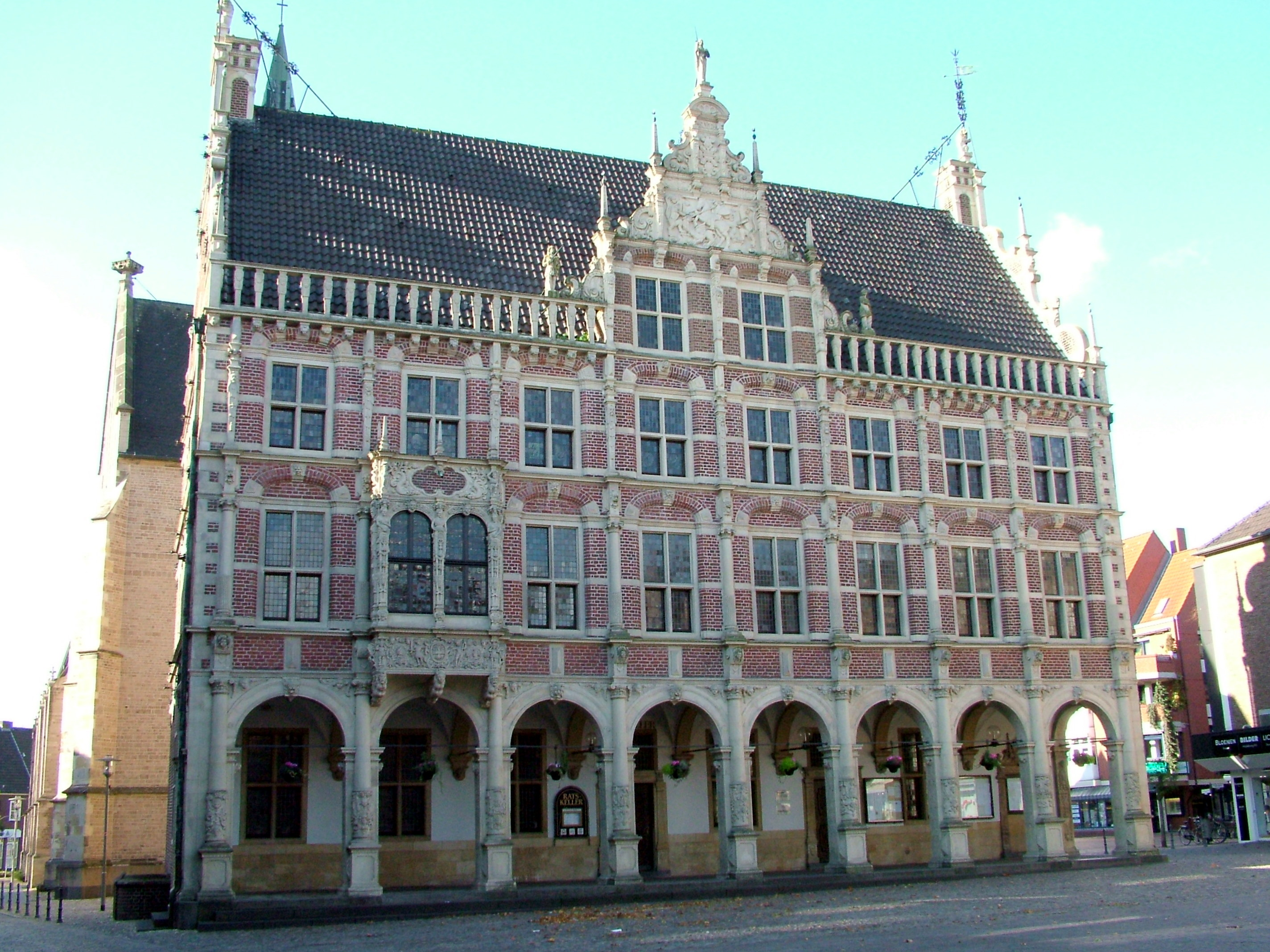
- Old Town hall

- Flag Coat of arms

- Location of Bocholt within Borken district
- Interactive map of Bocholt
- Location within Germany Location within North Rhine-Westphalia
- Coordinates: 51°50′N 6°37′E
- Country: Germany
- State: North Rhine-Westphalia
- Admin. region: Münster
- District: Borken
- Subdivisions: 12

Government
  - Mayor (2025–30): Christian Mangen (FDP)

Area
  - Total: 119.4 km^{2} (46.1 sq mi)
- Elevation: 25 m (82 ft)

Population (2025-12-31)
  - Total: 73,048
  - Density: 611.8/km^{2} (1,585/sq mi)
- Time zone: UTC+01:00 (CET)
  - Summer (DST): UTC+02:00 (CEST)
- Postal codes: 46395,46397,46399
- Dialling codes: 02871; 02874 (Suderwick)
- Vehicle registration: BOR, AH, BOH
- Website: bocholt.de

Bocholt (German pronunciation: [ˈbɔxɔlt]) is a city in the north-west of North Rhine-Westphalia, Germany, part of the district Borken. It is situated 4 km (2 1/2 miles) south of the border with the Netherlands. Suderwick is part of Bocholt and is situated at the border annex to Dinxperlo.

== Geography ==
The northern border of the city of Bocholt is the German border with the Netherlands. Bocholt borders the district of Wesel, in the administrative region of Düsseldorf, in the southwest.

Bocholt is bordered in the north by the Dutch municipalities of Aalten and Winterswijk, in the east by the city of Rhede, in the south by the city of Hamminkeln, and in the west by the city of Isselburg.

The climate in the region of Bocholt and West Münsterland is temperate with distinct maritime influences, with very mild winters in comparison to other German regions because of the proximity to the ocean and the low elevation. Summers are moderately warm. The average temperature in January is 2.7 °C (37 °F) and in July 18.4 °C (65 °F).

In the average year there are 12 days of snow cover, about 31 sunny days (high temperature of 25 °C; 77 °F or higher) and 6 hot days (30 °C; 86 °F or higher) on average. In the average year there is about 750 mm (30") of precipitation, with June (78 mm; 3") and April (41 mm; 1 1/2") being the driest months.

== History ==
Bocholt was first written about in 779, when Charlemagne won a battle against the Saxons nearby. However the settlement was probably much older. Bishop Dietrich III von Isenburg from Münster gave Bocholt city rights in 1222.

In the 15th century the city flourished. The engraver Israhel van Meckenem lived and worked in the city.

Between 1803 and 1810 Bocholt was the capital of the Principality of Salm. The Principality of Salm was governed by the prince of Salm-Salm and the prince of Salm-Kyrburg.

During the Second World War the city survived generally unscathed until an Allied bombing raid on 22 March 1945 which destroyed most of the city. The city was then captured by the British a week later on 28 March. The city was the site of the Stalag VI-F POW camp.

In 1975 the former municipalities Barlo, Biemenhorst, Hemden, Holtwick, Liedern, Lowick, Mussum, Spork, Stenern and Suderwick were merged into Bocholt.

== Population development ==
Historical population

Year	Pop.	±% p.a.
1871	6,125	—
1880	8,534	+3.75%
1890	13,034	+4.33%
1900	21,278	+5.02%
1910	26,404	+2.18%
1925	30,182	+0.90%
1933	33,441	+1.29%
1939	35,099	+0.81%
1945	29,443	−2.89%
1950	37,674	+5.05%
1961	45,675	+1.77%
1965	61,438	+7.69%

Year	Pop.	±% p.a.
1970	65,141	+1.18%
1975	65,461	+0.10%
1980	65,354	−0.03%
1985	66,107	+0.23%
1990	68,936	+0.84%
1995	70,424	+0.43%
2000	72,138	+0.48%
2005	73,790	+0.45%
2010	73,170	−0.17%
2015	71,443	−0.48%
2020	71,061	−0.11%
2025	73,048	+0.55%

Source: Landesdatabank Nordrhein-Westfalen (1965-2025)

== Economy ==
Bocholt is a manufacturing town. It was centered on the textile industry for most of the 19th and 20th centuries. Today there are still several successful textile manufacturers in town, but the importance of the textile industry has greatly declined. The major employers today in Bocholt are Gigaset (Communications) and Mechanical Drives (formerly Flender) (Siemens) - a leading manufacturer of transmissions, especially for wind energy plants. Most of Bocholt's industries are smaller and manufacture highly specialized products. Some of them are international leaders in their particular fields - A Good example is the bicycle company Rose Bikes. Local industries profit from cooperation with the University of Applied Sciences (Fachhochschule) also located in Bocholt as well as with similar institutions in the region.

Bocholt is also a regional centre for shopping in the West-Münsterland area and draws consumers from the neighbouring rural and small town areas of the Netherlands. The town features an attractive old town shopping area as well as a popular new shopping mall.

== Politics ==
The current mayor of Bocholt is Christian Mangen of the Free Democratic Party who has been serving as mayor since 2025. In the 2025 local elections he was supported by the FDP, the SPD and the City party of Bocholt. He was elected with 53.5% of the vote in the runoff election.

=== City council ===
After the 2025 local elections, the Bocholt city council is composed as follows:

Party	Votes	%	+/-	Seats	+/-
Christian Democratic Union (CDU)	14,772	42.9	▼4.6	21	▼2
Social Democratic Party (SPD)	7,014	20.4	▲1.1	10	▲1
Alternative for Germany (AfD)	3,947	11.5	▲8.9	6	▲5
Alliance 90/The Greens (Grüne)	3,193	9.3	▼3.8	4	▼2
City party of Bocholt (Stadtpartei)	1,698	4.9	▼2.6	2	▼2
The Left (Linke)	1,351	3.9	▲0.6	2	±0
Free Democratic Party (FDP)	1,037	3.0	▼1.9	1	▼1
Social List Bocholt	875	2.5	▲0.6	1	±0
Sahra Wagenknecht Alliance (BSW)	578	1.7	New	1	New
Valid votes	34,465	99.2			
Invalid votes	283	0.8			
Total	34,748	100.0		48	±0
Electorate/voter turnout	58,007	59.9			
Source: City of Bocholt

=== Coat of arms ===
The coat of arms shows a beech tree, which has been the symbol for the city since the 13th century. Bocholt translated into English roughly means "beechwood".

== Cyclists Bocholt ==
Bocholt is a designated bicycle city, and almost every citizen has one or more bikes, the bicycle network is vast and convenient. In the summer, foreign motorists need to take care because of the popularity of cycling in the city, and even in winter, many people travel only by bike. Group cycling tours, called "Pättkestouren", are particularly popular in the spring. Between 2005 and 2006 the city of Bocholt won the ADFC and BUND title of "most bicycle-friendly city in Germany" in the category of cities under 100,000 inhabitants. Bocholt is the first city in Germany to have a guarded bike station at a Bustreff and not at a railway station. A second bike station in Bocholt went into operation in 2008.

== Transport ==
Bocholt is the last stop on a 25-minute 2-way-1-track train route starting in Wesel traveling north to Bocholt.

The nearest airports to the city are Düsseldorf Airport, located 76 km (47 mi) south and Münster Osnabrück Airport, located 100 km (62 mi) north east of Bocholt.

In 2021 a new railway line between Bocholt and Düsseldorf main station started.

== Notable people ==
- Melchior von Diepenbrock (1798–1853), 1845 Prince-Bishop of Breslau, 1848 Member of the Frankfurt Parliament, 1850 cardinal

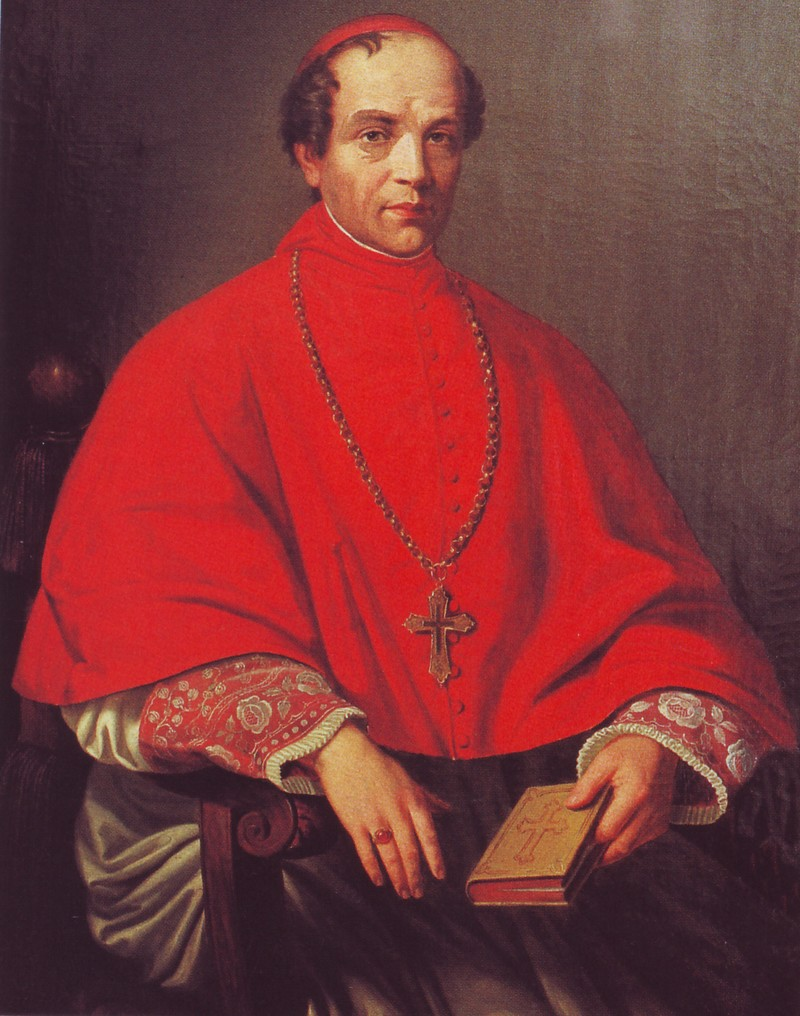
Melchior von Diepenbrock around 1850

- Jeanette Wolf (1888–1976), city council (SPD) 1919–32, persecution as a Jew and a Social Democrat from 1933 to 1945, city council of Berlin 1946 -1951, MP from 1952 to 1961, member of the Central Council of Jews in Germany
- Hermann von Bönninghausen (1888–1919), athlete and Olympian in 1908 and 1912
- Josef "Jupp" Elting (born 1944), football keeper from 1962 to 1980 at 1. FC Bocholt, then in the Bundesliga from 1964 to 1974 with Schalke 04 and 1. FC Kaiserslautern
- Karl-Heinz Petzinka (born 1956), architect and Rector of the Kunstakademie Düsseldorf
- Jutta Niehaus (born 1964), cyclist
- Peter Hyballa (born 1975), football coach, currently at Dunajská Streda
- Carlo Ljubek (born 1976), actor, currently engagement at Cologne Theatre
- Benjamin Weigelt (born 1982), footballer, currently at Rot-Weiß Oberhausen
- Simon Terodde (born 1988), professional football player, currently at Schalke 04
- Marina Hegering (born 1990), professional football player, currently at VfL Wolfsburg
- Pascal Testroet (born 1990), professional football player, currently at FC Ingolstadt
- Phil Bauhaus (born 1994), professional road race cyclist, currently with Team Sunweb
- Benjamin Henrichs (born 1997), professional football player, currently at RB Leipzig

== International relations ==
Since 1978 students from Bocholt have participated in an exchange program with students from Canton, Massachusetts.

=== Twin towns – sister cities ===
Bocholt is twinned with:

- Aurillac, France
- Bocholt, Belgium
- Rossendale, England, United Kingdom

=== Friendly cities ===
Bocholt has friendly relations with:

- Akmenė, Lithuania
- Wuxi, China

== See also ==
- Bocholt Cross
