= Salm-Kyrburg =

European polity

Forest- and Rhine-County of Salm-Kyrburg Wild- und Rheingrafschaft Salm-Kyrburg
- 1499–1681
- Coat of arms
- Status: State of the Holy Roman Empire
- Capital: Kirn
- Government: Principality
- Historical era: Early modern Europe
  - Partitioned from Upper Salm: 1499
  - Partitioned into three: 1607
  - Comital line extinct; inherited by S-Neuweiler: 1681
Preceded by	Succeeded by
Upper Salm	Salm-Neuweiler

Coat of Arms: Princes of Salm-Kyrburg

Salm-Kyrburg was a state of the Holy Roman Empire located in present-day Rhineland-Palatinate, Germany, one of the various partitions of Salm.

== History ==
It was twice created: the first time as a Wild- and Rhinegraviate (partitioned from Upper Salm), and secondly as a Principality (succeeding the earlier Principality of Salm-Leuze).

The first state of Salm-Kyrburg was partitioned between itself, Salm-Mörchingen and Salm-Tronecken in 1607, and was inherited by Salm-Neuweiler in 1681 upon the lines' extinction.

In 1742, Salm-Kyrburg was raised to a principality; it shared its vote in the Reichstag with Salm-Salm. Salm-Kyrburg was annexed by France in 1798; this was recognized by the Holy Roman Empire in the Treaty of Lunéville of 1801.

As a compensation, the princes were granted new territories formerly belonging to the Bishops of Münster in 1802, which formed the newly founded Principality of Salm.

The full title used by the Princes of the resurrected state was "Prince of Salm-Kyrburg, Sovereign Prince of Ahaus, Bocholt and Gemen, Wildgrave of Dhaun and Kyrburg, Rhinegrave of Stein".

The last prince, Frederick VI, morganatically married Louisa le Grand, with their descendants being created Barons of Rennenberg by Wilhelm II in 1917, but were deemed ineligible to inherit the title of Prince of Salm-Kyburg. With his death in 1905, the Salm-Kyburg family went extinct.

=== Princely seats and residences ===
The residences of the princes in the principality of Salm-Kyrburg were a hunting lodge in Sien and the summer palace Amalienlust in Kirn. Other residences were the Hôtel de Salm in Paris, and the castle in Overijse in Belgium, which the princes of Salm-Kyrburg inherited when Maximilien Emmanuel, Prince of Hornes died.

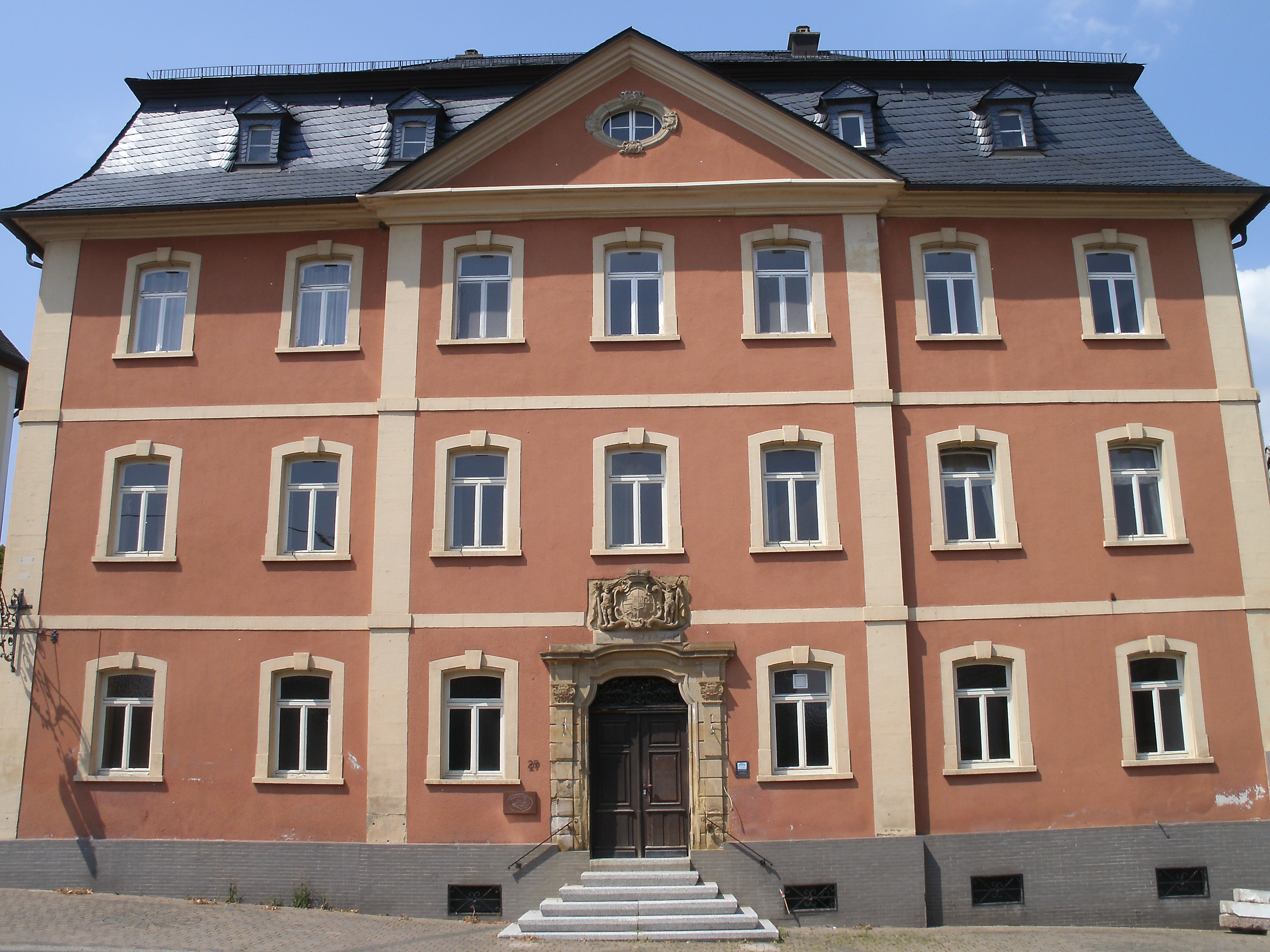
Schloss Sien, a hunting lodge which was used as the main residence in the principality

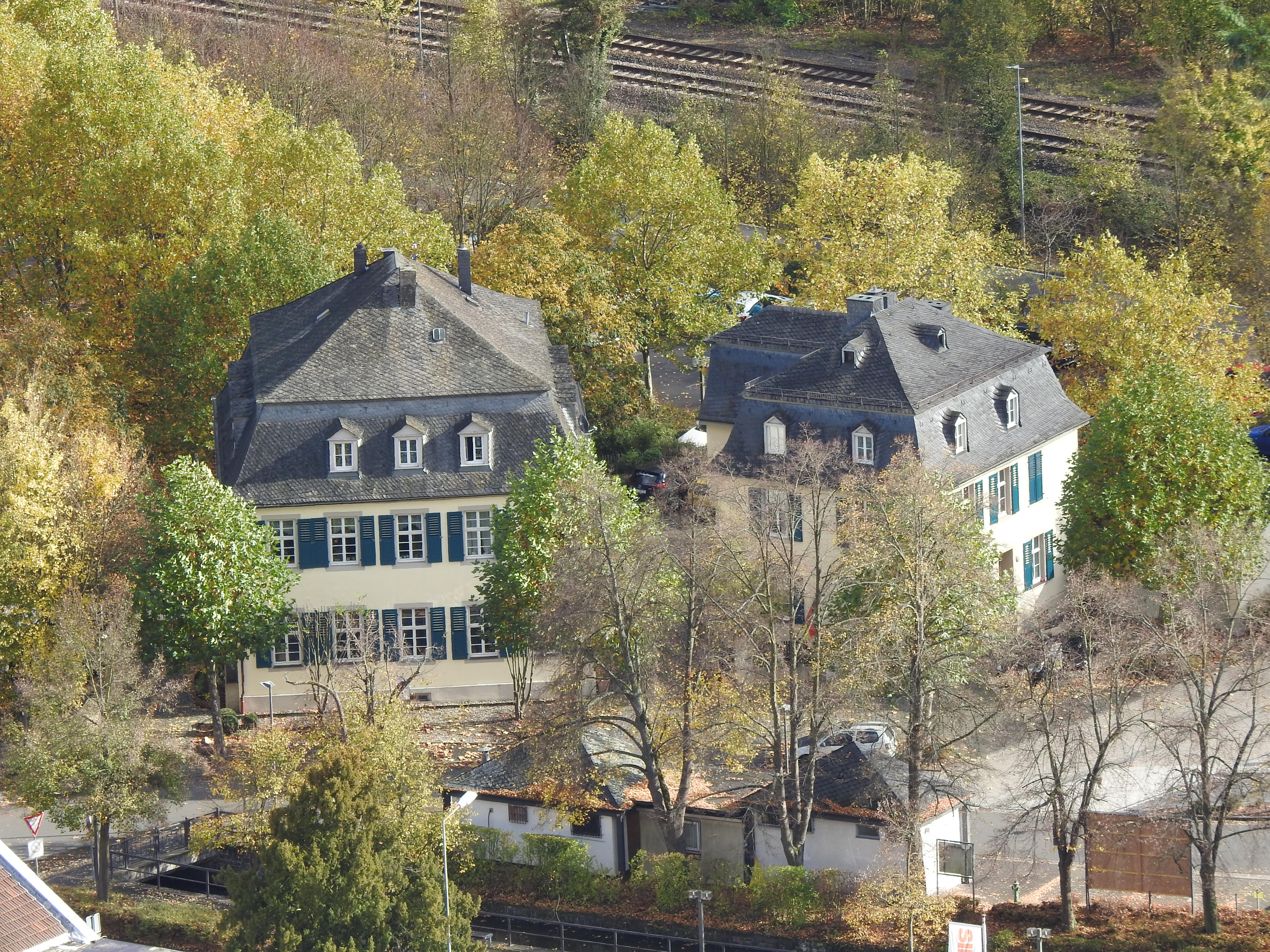
Schloss Amalienlust in Kirn

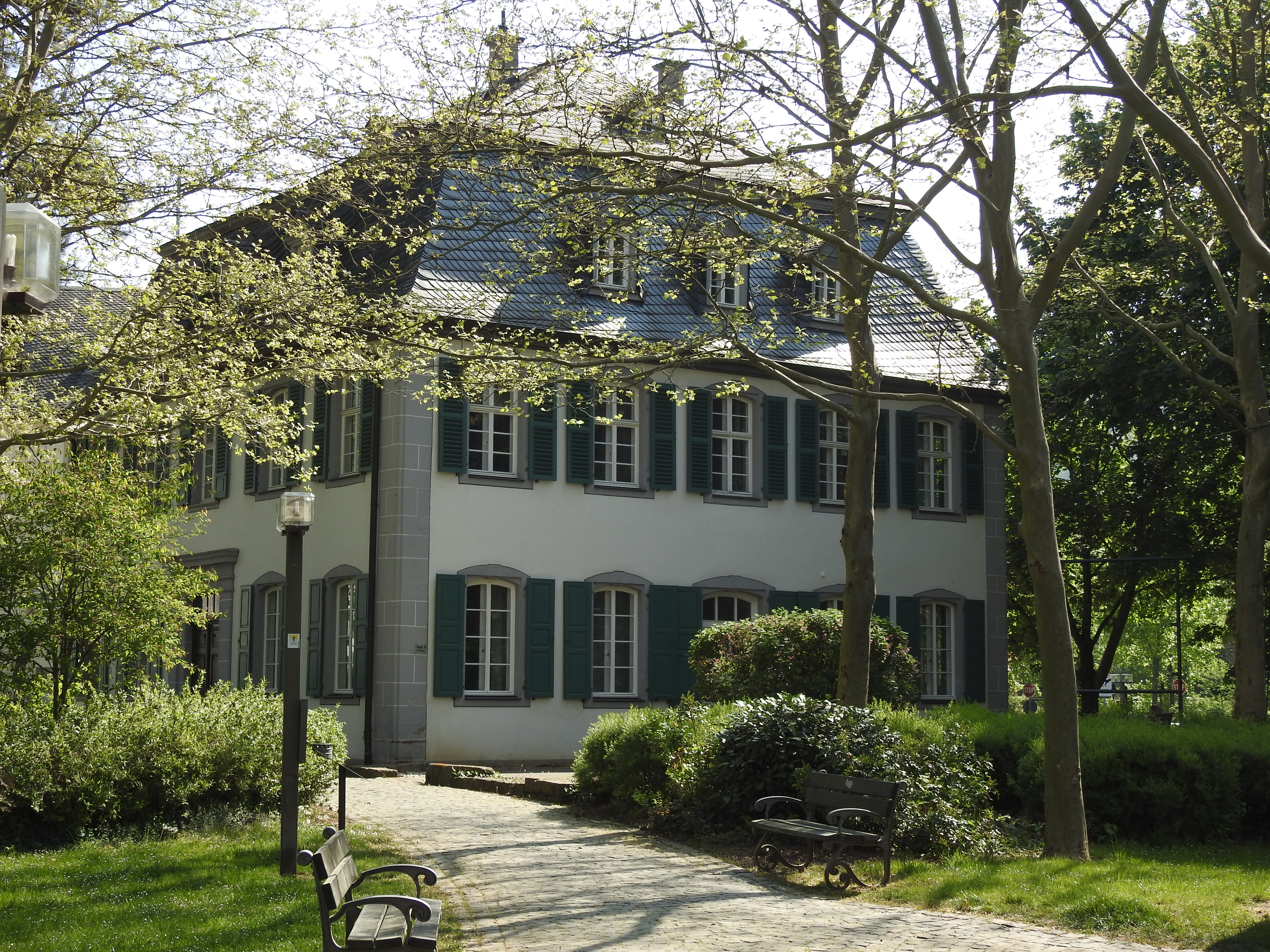
Another view of Schloss Amalienlust

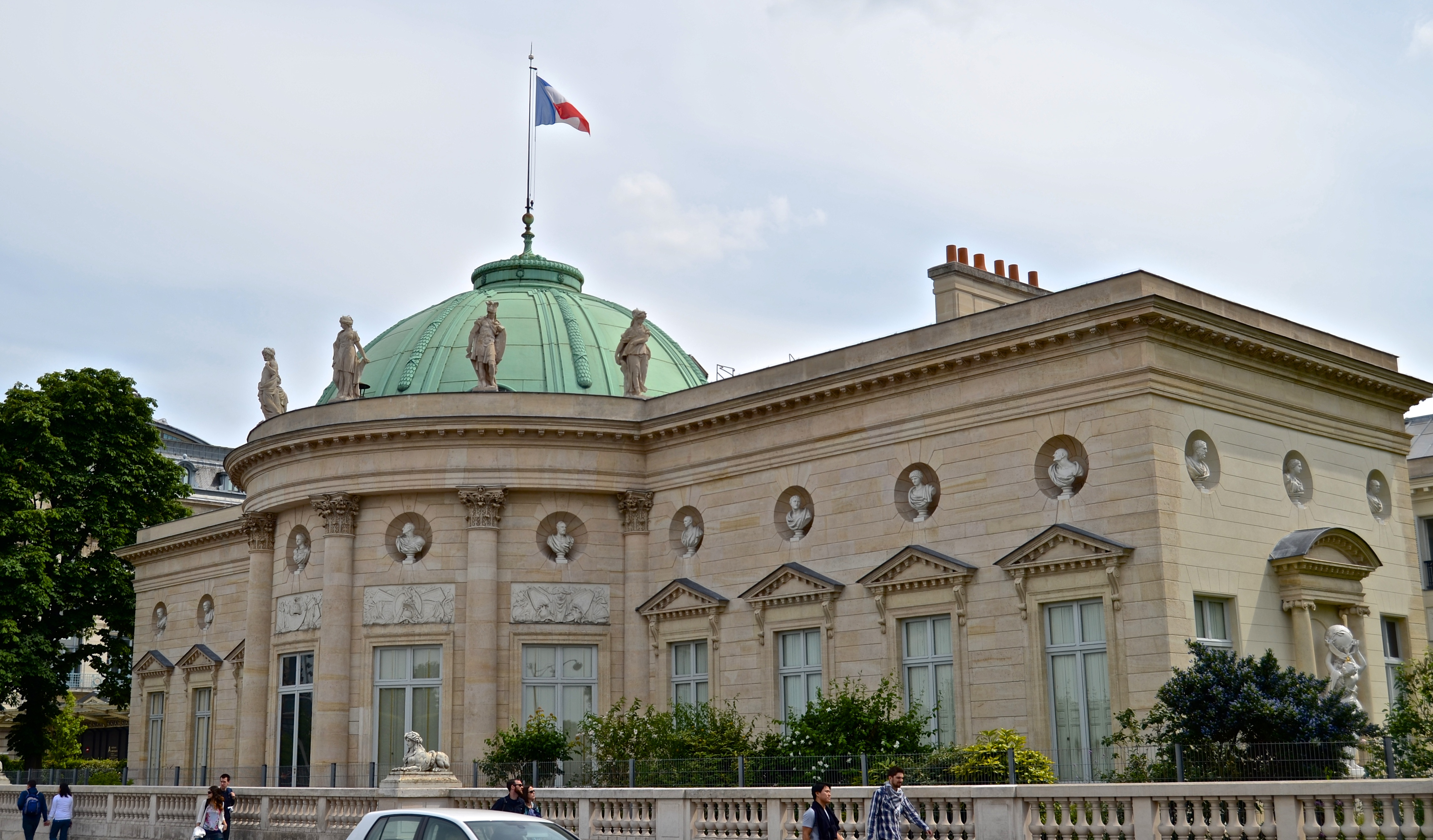
The Hôtel de Salm in Paris

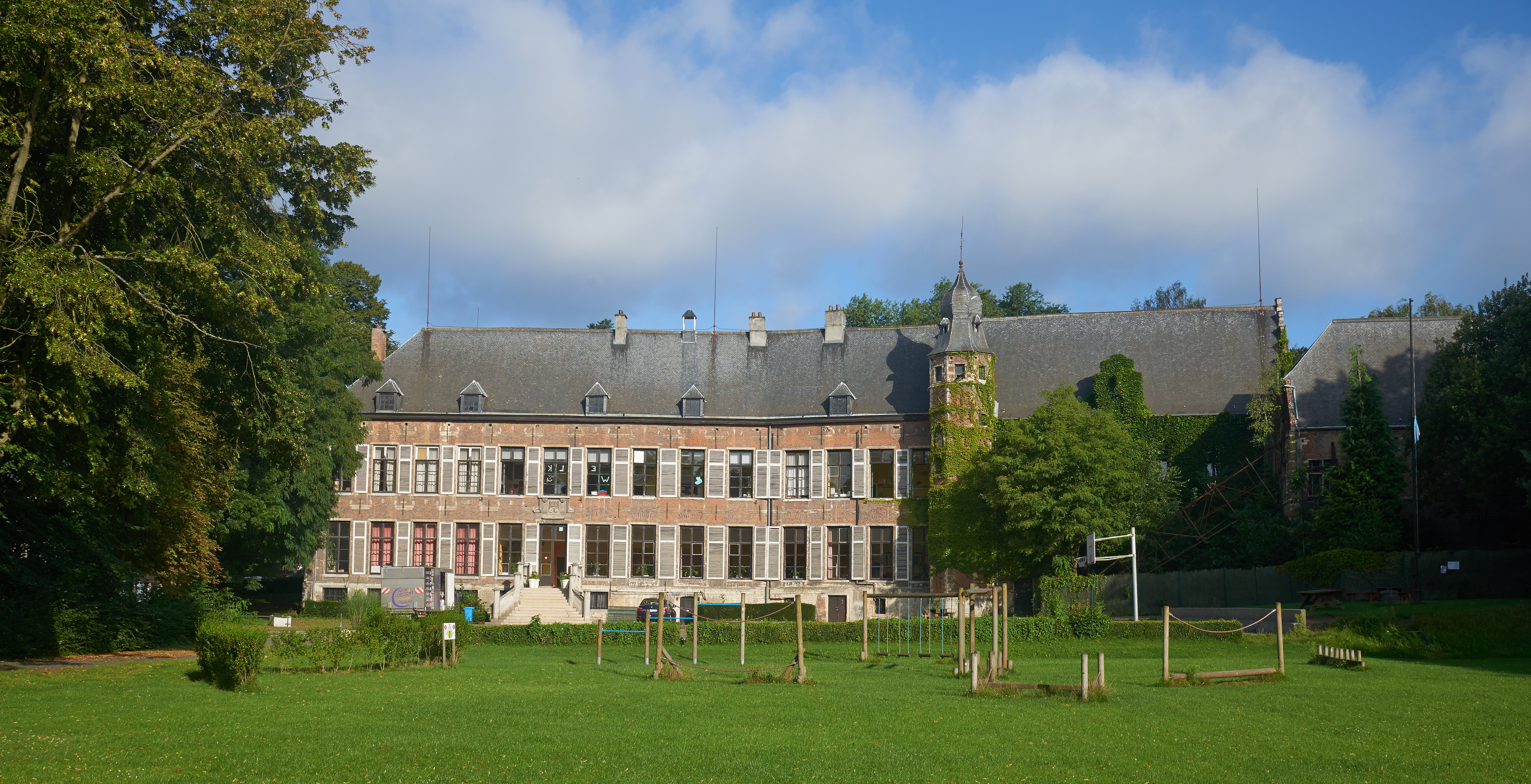
The castle in Overijse

== Princes of Salm-Kyrburg ==
=== Wild- and Rhinegraves (1499–1681) ===
- John VII (1499–1531)
- John VIII (1531–1548)
- Otto I (1548–1607)
- John Casimir (1607–1651)
- George Frederick (1651–1681)

=== Sovereign princes (1743–1813) ===
- Philip Joseph (Wild- and Rhinegrave of Salm-Leuze) (1743–1779)
- Frederick III (1779–1794)
- Frederick IV (1794–1813)

=== Mediatised princes within Prussia (1813–1905) ===
- Frederick IV (1813–1859)
- Frederick V (1859–1887)
- Frederick VI (1887–1905)
