= Frederick III of Salm-Kyrburg =

Frederick III
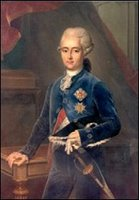

Prince of Salm-Kyrburg
- Reign: 1779–1794
- Predecessor: Philip Joseph
- Successor: Frederick IV
- Born: May 3, 1744
- Died: July 23, 1794 (aged 50); Paris, France
- Burial: Picpus Cemetery, Paris
- Spouse: Princess Johanna Francesca of Hohenzollern-Sigmaringen
- Issue: Hereditary Prince Frederick Henry Otto; Prince Frederick Emmanuel; Frederick IV, Prince of Salm-Kyrburg; Princess Philippine Friederike
- Father: Philip Joseph, Prince of Salm-Kyrburg
- Mother: Princess Maria Theresa of Hornes

Frederick III, Prince of Salm-Kyrburg (Frederick John Otto Francis Christian Philip; 1744–1794) was the prince of Salm-Kyrburg, Hornes and Overijse, Gemen and Count of Solre-le-Château. He was the eldest son of Philip Joseph, Prince of Salm-Kyrburg and Princess Maria Theresa of Hornes, and he grew up at the French court. Through his mother, the eldest daughter of Maximilian, Prince of Hornes, he inherited all the possessions of the Hornes family. He held the title from 1779 to 1794.

== Life ==
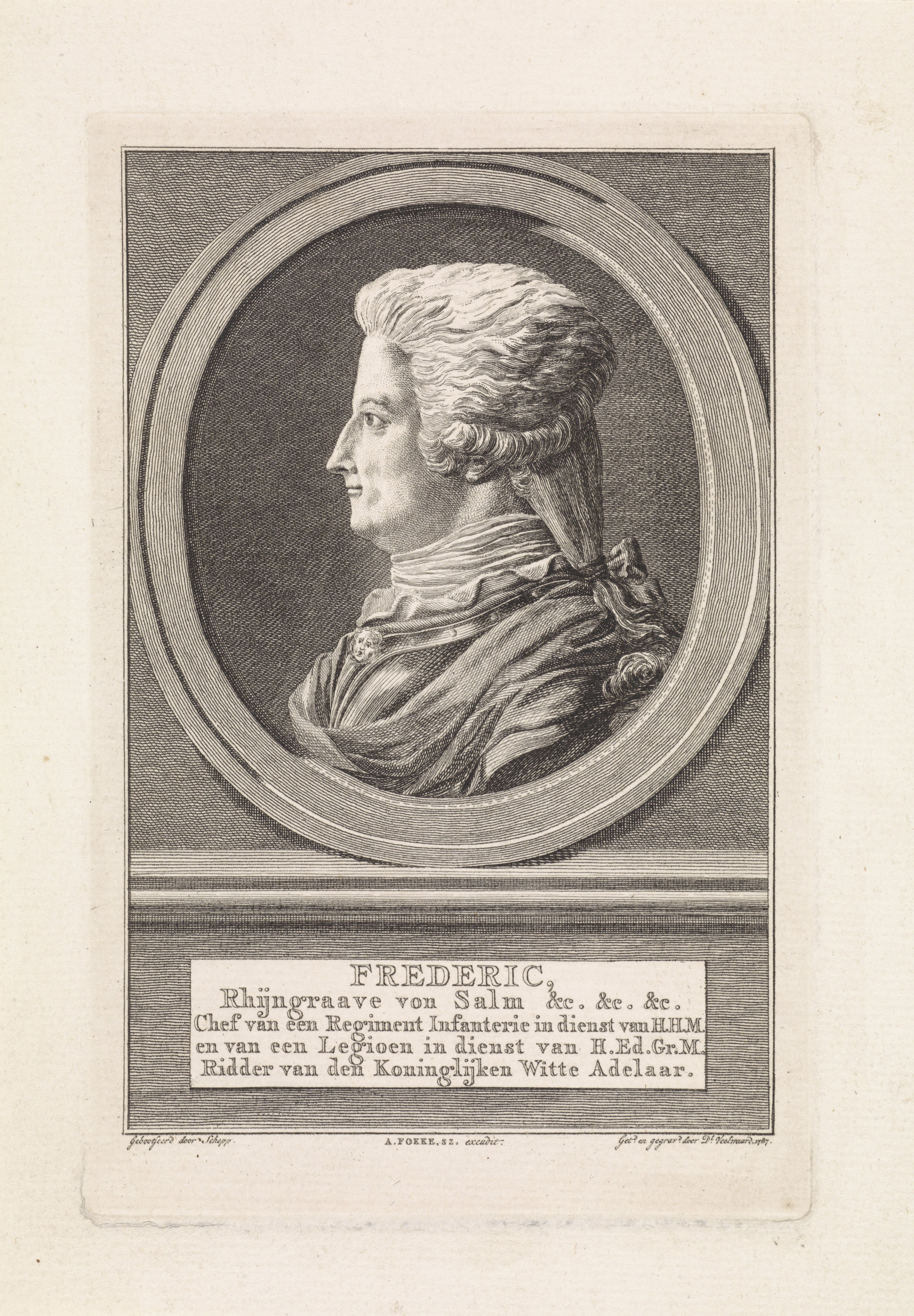
Portret van de legeraanvoerder Frederik III, Rijngraaf van Salm, RP-P-OB-66.640

Frederick III was many times confused with a relative Johann Friedrich von Salm-Grumbach who also was styled as Rhinegrave of Salm.

In 1794, he was guillotined together with Alexandre de Beauharnais, the lover of his sister Amalie Zephyrine van Salm-Kyrburg, for their ties with the "Ancien Régime".

== Hôtel de Salm ==
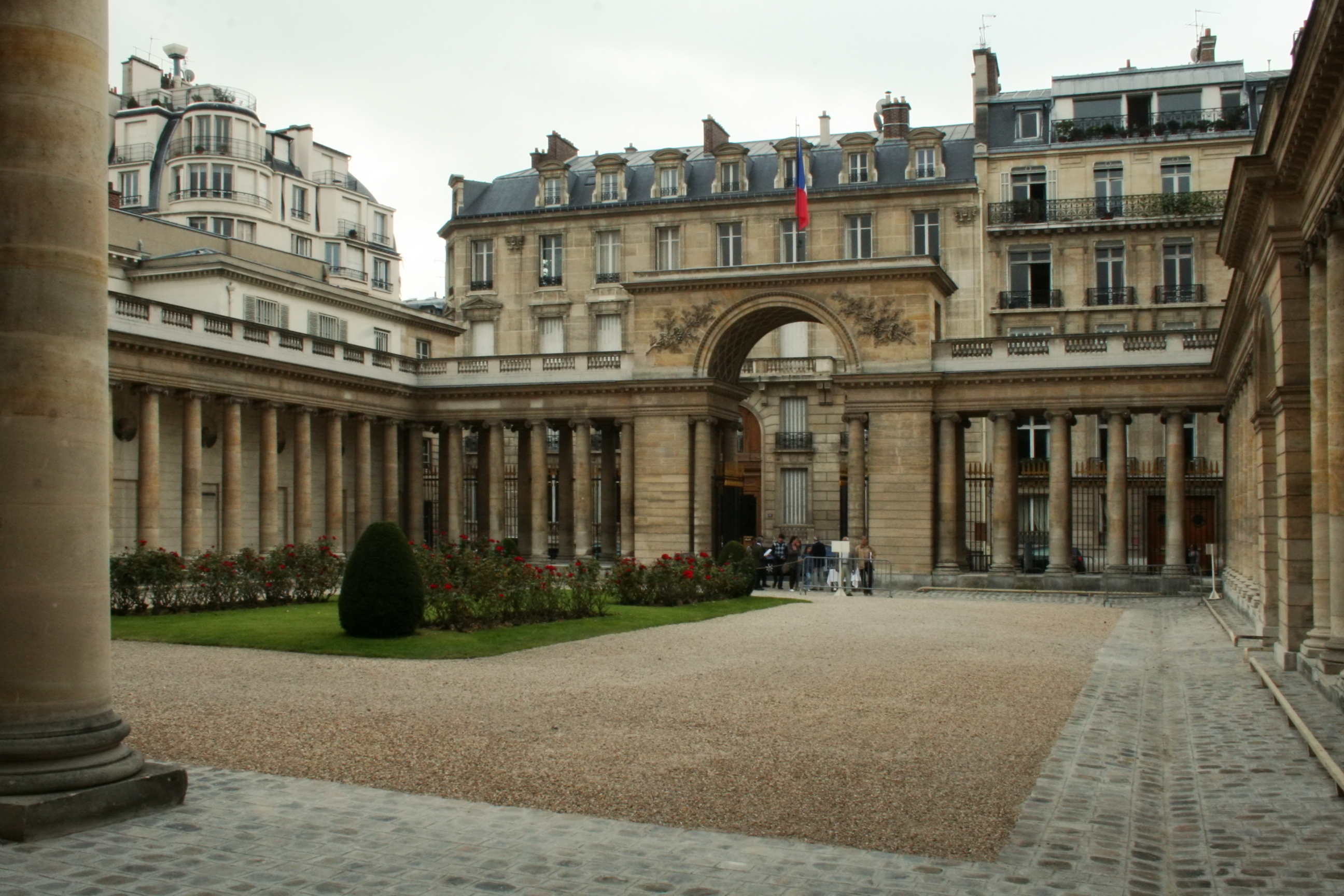
Hôtel de Salm courtyard

Frederick commissioned the construction of the Hôtel de Salm in Paris, where Madame de Stael gave her soirees in 1797. From 1804, the Légion d'honneur resided in the building, but it was destroyed by fire in 1871. The structure was rebuilt and is now known as the Palais de la Légion d'Honneur. Henry Hope wanted to copy the Hôtel de Salm in Haarlem, for his Villa Welgelegen.

== Marriage and issue ==
Frederick married in 1781 to Princess Johanna Francesca of Hohenzollern-Sigmaringen, daughter of Karl Friedrich, Prince of Hohenzollern-Sigmaringen. They had four children, of whom only one lived to adulthood:

- Princess Philippine Friederike Wilhelmine (1783–1786)
- Hereditary Prince Frederick Henry Otto (1785–1786)
- Prince Frederick Emmanuel Otto Louis Philip Conrad (1786)
- Prince Frederick IV Ernest Otto Philip Anton Furnibert (1789–1859), his father's successor

== Ancestry ==
Charles Florentin, Count of Salm
Henry Gabriel Joseph, Count of Salm
Marie Gabrielle de Lalaing, Countess of Hoogstraeten
Philip Joseph, Prince of Salm-Kyrburg
Philippe François Albert, marquis de Warneck
Princess Marie Therese of Croÿ
Claudine Françoise de la Pierre du Fay
Frederick III, Prince of Salm-Kyrburg
Philippe Emanuel, Prince of Hornes
Maximilian, Prince of Hornes
Princess Marie Anne Antoinette of Ligne
Princess Maria Theresa of Hornes
Thomas Bruce, 2nd Earl of Ailesbury
Lady Marie Bruce
Charlotte d'Argenteau, comtesse d'Esneux
