= Principality of Salm =

French client state in Westphalia, 1802–1811

Principality of Salm Fürstentum Salm (German)
- 1803–1811
- Flag

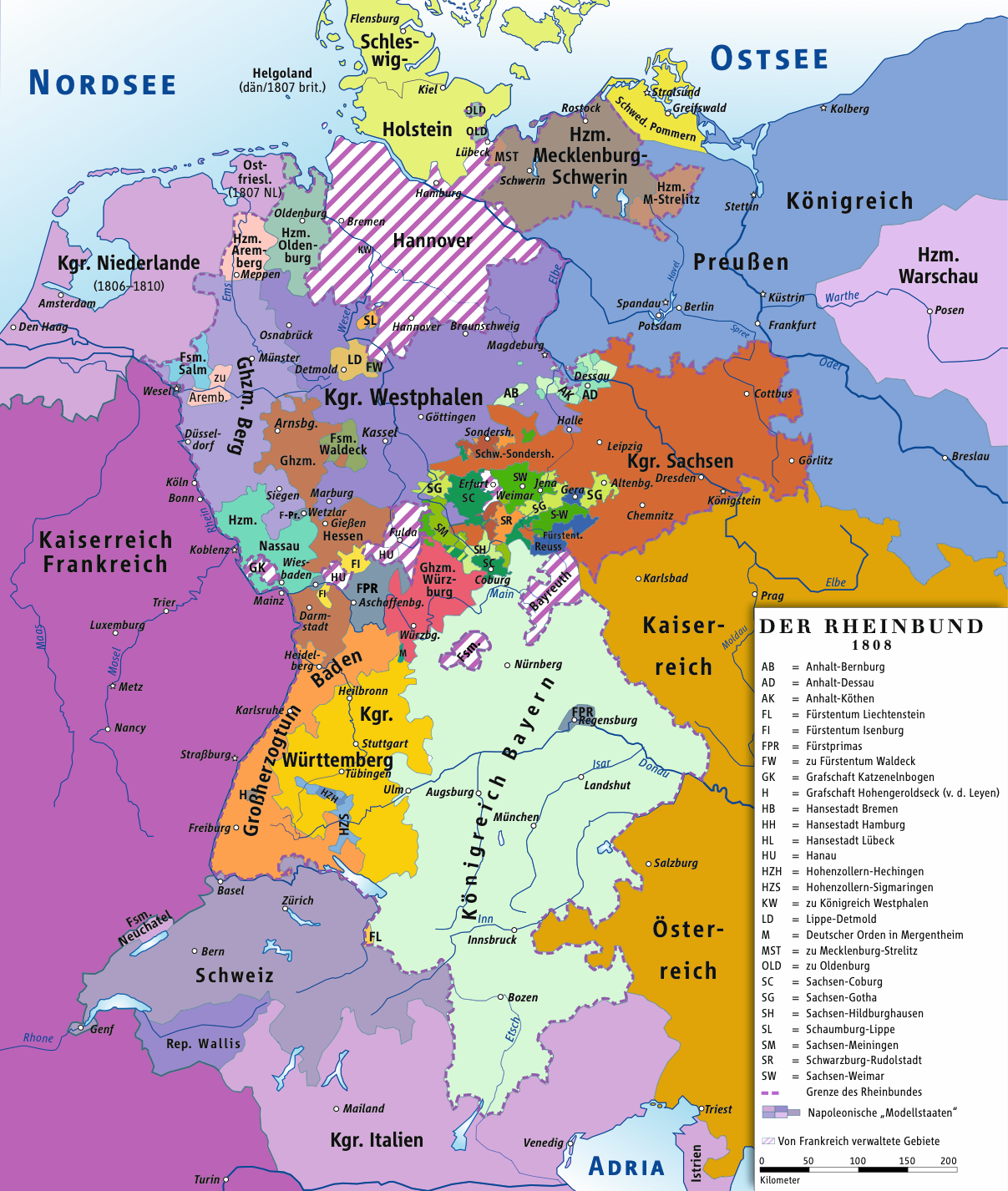
- Map of the Principality of Salm within the Confederation of the Rhine in 1808. (South of Holland) Principality of Salm in green, modern day German in light green
- Status: Client of the First French Empire, State of the Confederation of the Rhine
- Capital: Bocholt
- Government: Principality
- Historical era: Napoleonic Wars
  - Created from Cty Anholt and Bp Münster: 1803
  - Joined Confed. of the Rhine: 1806
  - Annexed by France: 1811
  - Mediatised to Prussia: 1815
Preceded by	Succeeded by
Bishopric of Münster; County of Anholt	Lippe (department)

The second Principality of Salm (German: Fürstentum Salm) was a short-lived client state of Napoleonic France located in Westphalia.

== History ==
The Principality of Salm was created in 1632 as a state of the Holy Roman Empire, and re-created in 1803 in order to compensate the princes of Salm-Kyrburg and Salm-Salm, who had lost their states to France in 1793–1795. The territory of the new principality was formally assigned by the Reichsdeputationshauptschluss of 1803. The new territory was not near most of the old territories of the princes, but instead extended the County of Anholt, which had been a minor possession of the prince of Salm-Salm. Most of the area was taken from the dissolved Bishopric of Münster.

The Principality of Salm was ruled jointly by the princes of Salm-Kyrburg and Salm-Salm, Frederick IV, Prince of Salm-Kyrburg, and Constantine, Prince of Salm-Salm; each line had equal sovereign rights, but neither had a separate territory. Salm became independent and joined the Confederation of the Rhine in 1806. It was annexed by France in 1811. Its territory was given to Prussia by the Congress of Vienna in 1815; it became the westernmost part of the Prussian Province of Westphalia. The flag of Salm would be copied in 1871 by the newly created German Empire, who used the same flag.

== Geography ==
The capital of Salm was Bocholt. Salm had an area of about 1,700 km^{2} and a population of about 59,000. It covered approximately the same area as the present-day District of Borken.
