= Palais de la Légion d'Honneur =

Building in Paris, France

Coordinates: 48°51′37.33″N 2°19′27.59″E

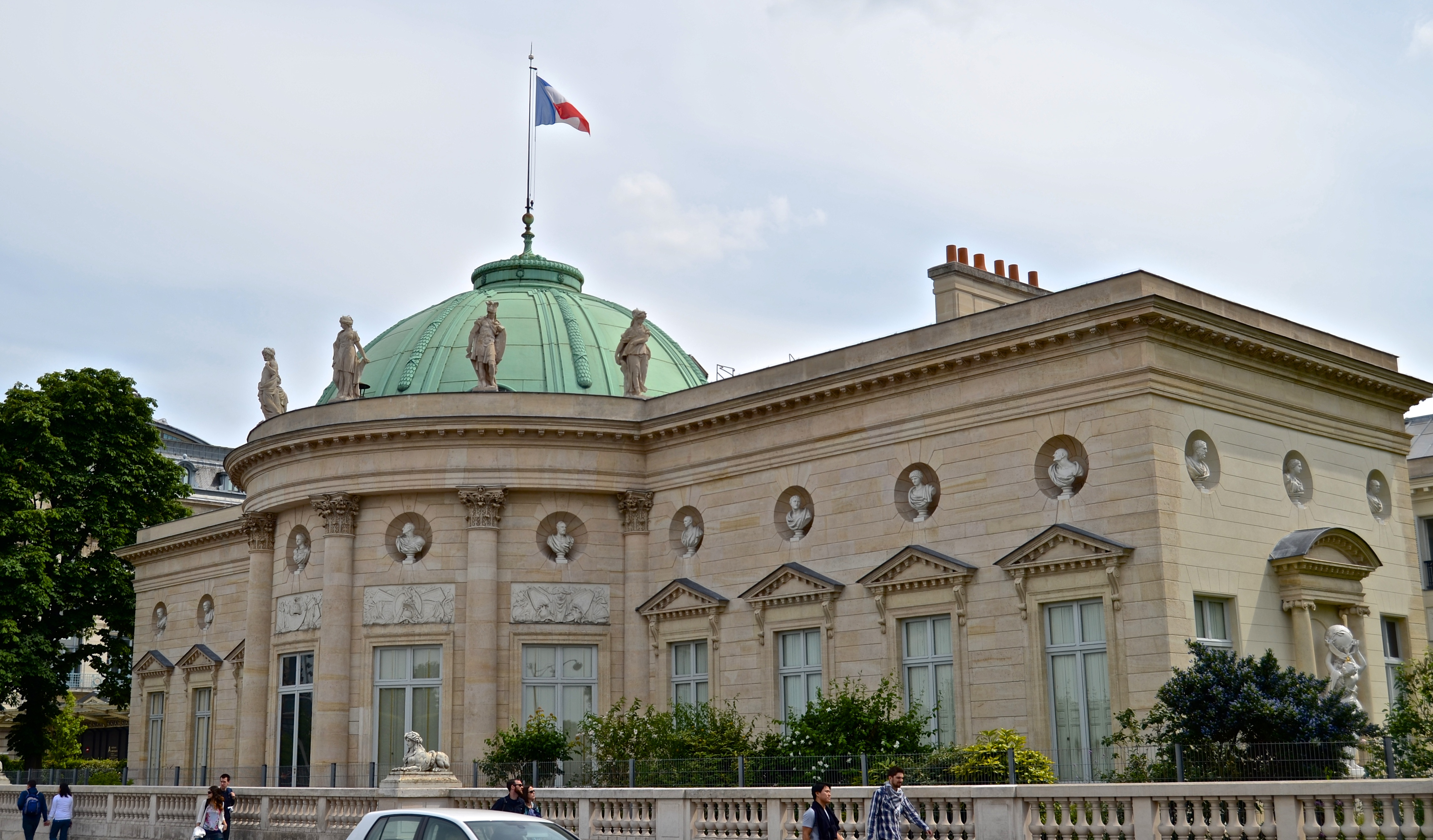
The Hôtel de Salm in 2014

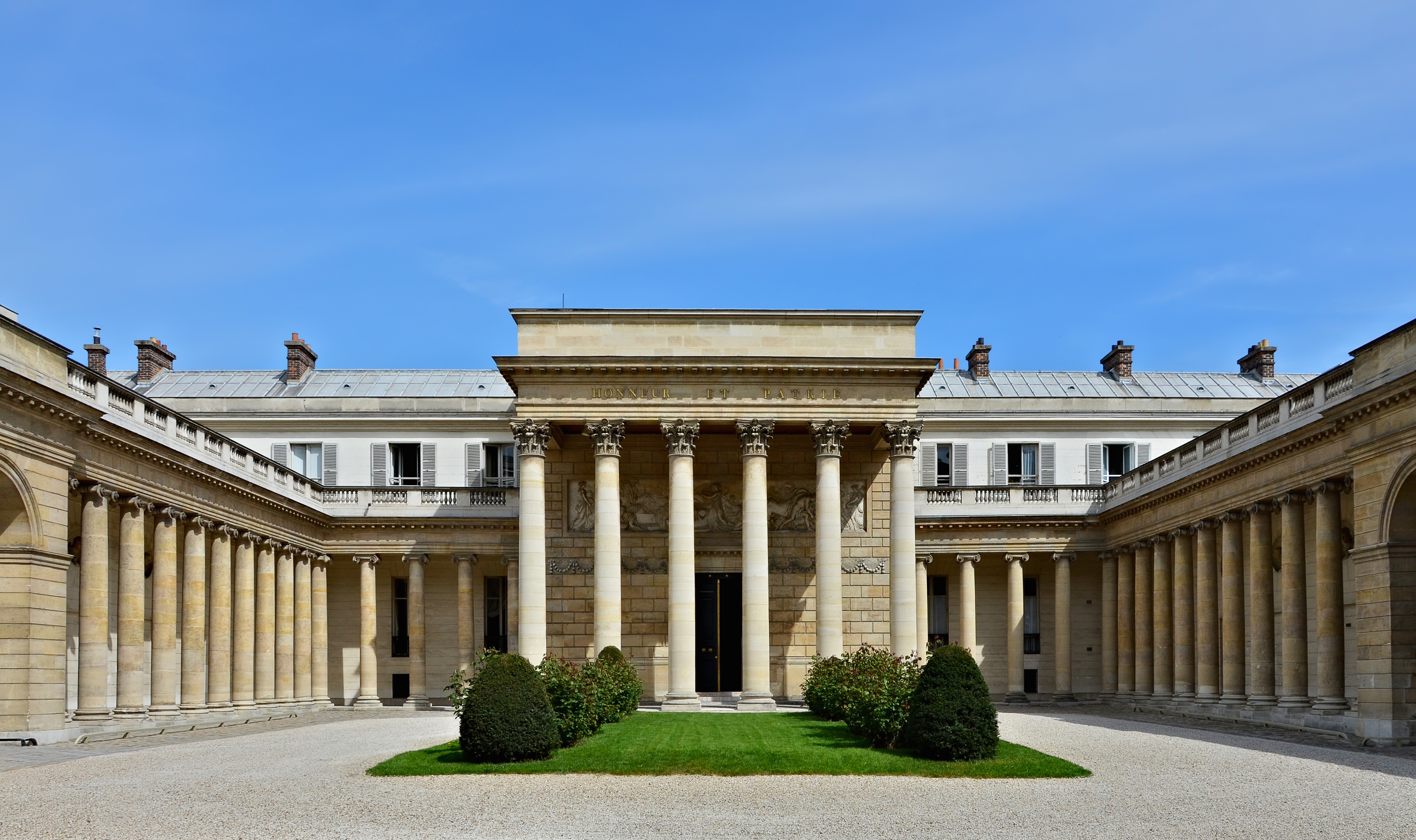
Inner courtyard

The Palais de la Légion d'Honneur (French pronunciation: [palɛ də la leʒjɔ̃ dɔnœʁ]; Palace of the Legion of Honour), also known as the Hôtel de Salm ([otɛl də salm]), is a historic building on the Left Bank of the River Seine in Paris, France. Originally built in the 1770s, and rebuilt after an 1871 fire, it houses the Musée de la Légion d'honneur (Museum of the Legion of Honour) and is the seat of the Legion of Honour, the highest French order of merit.

It is located at 64 Rue de Lille, next to the former Orsay railway station (now the Musée d'Orsay) in the 7th arrondissement.

== History ==
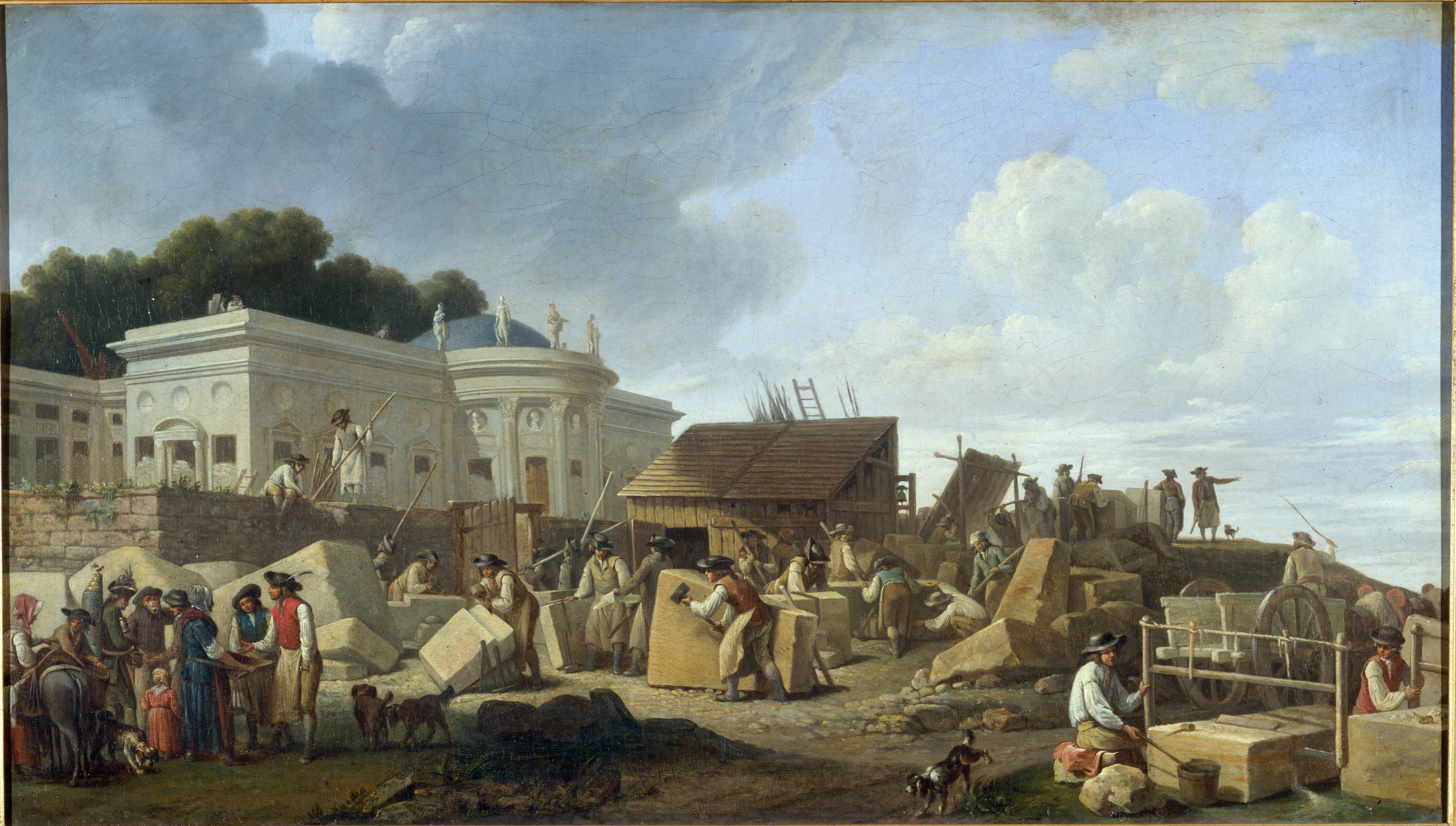
Construction of the original Hôtel de Salm

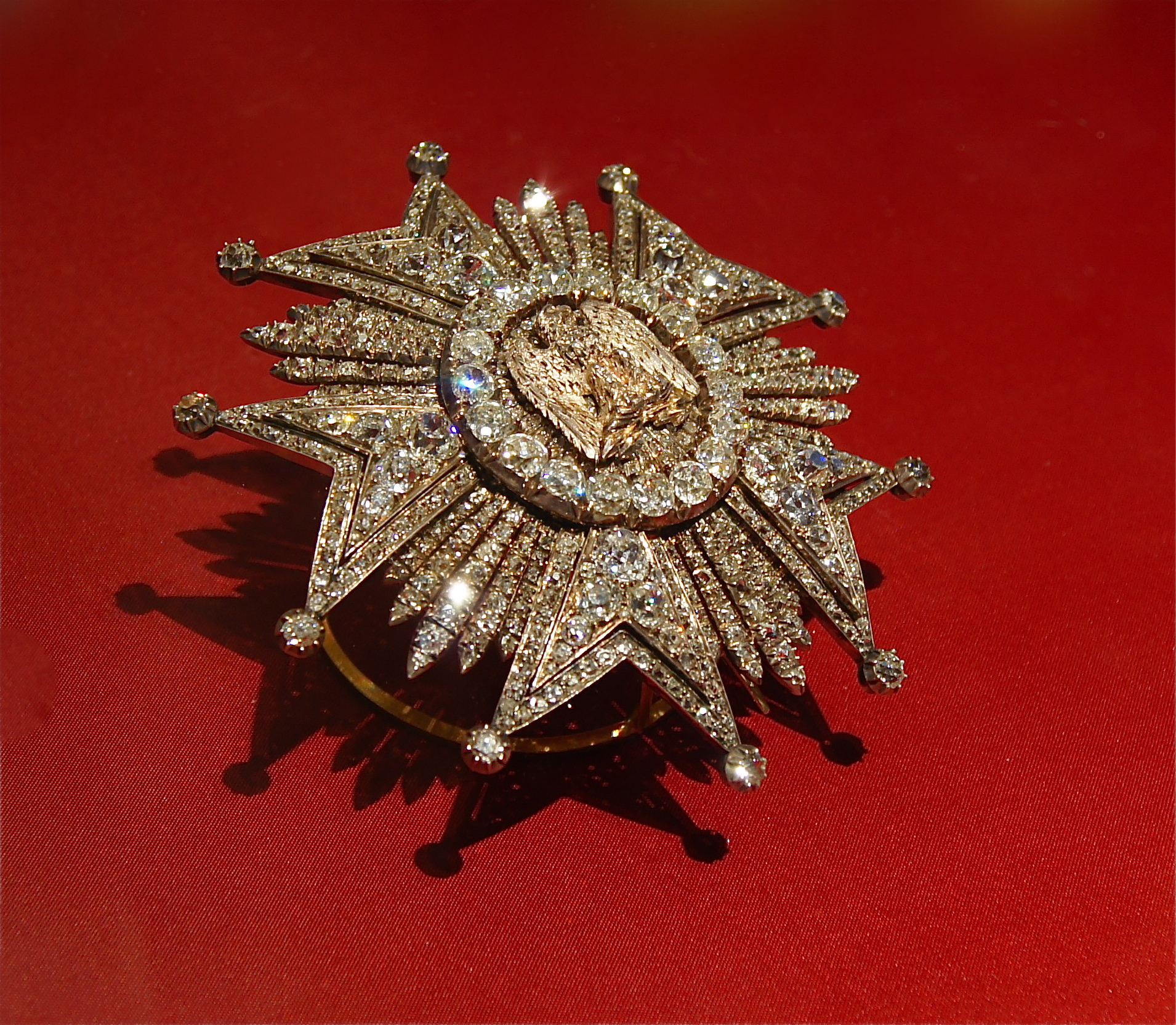
Diamond breast plaque of the Légion d'honneur

The original Hôtel de Salm was built as an aristocratic town house (an hôtel particulier) between 1782 and 1787 by the architect Pierre Rousseau (1751–1810) for Frederick III, Prince of Salm-Kyrburg, a member of a German princely family who owned estates in the Austrian Netherlands and spent many years in France. Thomas Jefferson wrote that he had "fallen in love in Paris", not with a woman but with the Hôtel de Salm, while it was under construction. The future Empress Joséphine was a frequent visitor in the early stages of the French Revolution.

The revolutionary government nationalised the building, and from 13 May 1804, it was renamed the Palais de la Légion d'honneur and became the seat of the newly created Légion d'honneur. The interior was remodeled for that purpose by Antoine-François Peyre, and new exterior sculptures were added by Jean Guillaume Moitte and Philippe-Laurent Roland.

An additional building was added in 1866 along the new Rue de Solférino, but the palace was burned in 1871 by the Paris Commune. A replica was rebuilt soon afterwards under Anastase Mortier, with painters Jean-Paul Laurens and Théodore Maillot providing interior decoration. An additional building was added from 1922–1925, on rue de Bellechasse in order to house a museum of the Légion d'honneur.

The building was classified as a historical monument in 1985.

== Influences ==
The architect John Nash included a domed semi-circular bow in his design for the garden front at Buckingham Palace (1825–1830), inspired by the Hôtel de Salm.

In Haarlem in the Netherlands, the banker Henry Hope had his Villa Welgelegen built to resemble the Hôtel de Salm. In Rochefort-en-Yvelines (near Paris), there is a larger-scale replica of the Hôtel de Salm. It was built between 1899, and 1904 for the wealthy business magnate Jules Porgès by the architect Charles Mewès, and it is known as the Château Porgès de Rochefort-en-Yvelines; today, it is a golf club.

The California Palace of the Legion of Honor, a three-quarter scale replica of the Hôtel de Salm, was constructed in San Francisco in 1924; it houses a fine arts museum.
