= Princess Louise of Stolberg-Gedern =

Louise of Stolberg-Gedern
- Countess of Albany
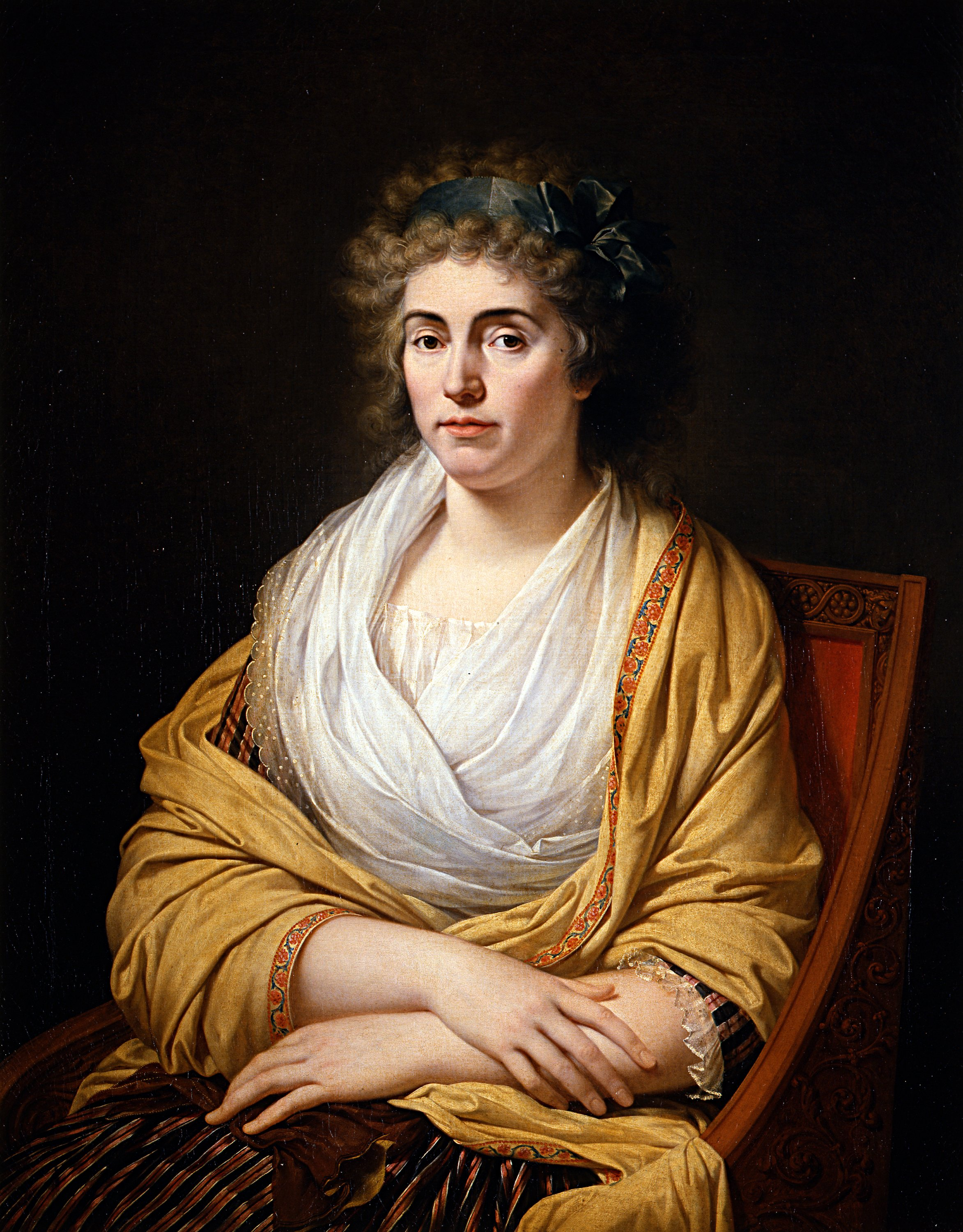
- Princess Louise of Stolberg-Gedern, oil on canvas by François-Xavier Fabre

Consort of the Jacobite pretender
- Pretendence: 28 March 1772 – 30 January 1788
- Born: 20 September 1752; Mons, Austrian Netherlands (modern-day Belgium)
- Died: 29 January 1824 (aged 71); Florence, Grand Duchy of Tuscany
- Spouse: Charles Edward Stuart (m. 1772; sep. 1780)
- House: Stolberg-Gedern
- Father: Prince Gustav Adolf of Stolberg-Gedern
- Mother: Princess Élisabeth Philippine of Hornes

Princess Louise Maximiliane Caroline Emanuel of Stolberg-Gedern (20 September 1752 – 29 January 1824) was the wife of Charles Edward Stuart, the Jacobite claimant to the English and Scottish thrones. The unhappy marriage led her to request from the pope a decree of separation, which she was granted. During her years in Paris and Florence, she established famous salons where important artists and intellectuals of the day were invited to gather. She is commonly called the Countess of Albany.

== Early life ==
Louise was born in Mons, Hainaut, in the Austrian Netherlands (now Belgium). She was the eldest daughter of Prince Gustav Adolf of Stolberg-Gedern and his wife, Princess Elisabeth of Hornes, the younger daughter of Maximilian, Prince of Hornes. She had three sisters. When she was only four years old, her father was killed at the Battle of Leuthen. His death left the family in much reduced financial circumstances.

When she was seven, she was sent to be educated at the school attached to the convent of St. Waudru in Mons. The mission of this convent was to provide a home for young ladies of the nobility who had insufficient financial means to live unmarried in the world. During her youth, she was said to be able to play guitar, sing and dance well and to enjoy reading French novels. However, she was said to be anxious to escape the convent because it was not a loving environment. In 1766, the Empress Maria Theresa arranged for the convent to give to Louise one of its endowed prebends. Although technically Louise was a secular canoness (a type of religious life with no vows), she was not a nun so she was not required to stay in the convent cloister and was not bound for life as other types of nuns. Indeed, for most of the canonesses, the acceptance of a prebend was merely a temporary stage until they found appropriate noble husbands. Louise was still allowed to travel in society, with the ability to marry.

== Marriage ==
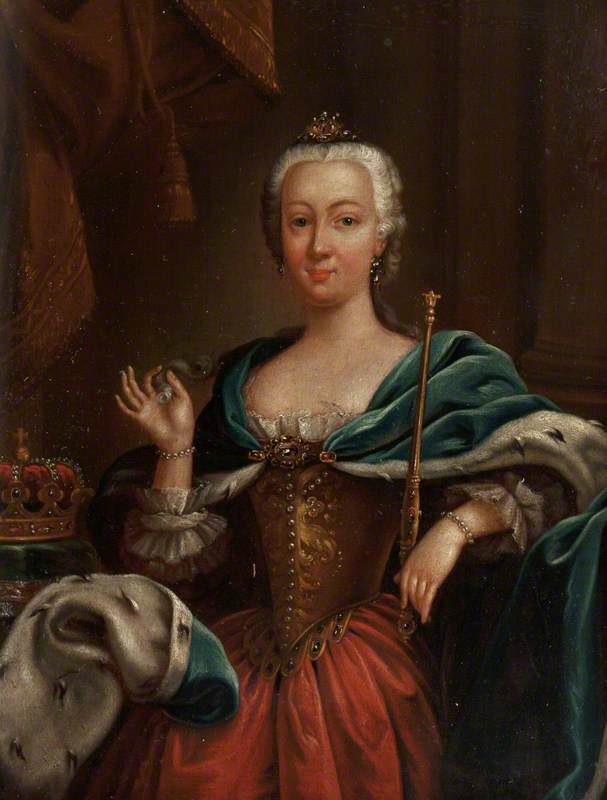
Princess Louise circa 1772

In 1771, Louise's younger sister (also a canoness at St. Waudru) married Don Carlos, Earl of Tinmouth, only son of the 3rd Duke of Berwick (great-grandson of King James II of England and VII of Scotland). Louise was said to be exceedingly attractive. With a need to find a bride for Charles Edward Stuart, the Jacobite claimant to the English and Scottish thrones, the Duke of Berwick's uncle, the Duke of Fitz-James, began negotiations with Louise's mother for a marriage between Louise and Charles. Part of this desire for Charles to marry stemmed from King Louis XV who recognised the succession of the House of Hanover, he also hoped that the legitimate Stuart line would not die out and would be an ongoing threat to the Hanoverians.

The negotiations were delicate, since Louise's family had little money of their own and relied totally on the goodwill of the Empress Maria Theresa, who provided financial care for the family. On 28 March 1772, Louise was married by proxy to Charles Edward in Paris. The couple met for the first time on 14 April 1772, when they renewed their marriage vows in person in the town of Macerata, Italy. Louise was henceforward recognised by Jacobites as Queen of England, Scotland, France and Ireland. The marriage was reported to have been consummated. Shortly afterwards, the couple travelled to Rome as a party in four State coaches, arriving at the Palazzo Muti on 22 April 1772. The Muti would be her home until she separated from her husband a few years later. On 25 April, Charles presented Louise with wedding gifts for his new bride, said to compose of 40,000 crowns and a gold box, set with diamonds.

Charles and Louise spent the first two years of their married life in Rome. While they were not formally received by the Vatican as "King and Queen of England", they were popular in Roman society. They regularly attended operas, concerts and receptions together. On account of her beauty, popular society gave her the nickname the "Queen of Hearts". In spite of the difference in their ages (he was 52, while she was 20), the couple were at first happy together, but there were several shadows on the relationship. There was no sign of Louise conceiving a child and Charles began drinking heavily. Charles had been encouraged in the belief that, if he married, the pope would recognise him as King of England and Scotland, and France might provide funds for another Jacobite rising. Louise had virtually been promised that she would be treated as a queen. Instead, Charles found his hopes both of a son and of diplomatic recognition disappointed, while Louise found herself married to an old prince with no prospects.

Charles and Louise left Rome in August 1774. They briefly resided at a villa between Parma and Piza, before moving to Florence a few months later. Here they used the title of "Count and Countess of Albany" to avoid difficulties the Italian nobility had with addressing them as "King and Queen of Great Britain". They stayed as guests of Prince Corsini until Charles bought the Palazzo di San Clemente in 1777. It was said that Louise did not enjoy her time in Florence.

== Count Vittorio Alfieri ==
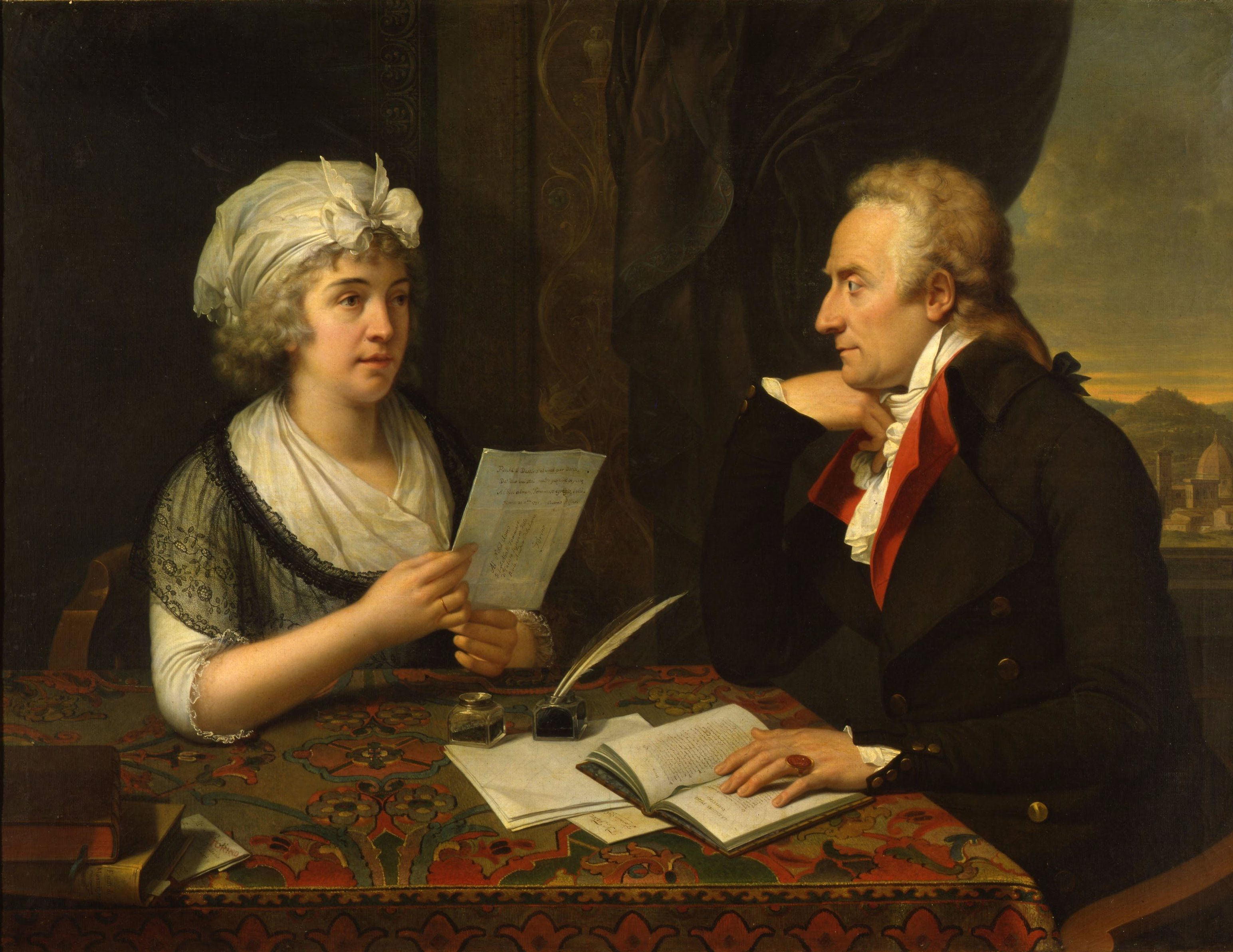
Alfieri and Louise, circa 1796

Count Vittorio Alfieri was born into a wealthy aristocratic family in Asti, now in Piedmont, in 1749. After several affairs with married women, he decided to devote himself to the writing of poetry and tragedies for the theatre. In 1776, during a stay in Florence, he came across Louise and was much taken by her. He did not follow up at this stage, but contented himself with admiring her from a distance. He left Florence to concentrate on study and furthering his literary ambitions. He returned to Florence in 1777 and this time sought an introduction to Louise. He fell in love with her and now determined to split her from Charles. He became a frequent visitor to the Palazzo di San Clemente and was welcomed unsuspectingly by Charles. There is no evidence of when Louise and Alfieri became lovers, but it was probably in 1778 when Alfieri penned her amorous sonnets, including one inviting her to elope with him.

Meanwhile, Louise's husband Charles had become a drunkard again, as he had been a number of years before. In December 1780, Louise left Charles and took refuge in a convent. She claimed, and it is widely believed to be true, that Charles had become physically abusive to her. The key event is said to be when Charles had been drinking following Saint Andrew's Day celebrations, and after accusing Louise of infidelities, may have attempted to rape her, resulting in her screaming to the extent that the household servants intervened. Louise received the support of the Grand Duchess of Tuscany, the pope, and her brother-in-law the Cardinal Duke of York, all of whom may have been unaware of Louise's ongoing adulterous relationship with Alfieri.

Charles and Louise left Florence in 1777 and returned to Rome. She lived briefly at the Ursuline Convent before moving to her brother-in-law's official residence, the Palazzo della Cancelleria. Alfieri followed Louise to Rome, where for two years they carried on their affair in secret. In April 1783, the Cardinal Duke of York finally discovered the truth. In early May, Alfieri left Rome and Louise, in order to avoid being expelled by force. In November 1780, Louise formally left Charles, moving first to a convent and then eventually her brother-in-law's estate.

In April 1784, Charles was induced by King Gustav III of Sweden to grant Louise a decree of separation. The couple did not divorce, since no such legal procedure existed in the Papal States, but Louise was thereby legally permitted to live separately from her husband, even though she had been doing so for time. The pope agreed also that Louise should receive half of Charles's pension.

In June 1784, Louise left Rome, purportedly to summer at the baths of Baden. In August, she was reunited with Alfieri at Colmar. They spent the next two months together at the castle of Martinsburg. In order to continue to keep their meeting secret from the Cardinal-Duke of York (who was the chief source of Louise's income), they separated again, and Louise spent the winter of 1784/1785 in Bologna. She summered in Paris before returning to Martinsburg, where she was joined again by Alfieri in September. After two months, Louise returned to Paris.

In 1786, the Cardinal-Duke of York learnt of the continued, ongoing relationship between Louise and Alfieri which he thought had ended. This caused a complete rupture between Louise and her brother-in-law. Henceforth, she made no attempt to hide her relationship with Alfieri. From December 1786 onwards, they lived together as a couple, with only occasional and brief separations.

On the last day of January 1788, Louise's husband Charles died. This resulted in a substantial improvement in her financial situation, thanks to a previously agreed pension from the King of France. Although Louise now had the freedom to marry Alfieri, they did not regularise their relationship, since Alfieri had always opposed the institution of marriage. They lived at first together in Paris. There, Louise established a famous salon in her home, to which the most important writers, artists, and intellectuals were invited. They remained in France during the early stages of the French Revolution in 1789, but then proceeded to England for safety. While in England, she was received by the Royal Family but under the title "Princess Louise of Stolberg-Gedern". She and Alfieri explored London and toured the West Country of England before returning again to France. However, the political situation had worsened for them in France. In 1792, the 10th of August insurrection encouraged them to flee from Paris, only two days before the republican authorities went to their home to arrest them. They escaped first to Germany and then made their way to Florence.

Louise and Alfieri then chose to settle in Florence. In 1793, Alfieri purchased Palazzo Gianfigliazzi, a mansion overlooking the River Arno. Here, Louise re-established her famous salon, although perhaps on a somewhat smaller scale than in Paris. Louise continued to live with Alfieri until his death in 1803.

== Later life ==
After Alfieri's death, Louise's companion was the artist François Xavier Fabre. It seems unlikely that their relationship was a romantic one. Louise continued to live in Florence until 1809, when she was summoned to Paris by Napoleon during France's war with Britain. He asked if she had ever given birth to Charles Edward's child, hoping to find a legal heir who could then be used to cause insurrection in Britain. When she replied "no", the meeting was abruptly terminated. A year later, she was allowed to return to Florence.

Louise died on 29 January 1824. She is buried in the Basilica di Santa Croce in Florence (in the Castellani Chapel); Alfieri is also buried in the basilica (between the tombs of Machiavelli and Michelangelo).

== Ancestry ==
Ancestors of Princess Louise of Stolberg-Gedern

8. Louis Christian, Count of Stolberg-Gedern
4. Frederick Charles, Prince of Stolberg-Gedern
9. Duchess Christine of Mecklenburg-Güstrow
2. Prince Gustav Adolf of Stolberg-Gedern
10. Louis Crato, Count of Nassau-Saarbrücken
5. Countess Louise of Nassau-Saarbrücken
11. Countess Philippine Henriette of Hohenlohe-Langenburg
1. Princess Louise of Stolberg-Gedern
12. Philippe Emanuel, Prince of Hornes
6. Maximilian, Prince of Hornes
13. Princess Marie Anne of Ligne
3. Princess Élisabeth Philippine of Hornes
14. Thomas Bruce, Earl of Elgin and of Ailesbury
7. Lady Marie Thérèse Charlotte Bruce
15. Charlotte d'Argenteau, comtesse d'Esneux

== Bibliography ==
- Bongie, Laurence (1986). The Love of a Prince - Bonnie Prince Charlie in France, 1744-1748. Vancouver: University of British Columbia Press. ISBN 978-0774802581.
- Douglas, Hugh (1975). Charles Edward Stuart. London: Hale. ISBN 978-0709148159.
- Douglas, Hugh (2003). Bonnie Prince Charlie in love. London: Sutton Publishing. ISBN 978-0750932752.
- Vaughan, Herbert M. The Last Stuart Queen. Brentano's, 1911
- Pininski, Peter (2010). A Life. Charlie. Amberley. ISBN 978-1-84868-194-1.
- Lee, Vernon (1884). The Countess of Albany. London: Ballantyne.

Titles in pretence
Vacant Title last held by Maria Clementina Sobieski	— TITULAR — Queen consort of England, Scotland and Ireland; 1772–88; Reason for succession failure: Glorious Revolution	Vacant Title next held by Maria Theresa of Austria-Este
