= House of Hornes =

Noble family

House of Hornes Huis Horne
- Country: Spanish Netherlands; Austrian Netherlands
- Titles: Lords of Loqueren; Lords of Gaesbeecq; Lords of Houtekercque; Viscounts of Furnes; Counts of Bassignies; Princes of Hornes
- Estates: Gaasbeek Castle; Horn Castle
- Dissolution: 1826; 200 years ago
- Cadet branches: Hornes-Bassignies

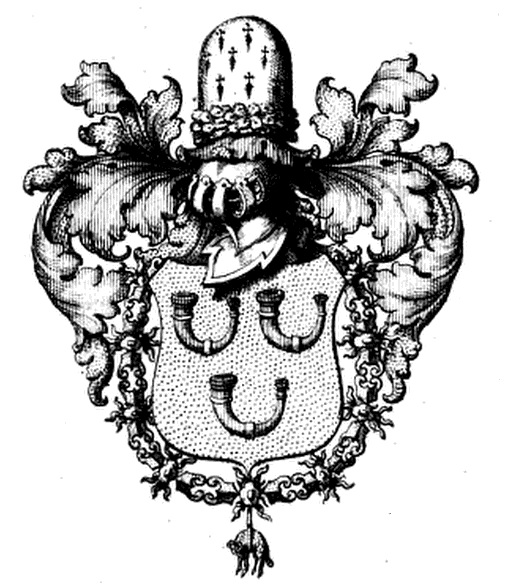
Coat of arms of Maximilian Emanuel, 3rd Prince of Hornes

Coat of arms of Maximilien de Hornes (d. 1542)

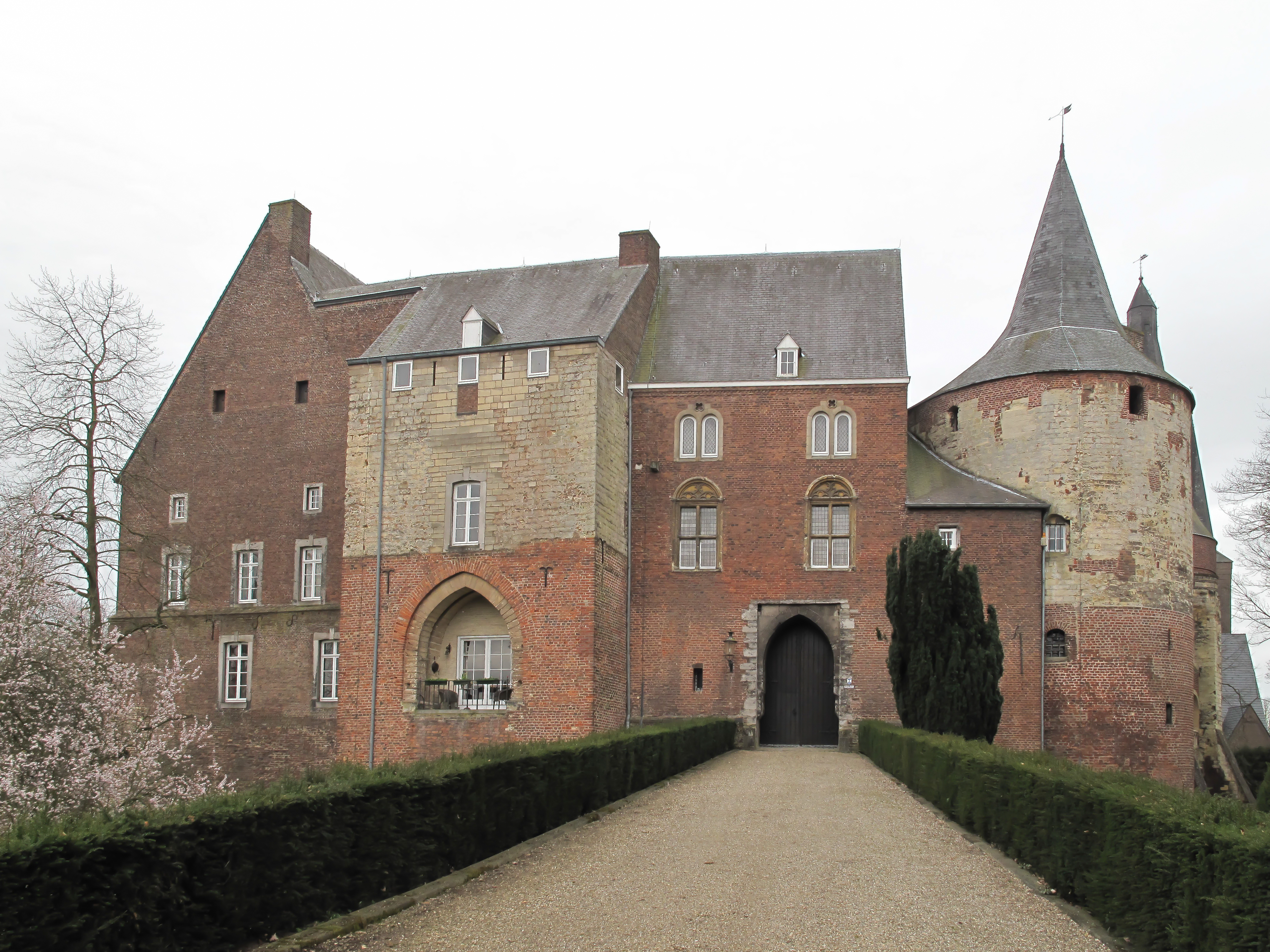
Horn Castle

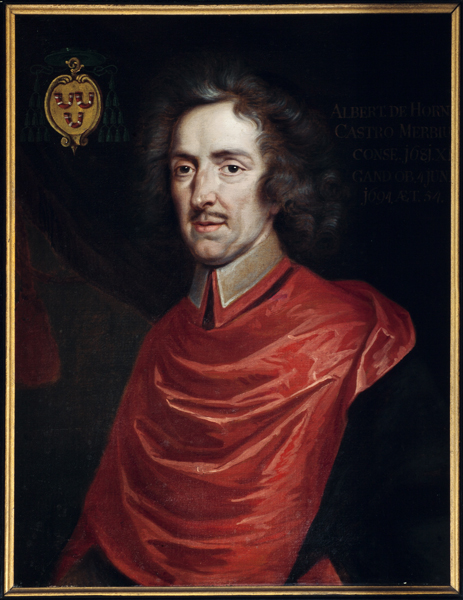
Albert of Hornes, Bishop of Ghent

The House of Hornes was an old and important European noble family, which became extinct in the male line in 1826. The name refers to Horn, a small village in Limburg, located in the Netherlands.

== History ==
=== Lordship ===
Originally, the lordship (Heerlijkheid) of Hornes was a property of the Counts of Looz. The first mentioned is Willaume, Sire of Hornes around 1100, and Arnould, Count of Looz and Lord of Hornes and Corswarem, married to Aleydis van Diest.

=== Principality ===
The Principality of Hornes, an enclave of Liège in the Spanish Netherlands, was created on October 16, 1677, and awarded by Charles II of Spain to Eugene Maximilian of Hornes (1631–1709), son of Count Ambrosius of Hornes. In 1736, Emperor Charles VI made Eugene Maximilian's grandson, Maximilian Emanuel, 3rd Prince of Hornes (1695–1763), an Imperial prince. Founded in the 9th century by Count Conrad I, this family's descendants intermarried with ruling dynasties of Europe. In 1514, Jacob III of Hornes had wed Claudina de Savoy and, in 1530, Anne de Bourgogne, who were extramarital descendants of, respectively, the sovereign Dukes of Savoy and of Burgundy. These titles and kinships enhanced the prestige of the House of Hornes.

The principality was close to the Duchy of Cleves and Thorn, Netherlands. The Princes of Hornes held territory in what is now Belgium, Germany and the Netherlands. In addition, in France they possessed the villages of Auchy-au-Bois and Lestrem from 1722 to 1766, and Floringhem from 1774 to 1789. Hornes became allied to France, and thus suffered during the French Revolution.

== Lords of Hornes-Bassignies ==
A branch of the family became lords and sires of Baucigny, sometimes known since the 12th century as Bassigny, Beaucigny, Baucignies or Bussigny. Cadet descendants of the Lords of Bassignies were known as Hornes-Bassignies. Both cadets and Lords of Bassignies married into important noble houses. The influence of the family was guaranteed by a unique familial network.

Philippe I de Hornes, Lord of Bassignies and Gaesbeecq (1421-1488):
married to Joanne de Lannoy.

  1. Arnold de Hornes, Lord of Gaesbeecq (1460-1505): see section below.
  2. Jean I de Hornes, Lord of Bassignies (1460-1521):
    married to Adrienne van Ranst, lady of Bocxtele.
    1. Philippe de Hornes, Lord of Bassignies, Imperial Lord Chamberlain:
      married to Claire de Renesse.
      1. Jean II de Hornes, Lord of Bassignies (1531-1606):
        married to Marie de St-Aldegonde (1535-1564).
        1. Gerald de Hornes, 1st Count of Bassignies (1560-1612), Royal Chamberlain: married to Honorine de Witthem.
          1. Ambroise de Hornes, 2nd Count of Bassignies (1609-1656): see section below.
          2. Pierre-Jean de Hornes-Bassignies.
          3. Honorine-Marguerite de Hornes-Bassignies x Godefroy de Berghes, 1st Count of Grimberghen
            1. Alphonse de Berghes, 7th Archbishop of Mechelen.
            2. Eugene de Berghes, 2nd Count of Grimberghen:
              married to Florence-Marguerite, daughter of René de Renesse, 1st Count of Warfusée.
              1. Philippe François de Berghes, 1st Prince of Grimberghen.
          4. Anna Marie de Hornes-Bassignies x Guillaume de Bette, 1st Marquis of Lede.
            1. Ambroise Auguste de Bette, 2nd Marquis of Lede, (1640–1677):
              married to Dorothea of Croÿ.
              1. Jean François, 3rd Marquis of Lede.
        2. Maximilien I de Hornes-Bassignies, Lord of Loqueren.
        3. Anne de Hornes-Bassignies x Adrien de Noyelles.
        4. Claire de Hornes-Bassignies x Charles de Wignacourt.
        5. Guillaume de Hornes-Bassignies, Lord of Kessel:
          married to Jeanne van Bronkhorst-Batenburg.
      2. Adrienne de Hornes-Bassignies:
        married to Baudouin III de Lannoy.
      3. Anne de Hornes-Bassignies x Christoph van Wilich-Grondstein.
    2. Anne de Hornes-Bassignies, Lady of Canticrode.

== Lords of Gaesbeecq ==
Gaesbeecq was one of the most important dominiums, including the famous Gaasbeek Castle, that the family possessed for several generations. Philippe de Hornes, Baron of Bassignies, sold Gaesbeecq in 1565 to Lamoral d'Egmont, Prince of Gavre. In 1615, Sabina d'Egmont sold Gaesbeecq to René de Renesse, 1st Count of Warfusée.

Arnold II of Hornes, Lord of Gaesbeecq (1460-1505):
married to Marguerite de Montmorency

  1. Maximilian de Hornes, Baron of Gaesbeecq; Hereditary Marshal of Hainaut:
    married to Barbe de Montfort
    1. Martin de Hornes, Baron of Gaesbeecq:
      married to Anne de Croÿ, Viscountess of Furnes.
      1. Marie of Hornes (1556 - 1605), Lady of Gaesbeecq:
        married to Philip, Count d'Egmont.
      2. Joris de Hornes; Count of Houtkerkcque, Viscount of Furnes
        married to Eleonore d'Egmont, daughter of Lamoral of Egmont
        1. Lamoral of Hornes (1582-1648):
          married to Julianne de Merode.
          1. Filips Lamoraal de Hornes, (1602-1663):
            married to Dorothee d'Arenberg
            1. Albert-François de Hornes, Bishop of Ghent.
  2. Jeanne of Hornes,
    Married to Hugues de Mélun, Viscount of Ghent.
    1. Anne de Mélun, Lady of Rosny, married to John IV de Béthune.

== Princes of Hornes-Bassignies ==
Although the agnatic line of the princes of Hornes is extinct today, amongst their cognatic descendants are the current royal family of Belgium and the Duke of Ursel. Other descendants included King Michael of Romania and Cayetana Fitz-James Stuart, 18th Duchess of Alba.

Ambroise de Hornes, 2nd Count of Bassignies (1609-1656):
married to Marguerite-Marie de Bailleul de Lesdaing

  1. Eugene Maximilian, 1st Prince of Hornes:
    married to Anne-Marie-Jeanne de Croÿ
    1. Philippe Emanuel, 2nd Prince of Hornes:
      married to Marie Anne Antoinette de Ligne.
      1. Marie-Joseph de Hornes-Bassignies,
        married to Philippe II Alexandre de Ghistelles, 3rd Marquis of Saint-Floris.
        1. Philippe III Alexandre, 1st Prince de Ghistelles
      2. Maximilian Emanuel, 3rd Prince of Hornes:
        married to Lady Marie-Thérèse Bruce
        1. Marie-Thérèse de Hornes-Bassignies x Philip Joseph, Prince of Salm-Kyrburg
          1. Amalie Zephyrine of Salm-Kyrburg x Anton Aloys, Prince of Hohenzollern-Sigmaringen
            1. Karl, Prince of Hohenzollern-Sigmaringen x Marie Antoinette Murat
              1. Karl Anton, Prince of Hohenzollern
                1. Princess Marie of Hohenzollern-Sigmaringen x Prince Philippe, Count of Flanders
                  1. Albert I, King of the Belgians x Elisabeth in Bavaria
                2. Leopold, Prince of Hohenzollern x Infanta Antónia of Portugal
                  1. Ferdinand I, King of Romania x Princess Marie of Edinburgh
                3. Stephanie of Hohenzollern-Sigmaringen x king Pedro V of Portugal
                4. Carol I, King of Romania x Elisabeth of Wied
          2. Frederick III, Prince of Salm-Kyrburg
        2. Elisabeth-Philippine de Hornes (1733-1826) x Gustav Adolf, Prince of Stolberg-Gedern.
          1. Princess Louise of Stolberg-Gedern x Charles Edward Stuart, the Young Pretender
          2. Caroline of Stolberg-Gedern (1755-1828) x Carlos Fitz-James Stuart, 4th Duke of Liria and Jérica
            1. Jacobo Fitz-James Stuart, 5th Duke of Liria and Jérica
  2. Honorine de Hornes-Bassignies: married to François, 2nd Count of Ursel (1626 - 1696):
    1. Conrad-Albert, 1st Duke d'Ursel (1665–1738)
      1. Charles, 2nd Duke d'Ursel
        1. Wolfgang-William 3rd Duke d'Ursel
          1. Charles-Joseph, 4th Duke d'Ursel: extant line.

== See also ==
- County of Horne
