= Marie, Princess of Hornes =

Marie, Princess of Hornes (30 September [O.S. 19 September] 1704 – 30 November 1736), Baroness de Melsbroeck suo jure, was the wife of Maximilian, Prince of Hornes.

== Early life ==
She was born Lady Marie Thérèse Charlotte Bruce in Brussels in present-day Belgium, where her father, Thomas Bruce, 2nd Earl of Ailesbury and 3rd Earl of Elgin, had lived in exile since fleeing England in 1697 to avoid being tried for treason. Her mother was Ailesbury's second wife, Charlotte d'Argenteau, comtesse d'Esneux.

== Marriage and issue ==
On 17 June 1722, Marie Thérèse married the Sovereign Prince of Hornes: Maximilian Emanuel (1695–1763), son of Philippe Emanuel, his predecessor, and Princess Marie Anne Antoinette de Ligne. They had two children, through whom she was the maternal grandmother of Princess Louise of Stolberg-Gedern, the unhappy wife of Jacobite pretender Charles Edward Stuart ("Bonnie Prince Charlie"), and Princess Amalie Zephyrine of Salm-Kyrburg, among others.
