= Lords of Saint-Floris =

List of lords of Saint-Floris, former Flemish title, coupled to the Heerlijkheid of Sint-Floris, located in Artois. The title belonged to the Flemish House of Haveskercke.

== Lords of Saint-Floris ==
Bernard van Haveskercke, Lord of Sint-Floris x Jeanne de Wissocq.

1. Justin de Haverskerque, Lord of Saint-Floris x Marguerite de Stavele.
  1. Marguerite de Haverskerque, Lady of Saint-Floris x Henri de Nedonchel.
    1. Jean i de Nedonchel, Lord of Saint-Floris x Marie of Cunchy, lady of Quesnoy
      1. Marie de Nedonchel, Lady of Saint-Floris x Gilles de Gosson
        1. Catherine de Gosson, Lady of Saint-Floris x
          Louis de la Plancque, Lord of Wastinnes.
          1. Barbara de la Plancque, Lady of Saint-Floris:
            Married in 1570 to Charles de Ghistelles, Grand Bailiff of the City of Bruges, Governor of Mechelen.
            1. Alexander de Ghistelles, Lord of Saint-Floris x
              married in 1610 to Florence de Wissocq
              1. Adrian-François de Ghistelles, 1st Marques of Saint-Floris.

== See also ==
- Marquess of Saint-Floris
