= Eugene Maximilian, Prince of Hornes =

Prince of Hornes (1631-1709)

Eugene Maximillian, 1st Prince of Hornes (1 October 1631 – 10 March 1709) was the son of Ambroise de Hornes, 2nd Count of Bassignies and Marie Marguerite de Bailleul de Lesdaing. He was a great-grandson of Philip de Lalaing, 3rd Count of Lalaing

He was made a Prince of the Empire on October 19, 1677, and his domain elevated to the Principality of Hornes. It was an enclave of Liege. He was married to Princess Anne Marie Jeanne of Croÿ and had one son, Philippe Emanuel, Prince of Hornes.

== Bibliography ==
- Gilliat-Smith, Ernest (1901). The History of Bruges. London: J. M. Dent.
