= Charlotte d'Argenteau, comtesse d'Esneux =

Belgian patrician heiress

Charlotte d'Argenteau, Countess d'Esneux (18 October 1678 – 23 July 1710), a patrician heiress from the Holy Roman Empire, was the beloved second wife of the English Jacobite exile Thomas Bruce, 2nd Earl of Ailesbury.

== Life ==
The only surviving child of Louis Conrad d'Argenteau, Count d'Esneux, and Marie Ghisberte de Locquenghien, Charlotte d'Argenteau met Lord Ailesbury when she was 21 and living in Brussels, Spanish Netherlands, with her widowed mother. Brussels gossip had it that despite her many good qualities she would probably never marry, due to her having a small dowry, and her mother an appalling temper. Within a short time of meeting her Ailesbury fell in love, and it seems his feelings were returned; friends however warned Ailesbury that Charlotte's mother would probably make difficulties. The Countess duly did so, and arguably on this occasion, she was not acting unreasonably. Ailesbury was after all more than 20 years older than Charlotte; more importantly, he had fled England to avoid being condemned to death as a traitor. Though the British Crown made no effort to extradite him, and had not seized his estates, he was only able to draw part of the rents from them. Eventually, he overcame his future mother-in-law's objections, although it is clear from his memoirs that he disliked her intensely.

The marriage was very happy. Charlotte was described as "a noble and virtuous lady, born to make anyone happy". In his memoirs, her husband, who rarely spoke of his first wife Lady Elizabeth Seymour, wrote of his second wife that "there was scarce her equal in goodness and sweetness and generous to the last degree"; although he could resist the gibe that she was "the reverse of her mother". Charlotte's stepchildren, Charles and Elizabeth, became deeply attached to her and she had one daughter of her own: Lady Marie Thérèse Charlotte Bruce, born in 1704. Ailesbury settled in Brussels so happily that when in time the English government made it clear that he could return home, he no longer had any wish to do so.

After ten years of marriage, Charlotte died of a fever in July 1710, aged 31, and was buried in the Church of the Brigittines, Brussels. Ailesbury was deeply grieved, and though he outlived her by 30 years he never made a third marriage. Their daughter Marie Thérèse became the wife of Maximilian, Prince of Hornes, and among Charlotte's great-grandchildren was Princess Louise of Stolberg-Gedern (the Jacobite consort from 1772 to 1788).
