= Philippe III Alexandre, 1st Prince de Ghistelles =

Philippe III Alexandre Emmanuel François de Ghistelles died 1808, was a French noble lord. He was 4th Marquess of Saint-Floris, Lord of Beuvry and became the 1st Prince de Ghistelles in 1760.

== Family ==
He was a member of the old noble House of Ghistelles or Ghistel, with Flemish origin dating from the 14th century. He was the son of Philippe II Alexandre, 3rd Marquess of Saint-Floris and Marie-Joseph, daughter of Philippe Emanuel, 2nd Prince of Hornes and Marie Anne Antoinette de Ligne. Maximilian, Prince of Hornes was his uncle. He was married in 1758 to Louise-Elisabeth de Melun, lady in waiting of Madame Victoire, the Dauphine of France. Their only son Philippe IV, 2nd Prince de Ghistelles was born in 1760.

== Life ==
Philipp resided in Beuvry, and was created Prince de Ghistelles by request of Empress Maria Theresa in 1760. During the French Revolution his residences and other rights were abolished, the prince fled to Mons, where he died in 1808. During his life the prince organised some important happenings, in 1784 he received the Robert brothers to demonstrate their hot air balloon in Beuvry. A monument was erected to remember this historic fact.

== Honours ==
- Knight Grand Cross of the Order of Saint Michael.
- Grandee of Spain, First Class, 1779.
