= Marquess of Saint-Floris =

French noble title

Marquess of Saint-Floris (Markies van Sint-Floris / Marquis de Saint-Floris) was a French noble title, belonging to the Picardian nobility. Saint-Floris is a town in former Flanders.

The title was created in 1674 by king Louis XIV for the House of Ghistel. However, the Lords of Saint-Floris belonged to old Flemish nobility, their descendants were incorporated by the French Crown. The title belonged to the Spanish Grandeza.

== Genealogic list ==
Charles de Ghistelles x Barbe de La Plancque, Lady of Saint-Floris.

- Alexander de Ghistelles, Lord of Saint-Floris x Florence de Wissocq.
  - Adrian-François de Ghistelles, 1st Marques of Saint-Floris x Marie-Françoise de Wissocq, Lady of Erny.
    - Philippe I Alexandre François de Ghistelles, 2nd Marquess of Saint-Floris x Marie-Isabelle de Crecquy
      - Philippe II Alexandre Marie Joseph Antoine de Ghistelles, 3rd Marquess of Saint-Floris x Marie-Joseph de Hornes-Bassignies.
        - Philippe III Alexandre Emmanuel François: 1st Prince de Ghistelles in 1760, 4th Marquess of Saint-Floris x Louise-Elisabeth de Melun.
