= Thomas Bruce, 2nd Earl of Ailesbury =

English politician and memoirist

The Earl of Ailesbury
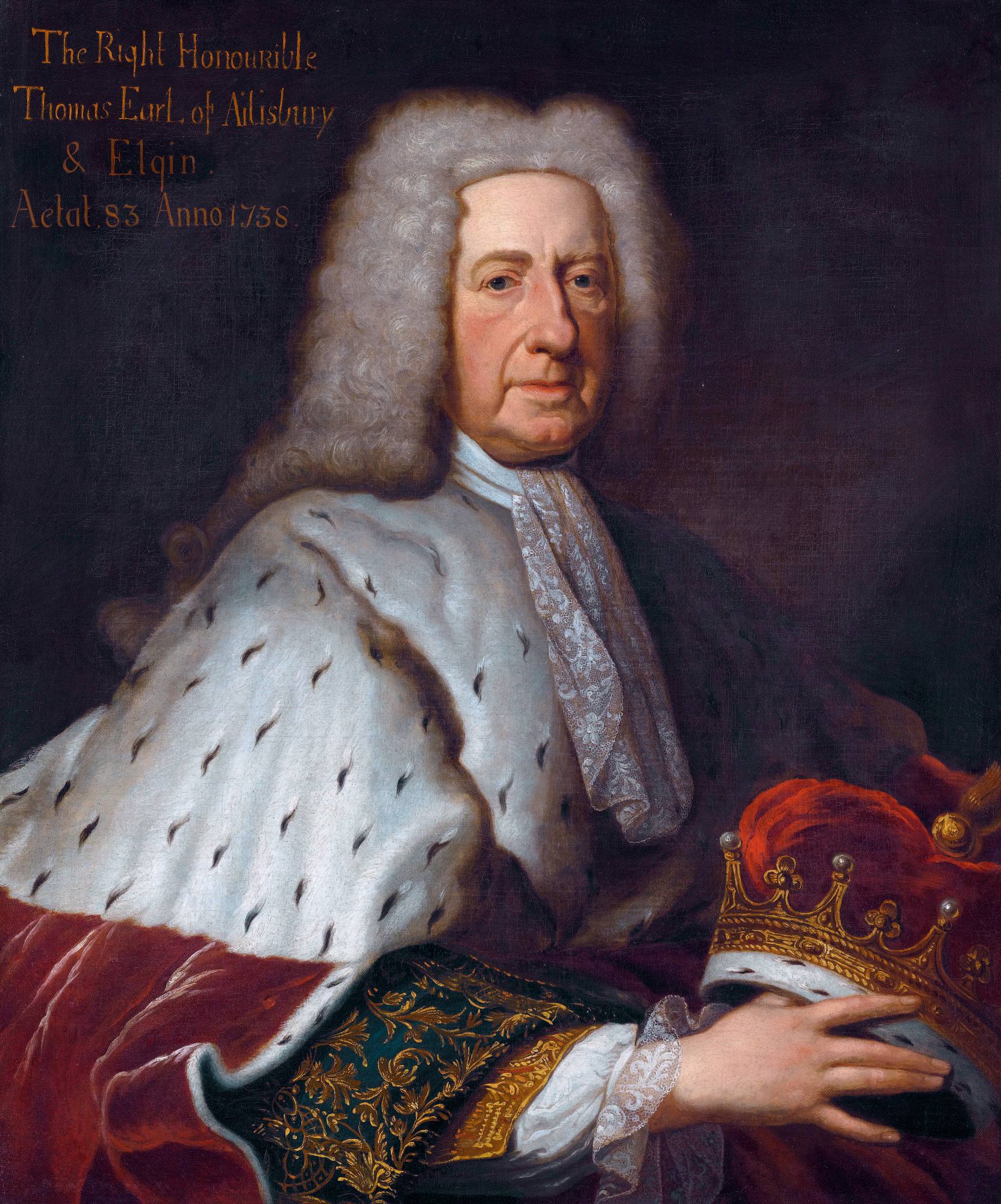
- Thomas Bruce, 2nd Earl of Ailesbury and 3rd Earl of Elgin, by François Harrewijn, 1738
- Born: 26 September 1656; Bedfordshire, Kingdom of England
- Died: 16 December 1741 (aged 85); Brussels, Austrian Netherlands, Holy Roman Empire
- Spouses: Lady Elizabeth Seymour; Charlotte d'Argenteau
- Issue: Robert Bruce, Lord Bruce; Charles Bruce, 4th Earl of Elgin; Elizabeth Brudenell, Countess of Cardigan; Marie, Princess of Hornes
- Father: Robert Bruce, 2nd Earl of Elgin
- Mother: Lady Diana Grey

Thomas Bruce, 2nd Earl of Ailesbury (later styled Aylesbury) and 3rd Earl of Elgin (26 September 1656 – 16 December 1741), styled Lord Bruce between 1663 and 1685, was an English politician and memoirist. He was the son of Robert Bruce, 2nd Earl of Elgin, and Lady Diana Grey. His maternal grandparents were Henry Grey, 1st Earl of Stamford, and Lady Anne Cecil, daughter of William Cecil, 2nd Earl of Exeter. His Memoirs, which were not published until long after his death, are a valuable source for English history in the last quarter of the seventeenth century.

== Early life ==
Lord Bruce was elected member of parliament for Marlborough between 1679 and 1681, and for Wiltshire in 1685. He became a Gentleman of the Bedchamber in 1676. From 1685, when he inherited the earldom, to 1688, he was a Lord of the Bedchamber, Lord Lieutenant of Bedfordshire and Huntingdonshire (the latter in the absence of the Earl of Sandwich) and was a Page of Honour, at the coronation of King James II on 23 April 1685. He was devoted to Charles II, who remarked on his deathbed "I see you love me dying as well as living"; Bruce wrote later of Charles' death that "Thus ended my happy days at a Court, and to this hour I bewail my loss". He also admired Charles's brother and successor James II, though he was not blind to his faults as a ruler.

== Family ==
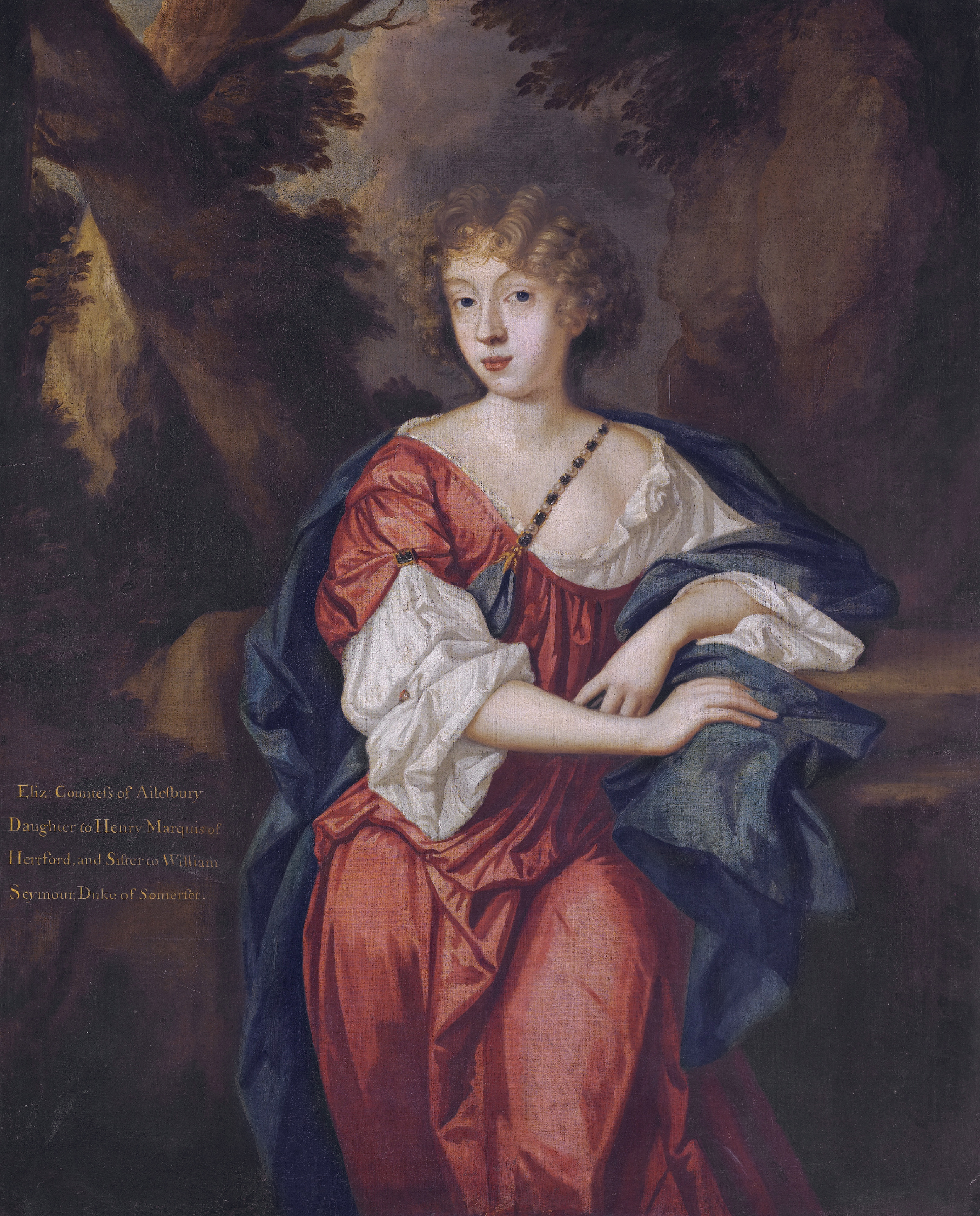
Elizabeth, Countess of Ailesbury (1656–1697)

He married, firstly, Lady Elizabeth Seymour, daughter of Henry Seymour, Lord Beauchamp and Mary Capell and granddaughter of William Seymour, 2nd Duke of Somerset, on 31 August 1676. She died in 1697 in premature childbirth, apparently brought on by a false report that her husband had been executed for treason. They had three children:

- Robert Bruce, Lord Bruce (1679–1685)
- Charles Bruce, 4th Earl of Elgin (1682–1747)
- Lady Elizabeth Bruce (1689–1745), married George Brudenell, 3rd Earl of Cardigan and had issue. His descendants included Diana, Princess of Wales.

He married, secondly, Charlotte d'Argenteau, comtesse d'Esneux, in Brussels (Church of St. James on Coudenberg) on 27 April 1700. They had one daughter:

- Lady Marie Thérèse Bruce (1704–1736), married Prince Maximilian Emmanuel of Hornes and had issue.

== Later life ==
He was one of only four peers who continued to support James II after the Prince of Orange embarked for England. On 18 December 1688 he accompanied King James to Rochester when he fled London. Elgin himself chose to remain in England; he was prepared in the short term to offer his support to the new regime, although his loyalty to it was always deeply suspect.

Coat of arms of the Earl of Elgin

In May 1695, Lord Ailesbury was accused, almost certainly with good reason, of having conspired to plan the restoration of King James II and in February 1696 he was imprisoned in the Tower of London, but admitted to bail a year later and allowed to leave England for Brussels. After more than 40 years in exile, he died in Brussels and was buried there.

Some historians have accused him of double-dealing in swearing allegiance to William III while plotting the restoration of James; others argue that his true loyalty was to the institution of the monarchy, and that he supported whichever monarch seemed best fitted to rule at any given time. William III clearly did not regard him as a dangerous character, as shown by the fact that he was left in peace once he fled from England; he was fortunate in having a great many friends and very few enemies. It seems that from about 1710 he was free to return to England, but he was by then happily settled in Brussels, where he had made a second marriage for love to Charlotte, comtesse d'Esneux, and, since he was able to draw at least part of the revenue from his English estates, he had no pressing need and no apparent desire to return home.

== Character ==
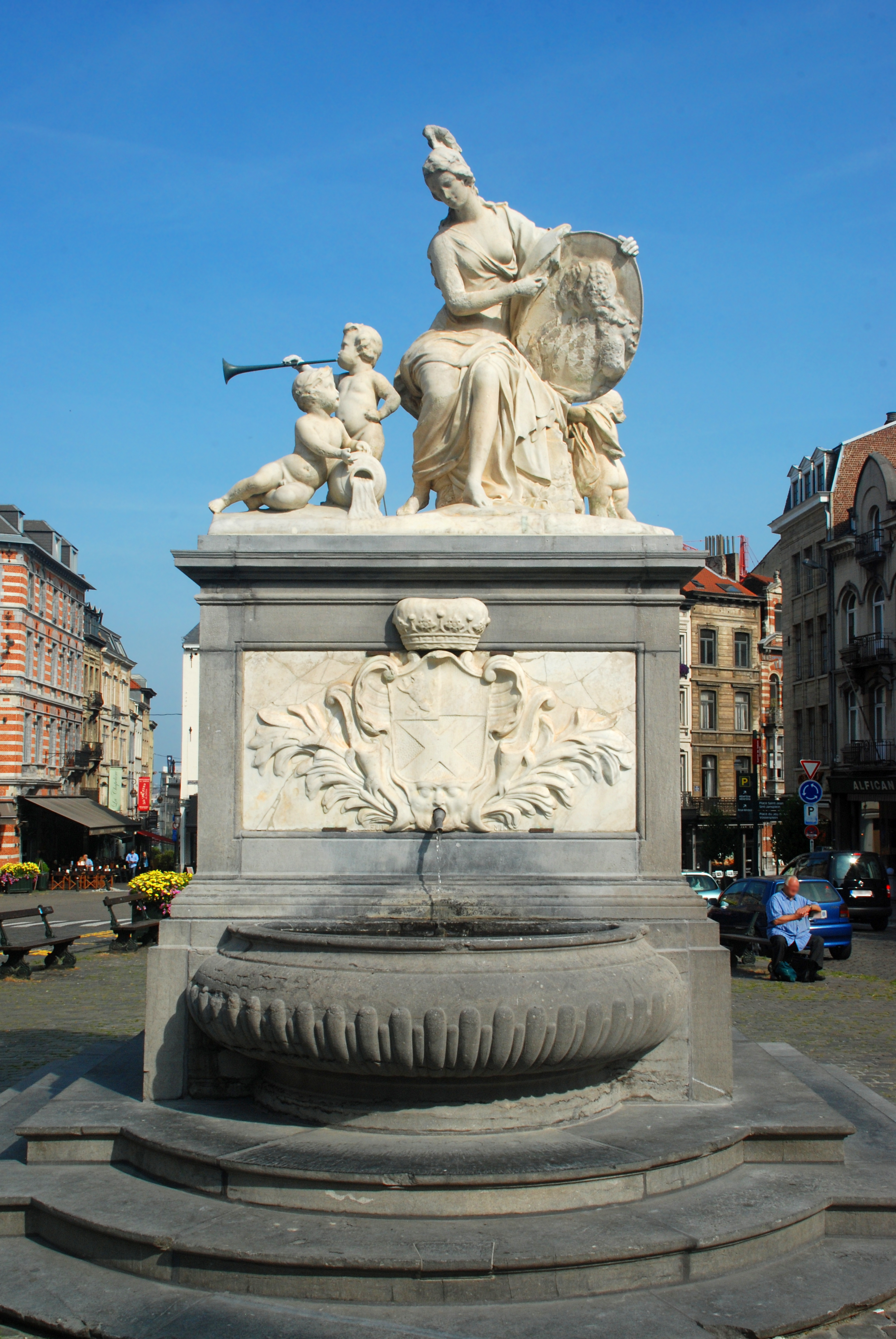
The Fountain of Minerva that Thomas Bruce offered to the Brussels people as a sign of gratitude, 1751 (Brussels, Square du Grand Sablon)

Ailesbury seems to have been almost universally liked even by his political opponents, having a reputation for honesty, decency and fair dealing. Charles II was clearly fond of him and confided in him to a degree unusual for such a secretive man; James II also liked him, and Louis XIV regarded him as almost the only British nobleman who was not motivated purely by self-interest. Though he changed allegiance himself he had no patience with time-servers: he detested Sunderland (while admitting that he was good company) and in 1689 told his cousin Danby that for his treachery to James II he deserved to "be knocked on the head".

== Memoirs ==
Ailesbury devoted many years to writing his Memoirs, which were not published until 1890. Historians have praised them highly, particularly for the vivid portraits of the leading figures in British life, including James II, William III, Danby, Sunderland, Lauderdale and Halifax. Perhaps the most striking feature of the memoirs is the author's absolute devotion to Charles II: "my good and gracious master, the best that ever reigned over us".

== Notes ==
Parliament of England
Preceded by Thomas Bennet; Edward Goddard	Member of Parliament for Marlborough; 1679–1685; Served alongside: Thomas Bennet	Succeeded by Sir John Ernle; Sir George Willoughby
Preceded by Thomas Thynne; Sir Walter St John	Member of Parliament for Wiltshire; 1685; Served alongside: Viscount Cornbury	Succeeded by Viscount Cornbury; Sir Thomas Mompesson
Honorary titles
Preceded by The Earl of Ailesbury	Lord Lieutenant of Bedfordshire; 1685–1689	Succeeded by The Earl of Bedford
Preceded by The Earl of Ailesbury	Lord Lieutenant of Huntingdonshire (in the absence of The Earl of Sandwich); 1685–1689	Succeeded by The Earl of Manchester
Peerage of England
Preceded by Robert Bruce	Earl of Ailesbury; 1685–1741	Succeeded by Charles Bruce
Preceded by Robert Bruce	Baron Bruce of Whorlton (descended by acceleration); 1685–1711	Succeeded by Charles Bruce
Peerage of Scotland
Preceded by Robert Bruce	Earl of Elgin; 1685–1741	Succeeded by Charles Bruce
