= Maximilien Emmanuel, Prince of Hornes =

Maximilian Emanuel
- Prince of Hornes
- Born: 31 August 1695; Brussels
- Died: 12 January 1763 (aged 67); Brussels
- Spouses: Lady Marie Thérèse Charlotte Bruce; Princess Henriette of Salm-Kyrburg; Princess Marie Albertine of Gavre
- Issue: Princess Maria Thérèse of Hornes; Princess Elisabeth of Hornes
- Father: Philippe Emanuel, 2nd Prince of Hornes
- Mother: Princess Marie Anne Antoinette of Ligne

Maximilian Emanuel, 3rd Prince of Hornes, Count of Baucignies and of Solre-le-Château (31 August 1695, Brussels – 12 January 1763, Brussels), was a nobleman and Grand Huntsman of Brabant. His father was Philippe Emanuel, 2nd Prince of Hornes, and his mother was Princess Marie Anne Antoinette of Ligne.

He was made a Knight of the Austrian Golden Fleece in 1749. The Principality of Hornes was surrounded by the Bishopric of Liège.

== Career at court ==
- Grandee of Spain, 1st Class.
- Grand Huntsman of Brabant (1750–1763).
- Grand Esquier of the Empress.
- Grand Master of the Imperial Household (1745–1763).

== Marriages and issue ==
He first married Lady Marie Thérèse Charlotte Bruce (1697–1736), daughter of Thomas Bruce, 2nd Earl of Ailesbury, an English nobleman who lived in exile in Brussels for much of his life, and his second wife Charlotte d'Argenteau, comtesse d'Esneux.

Their children were:

1) Marie-Thérèse-Josepha de Hornes (19 October 1725 – 19 June 1783):
married Prince Philip Joseph of Salm-Kyrburg. They had 10 children:

  - Marie Maximiliane Louise (1744–1790), married Jean Bretagne Charles de La Trémoille, Duc de Thouars
  - Frederick III (1745–1794), later prince of Salm-Kyrburg, executed in the French Revolution
  - Auguste Frederica (1747–1822), married Anne Emmanuel, 8th Duke of Croÿ
  - Charles Augustus (1750)
  - Marie Louise (1753)
  - Louis Joseph Ferdinand (1753–1774)
  - Elisabeth Claudine (1756–1757)
  - Amalie Zephyrine (1760–1841), married Anton Aloys, Prince of Hohenzollern-Sigmaringen
    - Karl, Prince of Hohenzollern-Sigmaringen x Marie Antoinette Murat
      - Karl Anton, Prince of Hohenzollern
        - Princess Marie of Hohenzollern-Sigmaringen x Prince Philippe, Count of Flanders
          - Albert I, King of the Belgians
  - Charles Albert Henry (1761)
  - Maurice Gustav Adolf (1761–1813), married Countess Christiane von Wartenberg

2) Elisabeth-Philippine-Claude de Hornes (1733–1826):
married Prince Gustav Adolf of Stolberg-Gedern. They had four daughters:

  - Louise Maximiliane (1752–1824), married Charles Edward Stuart "The Young Pretender"
  - Caroline Auguste (1755–1828), married firstly Carlos Fitz-James Stuart, 4th Duke of Liria and Jérica and secondly Domingo Duque de Castelfranco
  - Franziska Claudia (1756–1836), married Nicolas Antoine Conte d'Arberg de Valengin
  - Therese Gustavine (1757–1837), nun in Mons

Following his first wife's death, he was married to Princess Henriette Thérèse Norbertine of Salm-Kyrburg (1711–1751) and then, after her death, to Princess Marie Albertine de Gavre (1735–1797), daughter of Charles I Alexandre, 1st Prince de Gavre.
