= Bancigny =

- Commune
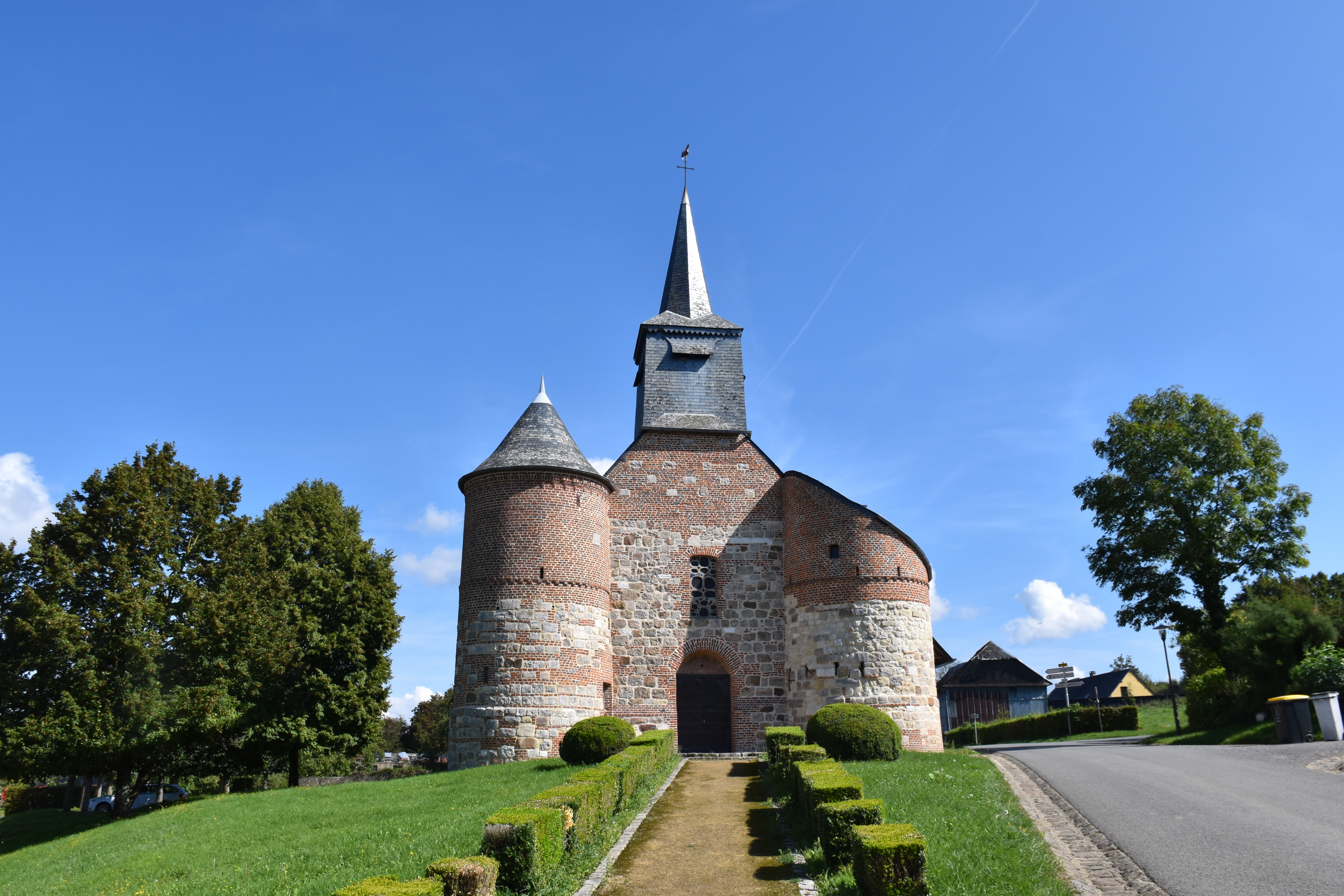
- Location of Bancigny
- Location within France Location within Hauts-de-France
- Coordinates: 49°48′05″N 4°02′04″E
- Country: France
- Region: Hauts-de-France
- Department: Aisne
- Arrondissement: Vervins
- Canton: Vervins
- Intercommunality: Thiérache du Centre

Government
  - Mayor (2026–32): Christine Foulon
- Area^{1}: 3.32 km^{2} (1.28 sq mi)
- Elevation: 170 m (560 ft)
- Highest elevation: 216 m (709 ft)
- Lowest elevation: 147 m (482 ft)
- Population (2023): 26
  - Density: 7.8/km^{2} (20/sq mi)
- Time zone: UTC+01:00 (CET)
  - Summer (DST): UTC+02:00 (CEST)
- INSEE/Postal code: 02044 /02140
- ^{1} French Land Register data, which excludes lakes, ponds, glaciers > 1 km^{2} (0.386 sq mi or 247 acres) and river estuaries.

Bancigny (French pronunciation: [bɑ̃siɲi]) is a commune in the department of Aisne in the Hauts-de-France region of northern France.

== Geography ==
Location of the commune of Bancigny in the canton of Vervins

Bancigny is located some 50 km northeast of Laon and 12 km east by southeast of Vervins. It can be accessed by the D747 road from Plomion in the northwest which then continues east to Jeantes. There is also country road access from west, south, and north. Apart from the village the commune is entirely farmland with no other villages or hamlets.

The commune is traversed by the Huteau stream from east to west north of the village and bordering the Mill Farm northwest of the village.

== History ==
Bancigny was called Bancegnies on a map dated 1205 and at that time the area was a lordship. The Bancigny area was made a County in 1590. During the French Revolution, Bancigny became a commune in the Canton of Plomion in the district of Vervins. In 1801 the commune was transferred to the Canton of Vervins in the Arrondissement of Vervins.

== Population ==
Historical population
Year	Pop.	±% p.a.
1968	69	—
1975	59	−2.21%
1982	49	−2.62%
1990	39	−2.81%
1999	32	−2.17%
2007	22	−4.58%
2012	30	+6.40%
2017	26	−2.82%
2023	26	+0.00%
Source: INSEE

== Culture and heritage ==
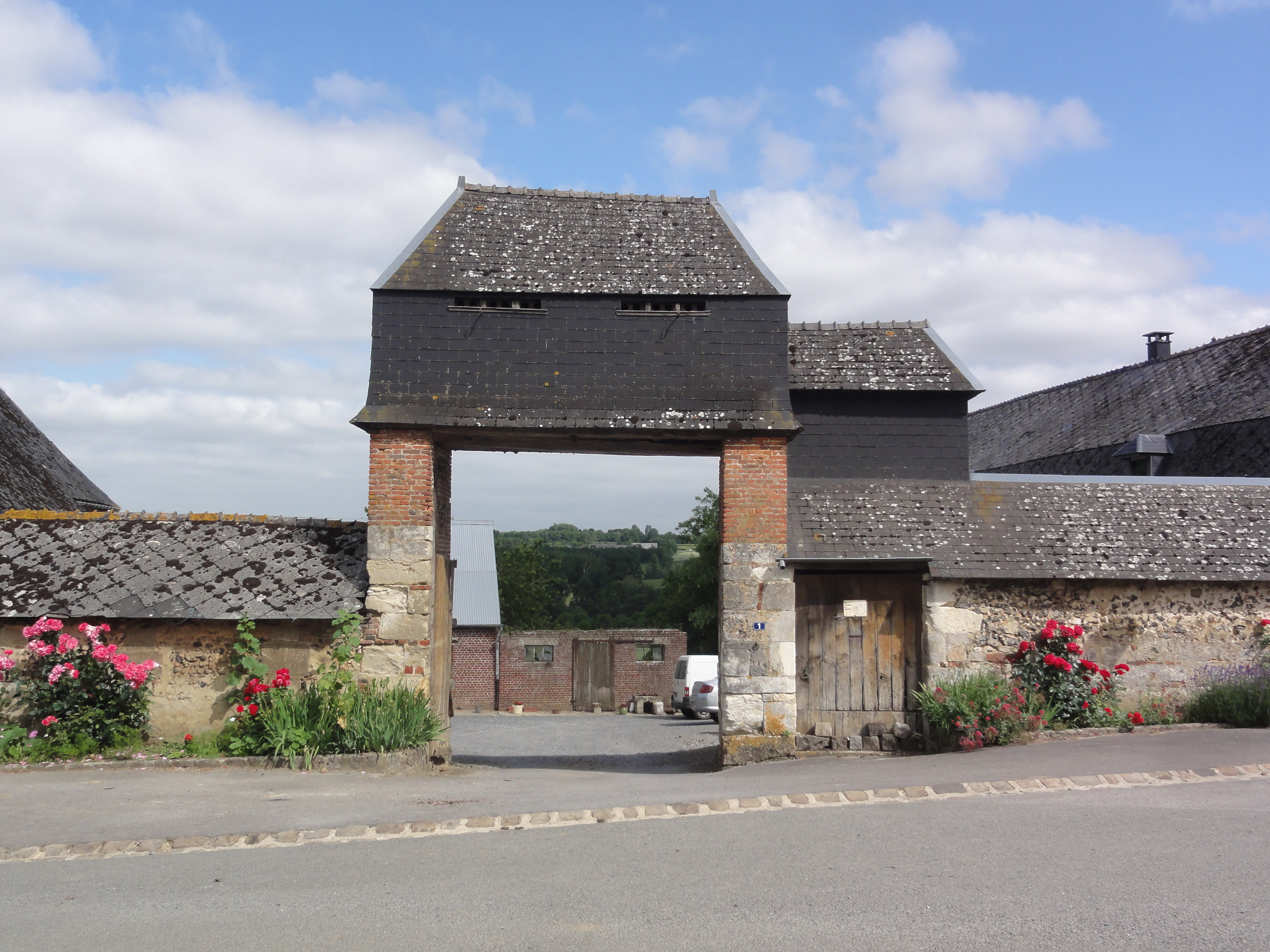
Entrance to a Farmhouse with a dovecote

=== Civil heritage ===
The commune has a number of buildings and structures that are registered as historical monuments:

- A Farmhouse at Place de l'Eglise (18th century)
- A Farmhouse at 2 Route de Jeantes (18th century)
- A Farmhouse at Le Moulin (1808)
- A Mill and Farmhouse at Le Moulin (1925)

=== Religious heritage ===
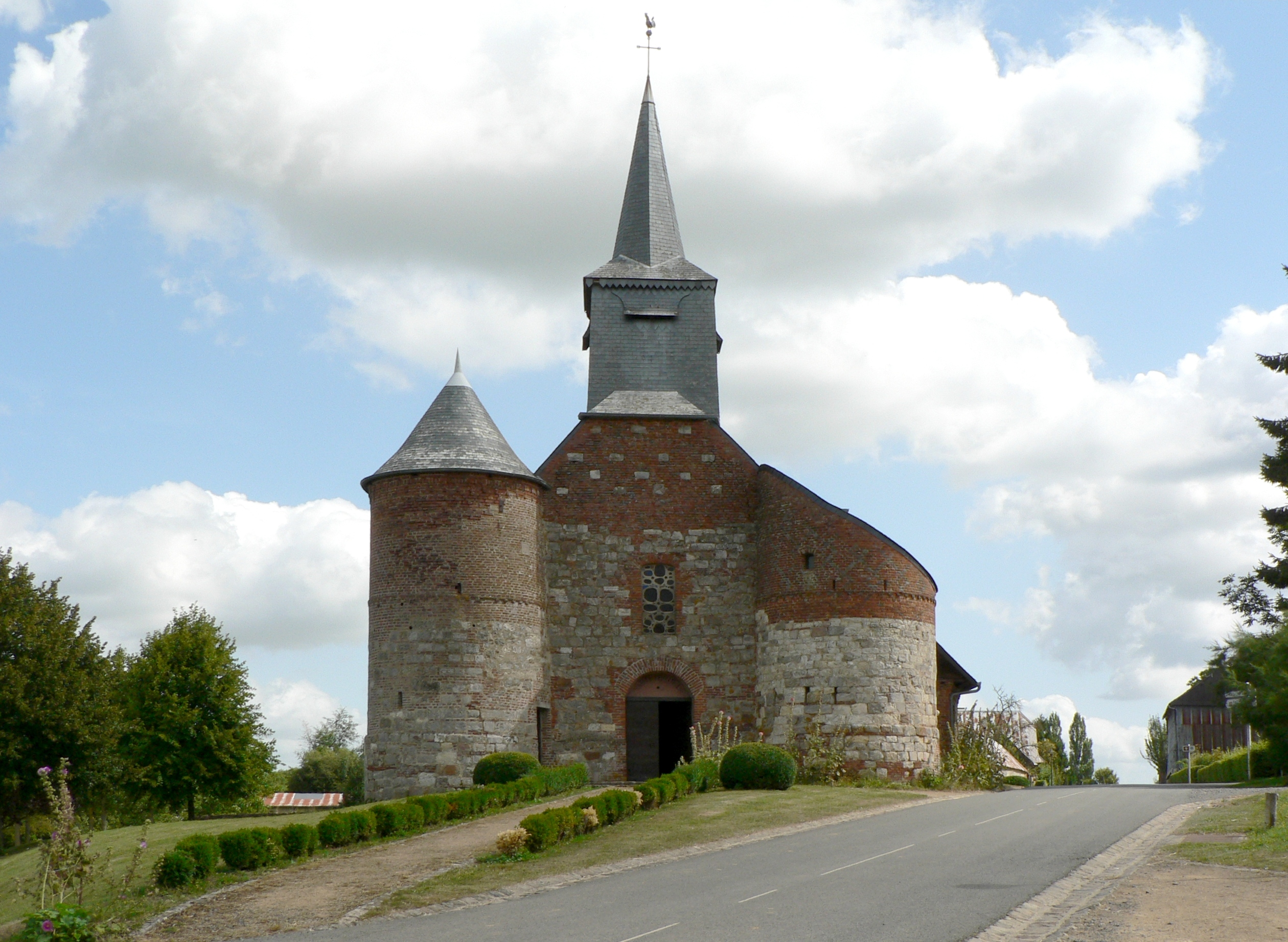
The Church of Saint Nicolas showing how the symmetry of the towers has been lost

The commune has several religious buildings and structures that are registered as historical monuments:

- The Fortified Church of Saint-Nicolas (16th century). The symmetry of the two towers can no longer be seen as the upper part of each defence tower was leveled in the period 1900-1905 as evidenced by postcards of the period. The Church contains two items that are registered as historical objects:
  - A Group Sculpture: Christ on the Cross between the Virgin and Saint John (16th century)
  - A Baptismal font (12th century)
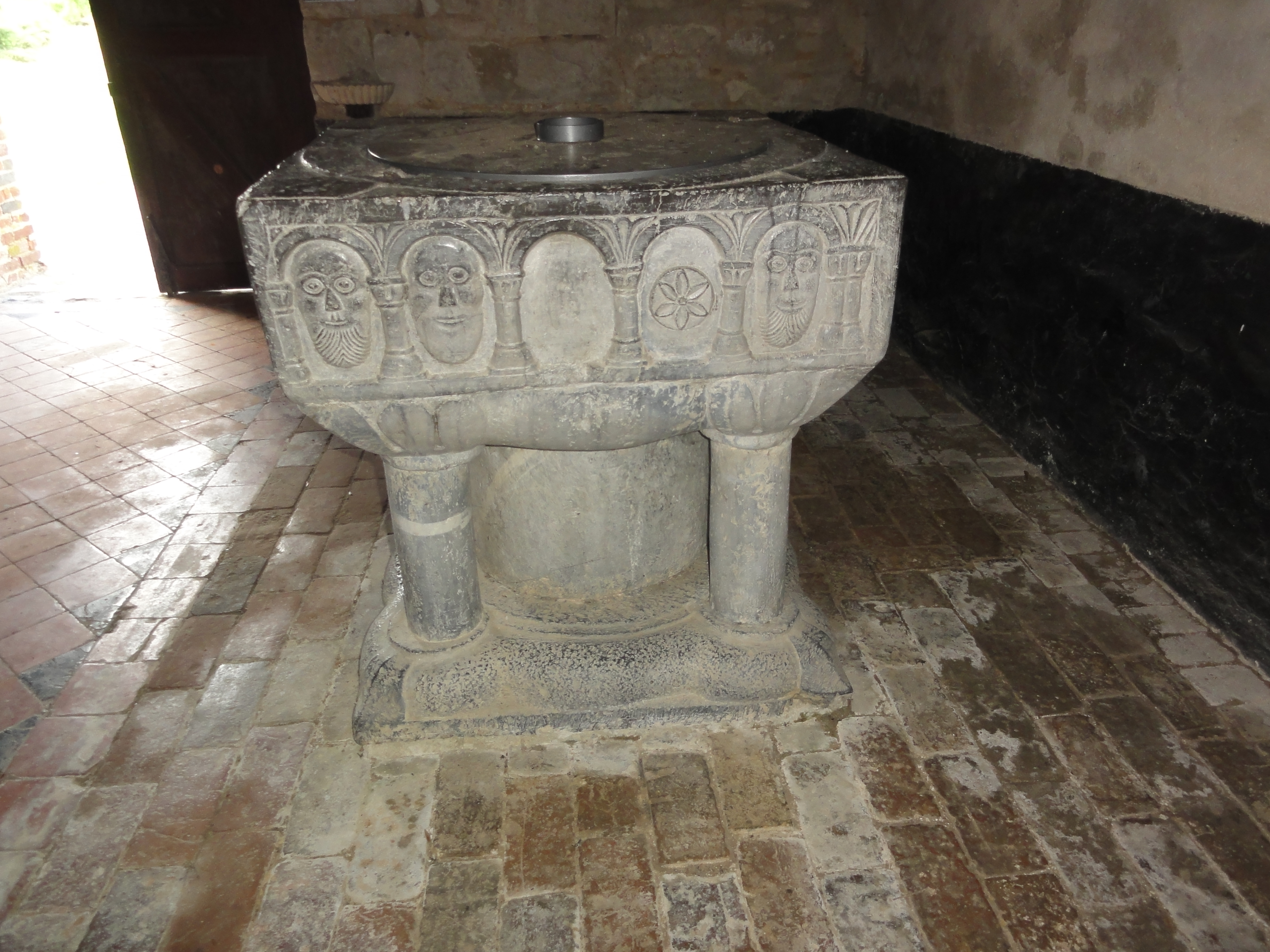
The Baptismal font

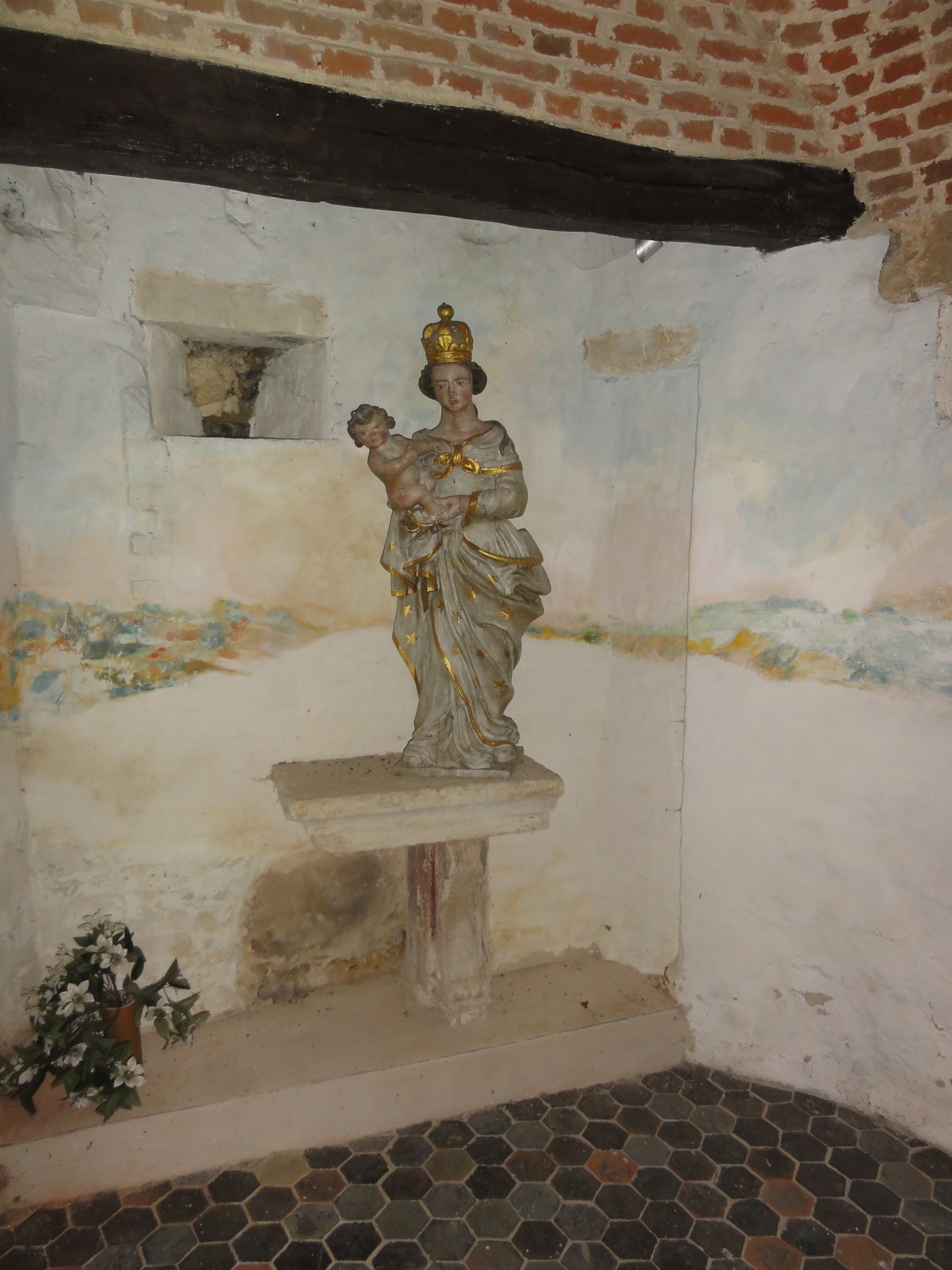
The Statue of the Virgin

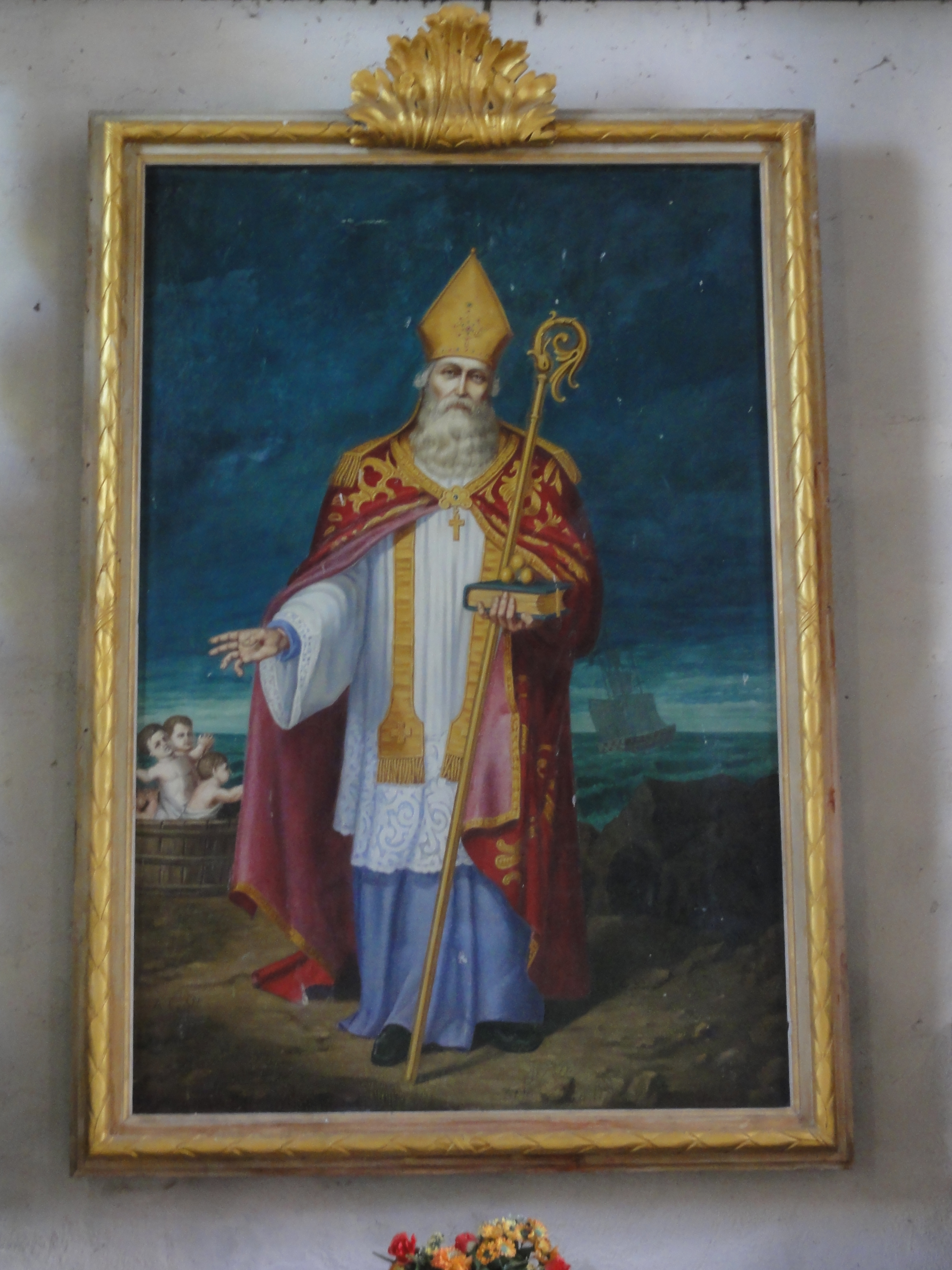
A Painting of Saint Nicolas

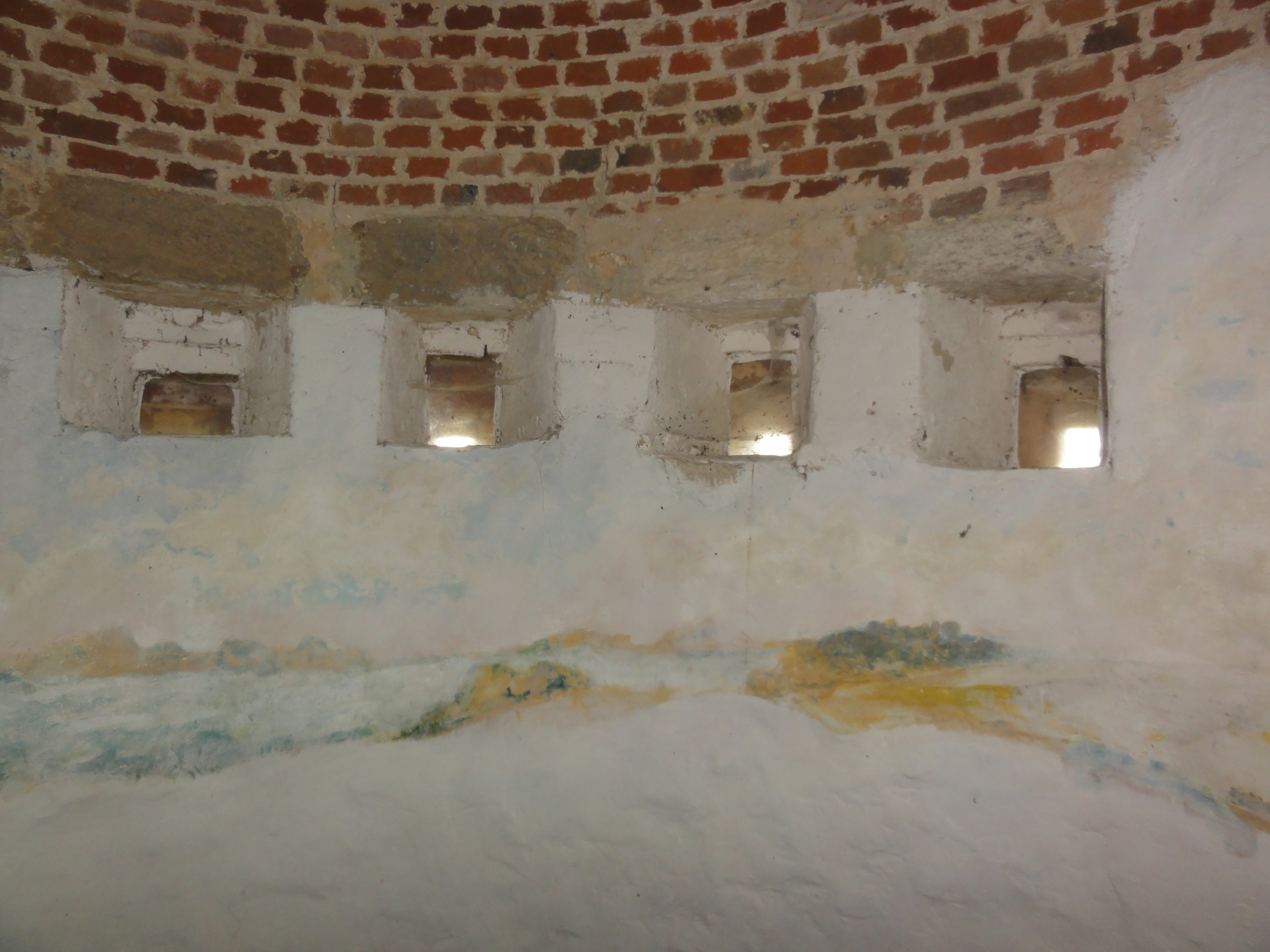
Inside the Tower

== See also ==
- Communes of the Aisne department
