= Philippe Emmanuel, Prince of Hornes =

Philippe Emanuel, Prince of Hornes, Prince of Overisque, Count of Solre-le-Château (31 August 1661 in Condé – 14 October 1718 in Bailleul, Somme), was the son of Eugene Maximilian, Prince of Hornes and Princess Anne Marie Jeanne of Croÿ. He married Princess Marie Anne Antoninette of Ligne.

His domain, the Principality of Hornes, was a part of the Holy Roman Empire in what is now modern France, Germany, Belgium and the Netherlands. It was surrounded by the Principality of Liège. It had 3 enclaves, which were in France.

== Issue ==
He married Princess Marie Anne Antoinette of Ligne, daughter of Henri, 4th Prince of Ligne, and had six children. They were:

Name	Birth	Death
Maximilian Emanuel, Prince of Hornes	31 August 1695	1 December 1763
Prince Antoine Joseph of Hornes	20 November 1698	March 26, 1720
Marie Josephe of Hornes, Princess de Ghistelles, married to Philippe Alexandre de Ghistelles	14 January 1704	July 11, 1738
stillborn	1705	1705
Princess Marie Madeleine Marguerite Augusta of Hornes	May 13, 1710	3 December 1733
Prince Philippe Max of Hornes	ca. 1698	March 26, 1720
