= Prince Anton of Hohenzollern-Sigmaringen =

German royal and soldier

Prince Anton
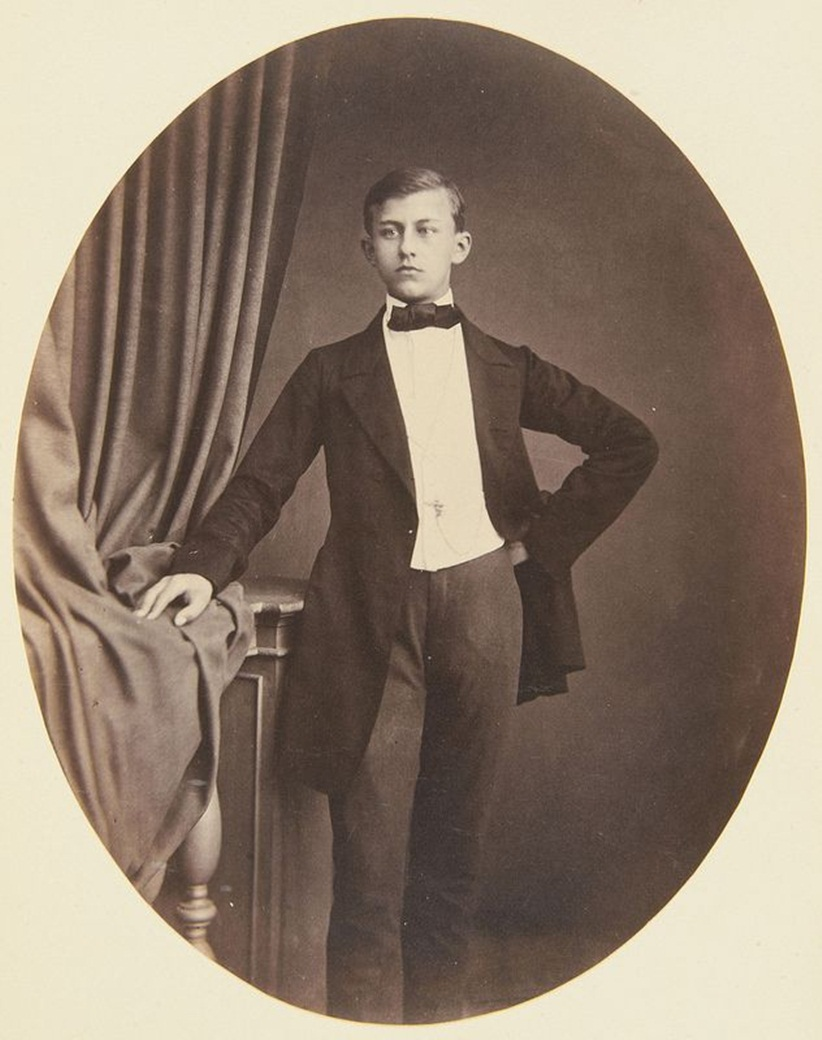
- Prince Anton in 1858
- Born: 7 October 1841; Sigmaringen
- Died: 6 August 1866 (aged 24); Dvůr Králové nad Labem
- House: Hohenzollern-Sigmaringen
- Father: Charles Anthony, Prince of Hohenzollern
- Mother: Princess Josephine of Baden

Prince Anton of Hohenzollern-Sigmaringen (7 October 1841 – 6 August 1866) was a German prince and soldier. He was a member of the Princely House of Hohenzollern-Sigmaringen. During the Austro-Prussian War, while serving with the First Foot Guards, Prince Anton was mortally wounded at Königgrätz and died 33 days later of his wounds.

== Family ==
His father was Charles Anthony, Prince of Hohenzollern, and his mother was Princess Josephine of Baden, daughter of Grand Duke Charles of Baden. Anton had several siblings, including:

- Leopold (1835–1905)
- Stephanie (1837–1859)
- Karl (1839–1914)
- Friedrich (1843–1904)
- Maria Luise (1845–1912)

He was very close to his brother, Prince Frederick of Hohenzollern-Sigmaringen.

== Ancestry ==
Ancestors of Prince Anton of Hohenzollern-Sigmaringen

8. Anton Aloys, Prince of Hohenzollern-Sigmaringen
4. Karl, Prince of Hohenzollern-Sigmaringen
9. Princess Amalie Zephyrine of Salm-Kyrburg
2. Karl Anton, Prince of Hohenzollern
10. Pierre Murat
5. Marie Antoinette Murat
11. Louise d'Astorg
1. Prince Anton of Hohenzollern-Sigmaringen
12. Charles Louis, Hereditary Prince of Baden
6. Charles, Grand Duke of Baden
13. Princess Amalie of Hesse-Darmstadt
3. Princess Josephine of Baden
14. Claude de Beauharnais, comte des Roches-Baritaud
7. Stéphanie de Beauharnais
15. Adrienne de Lézay-Marnézia
