= Karl Anton, Prince of Hohenzollern (born 1811) =

Prince of Hohenzollern-Sigmaringen (1811–1885)

Karl Anton
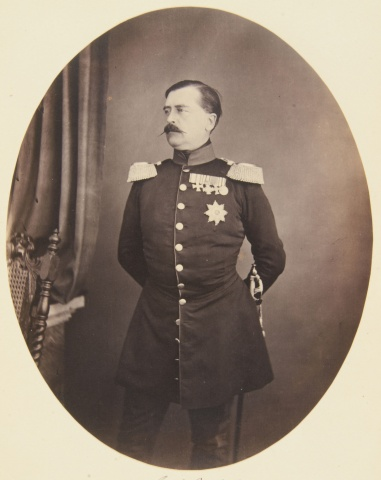
- Karl Anton in 1858

Prince of Hohenzollern-Sigmaringen
- Reign: 27 August 1848 – 7 December 1849
- Predecessor: Karl
- Successor: Annexed by Prussia

Prince of Hohenzollern
- Tenure: 3 September 1869 – 2 June 1885
- Successor: Leopold

Minister President of Prussia
- Tenure: 6 November 1858 – 12 March 1862
- Predecessor: Otto Theodor von Manteuffel
- Successor: Adolf of Hohenlohe-Ingelfingen
- Born: 7 September 1811; Krauchenwies, Hohenzollern-Sigmaringen
- Died: 2 June 1885 (aged 73); Sigmaringen, German Empire
- Spouse: Princess Josephine of Baden (m. 1834)
- Issue: Leopold, Prince of Hohenzollern; Stephanie, Queen of Portugal; Carol I, King of Romania; Prince Anton; Prince Frederick; Princess Marie, Countess of Flanders
Names
- German: Karl Anton Joachim Zephyrinus Friedrich Meinrad
- House: Hohenzollern
- Father: Karl, Prince of Hohenzollern-Sigmaringen
- Mother: Marie Antoinette Murat

Karl Anton, Prince of Hohenzollern-Sigmaringen (German: Karl Anton Joachim Zephyrinus Friedrich Meinrad Fürst von Hohenzollern-Sigmaringen; 7 September 1811 – 2 June 1885) was the last reigning prince of Hohenzollern-Sigmaringen before the territory was annexed by the Kingdom of Prussia in 1849. Afterwards, he continued to be titular prince of his house and – with the death of the last prince of Hohenzollern-Hechingen in 1869 – of the entire Swabian branch of the House of Hohenzollern. He served as Minister President of Prussia from 1858 to 1862, the only Hohenzollern prince to hold that post. His second son, Karl, became king of Romania. The offer of the throne of Spain to his eldest son, Leopold, was one of the causes of the Franco-Prussian War, which led to the unification of Germany and the creation of the German Empire.

== Family and studies ==
Karl Anton was born at Krauchenwies Castle in Sigmaringen, the second child of Karl, Prince of Hohenzollern-Sigmaringen (1785–1853) and the French princess Marie Antoinette Murat (1793–1847). Karl Anton studied law in Geneva, at the Universities of Tübingen and Göttingen, and at the Humboldt University of Berlin. After finishing school he was active in the Estates Assembly (a form of parliament) and in the administration of Hohenzollern-Sigmaringen.

On 31 October 1834 he married Princess Josephine of Baden (21 October 1813 – 19 June 1900), daughter of Grand Duke Carl of Baden. They had six children:

- Leopold (22 September 1835 – 8 June 1905) – was offered but did not take the throne of Spain
- Stephanie (15 July 1837 – 17 July 1859) – married Peter V of Portugal
- Karl (20 April 1839 – 10 October 1914) – King of Romania
- Anton (7 October 1841 – 6 August 1866) – died in battle during the Austro-Prussian War
- Friedrich (25 June 1843 – 2 December 1904)
- Marie (17 November 1845 – 26 November 1912) – married Prince Philippe of Belgium and became the mother of King Albert I of Belgium.

== Princeship and abdication ==
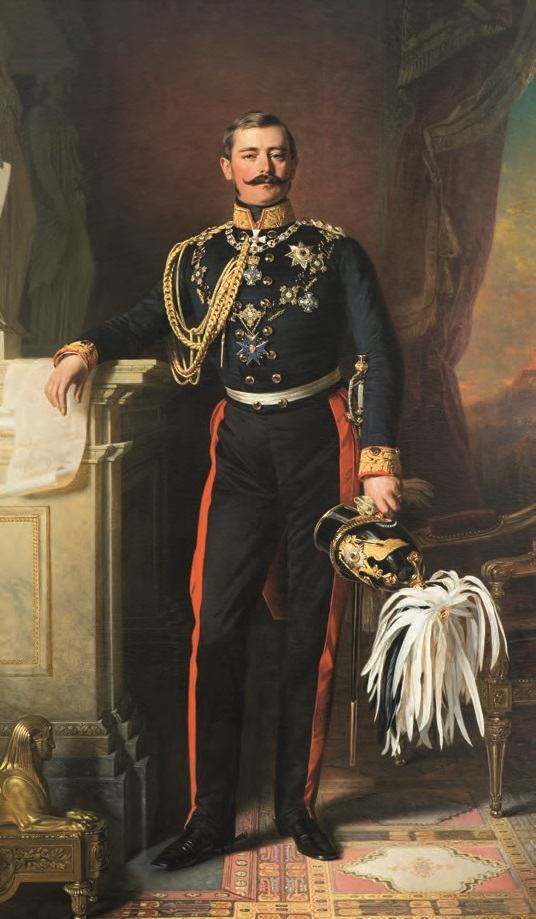
Portrait of Karl Anton by Richard Lauchert, 1852

On 27 August 1848, in the face of the events surrounding the German revolutions of 1848–1849, Prince Karl resigned in favor of his son, Karl Anton, who originally intended to renounce the sovereign rights of the state. He negotiated with the provisional government (Provisorische Zentralgewalt) of the Frankfurt Parliament, but the negotiations did not lead to any results. Within the principality, the revolutionary movement became increasingly radicalized, leading to a dispute with the estates over the princely domains that forced Karl Anton to temporarily leave Hohenzollern-Sigmaringen.

In the spring of 1849, the situation in Sigmaringen again came to a head. Prince Karl Anton had to consent to the new Frankfurt Constitution that attempted to set up a German constitutional monarchy under King Frederick Wilhelm IV of Prussia. On 3 June a people's assembly was held calling for the unification of the military and the citizen army, the free election of officers, and the transfer of the princely domains to the state. At Karl Anton's request, Prussian troops entered Sigmaringen and all of Hohenzollern on 3 August.

Beginning in the spring of 1848, Karl Anton conducted secret negotiations with Frederick William IV on the annexation of the principality to the Kingdom of Prussia. On 7 December 1849, Prince Karl Anton signed the state treaty with Prussia, and the solemn handover of the principality took place on 6 April 1850.

After abdicating as sovereign in favor of Prussia, Karl Anton became commander of the 14th Division of the Prussian Army on 15 April 1852. He lived with his family in Jägerhof Palace in Düsseldorf. On 22 March 1853 he was promoted to lieutenant general. At the beginning of the Crimean War, he was sent as an envoy to Paris to try to prevent the anti-Russian coalition that France and Great Britain ultimately formed.

== Minister President of Prussia ==
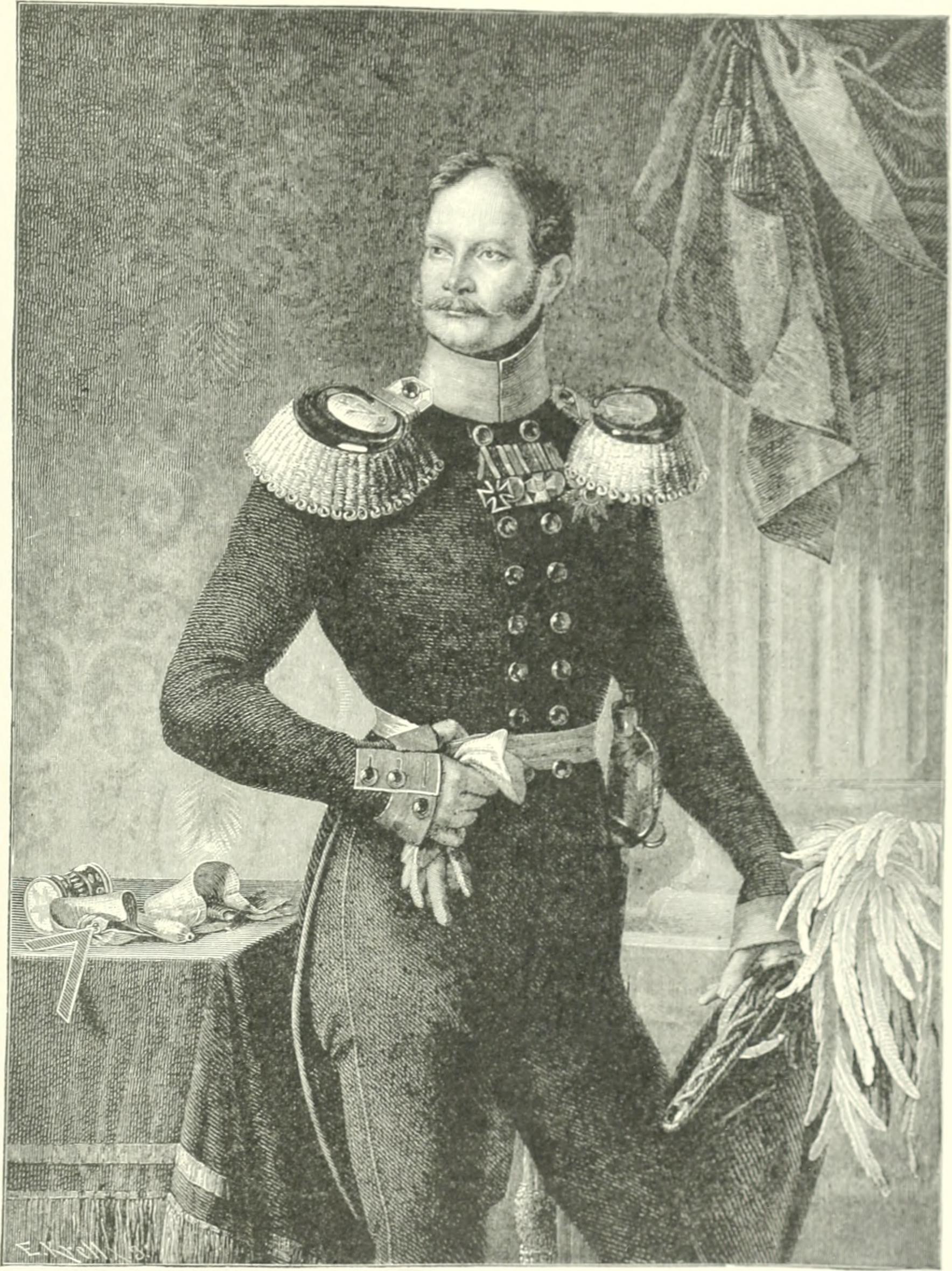
Prince Wilhelm of Prussia (later Emperor Wilhelm I) in about 1840. He appointed Karl Anton Minister President in 1858.

Karl Anton had good relations with Prince Wilhelm of Prussia. After Wilhelm assumed the regency on 5 November 1858, he entrusted Karl Anton with office of Minister President of Prussia and asked him to submit his proposal for building a ministry. The appointment made him head of the government during the "New Era", a period of attempted reform following the conservative reaction against the 1848 revolutions.

Politically Karl Anton was close to the moderate liberalism of the Wochenblatt Party, an association of Prussian liberal-conservative politicians led by August von Bethmann-Hollweg. In domestic politics, Karl Anton attempted to implement liberal reforms and initially cooperated with the liberals who were in the majority in the Prussian House of Representatives. In the conflict over military reform that pitted King Wilhelm I against the parliament, Karl Anton supported the King and the plans of Minister of War Albrecht von Roon, but he also advocated a greater opening of an officer's career to the middle classes. In foreign policy, he supported the liberal reform plans that had the goal of unifying the German states. The European crisis resulting from the Second Italian War of Independence caused his plans for German policy to fail.

Between 22 November 1858 and 28 June 1860, Karl Anton served as commanding general of the VII Army Corps; on 31 May 1859 he attained the rank of general of infantry.

The parliamentary election of 1861 ended with the victory of the German Progress Party, which rejected Roon's military plans. As a result, Karl Anton lost political support in the chamber. Within the cabinet, he had difficulty asserting himself between the liberal members around August von der Heydt and the conservatives around Roon. His time as Minister President ended on 12 March 1862.

== Final years ==
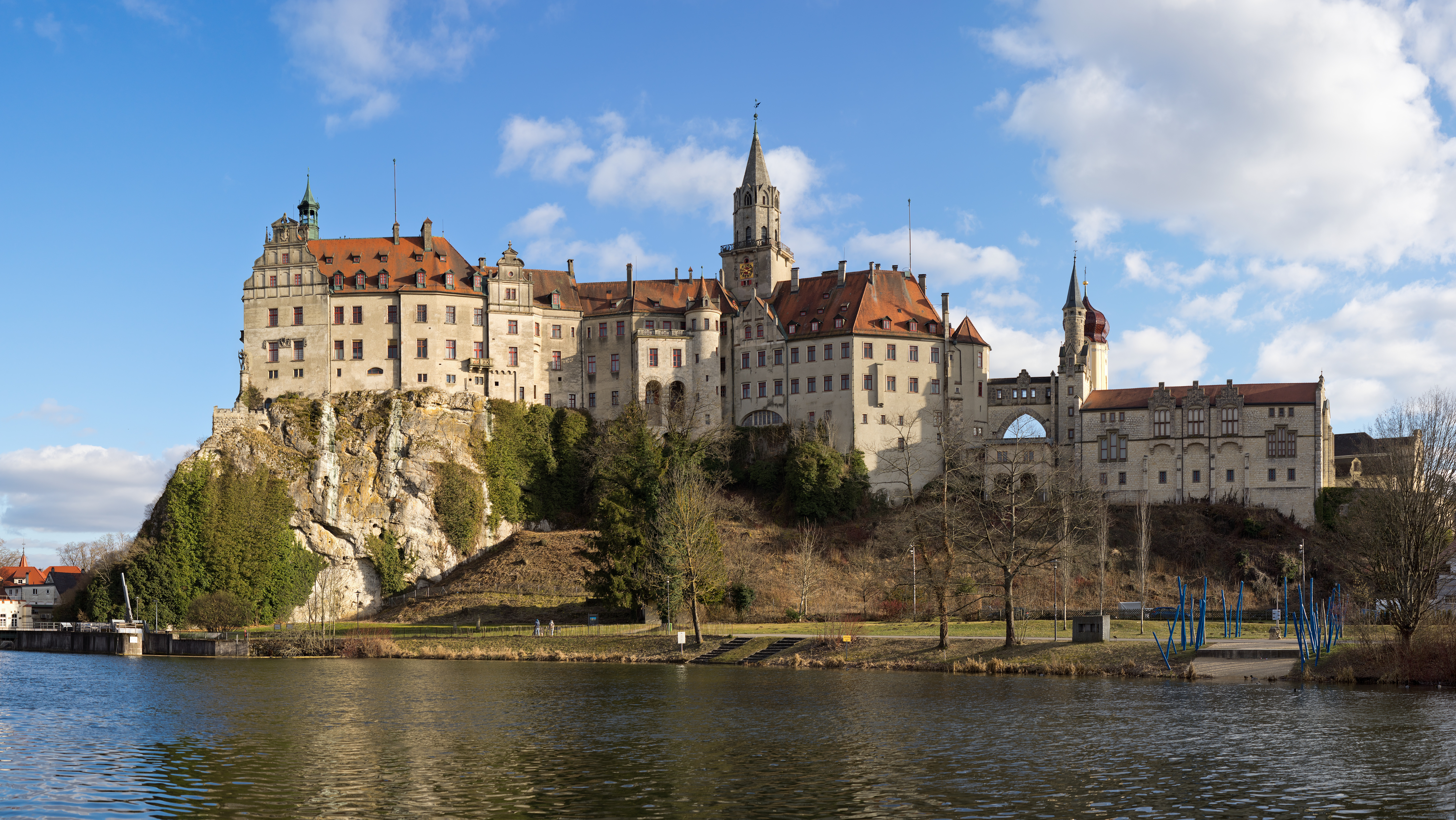
Sigmaringen Castle on the Danube River, the ancestral home of the princes of Sigmaringen-Hohenzollern

After leaving the Prussian government, Karl Anton largely resigned from active politics and focused on his role as head of the Catholic branch of the Hohenzollern family, a position that was accentuated by the extinction of the Hohenzollern-Hechingen line in 1869. In 1866 his son Karl was elected Prince of Romania. When in February 1870 his other son Leopold was offered the Spanish throne, German Chancellor Otto von Bismarck urged Karl Anton to accept the offer, which he did after a period of hesitation. In view of his kinship with the French houses of Murat and Bonaparte, the approval of the French emperor Napoleon III seemed possible. When the candidacy threatened to ignite a European crisis, Karl Anton withdrew his son's name on 12 July 1870, but it was not enough to prevent the Franco-Prussian War of 1870/71. The Ems Dispatch, which incited France to declare war on Prussia, was issued one day later. During the war, Karl Anton did not hold a frontline command. He was military governor of the Rhine Province and the Province of Westphalia, with the rank of commanding general.

In 1871 Sigmaringen again became Karl Anton's permanent residence. He and his wife celebrated their golden wedding anniversary in 1884 with a thirteen-course meal. The prince was an avid hunter and a collector of art, books and guns, as well as an enthusiastic amateur antiquarian who offered guided tours of his collections and art treasures in Sigmaringen Castle. He spent the last years of his life burdened by a paralysis of the legs.

Karl Anton died on 2 June 1885.

== Honors ==
German decorations

- Hohenzollern: Joint Founder of the Princely House Order of Hohenzollern, 5 December 1841
- Ascanian duchies: Grand Cross of Albert the Bear, 17 April 1860
- Baden:
  - Grand Cross of the House Order of Fidelity, 1831
  - Grand Cross of the Zähringer Lion, 1831
- Kingdom of Bavaria: Knight of St. Hubert, 1858
- (Saxe-Coburg and Gotha) (Duchy of Saxe-Altenburg) (Saxe-Meiningen) Ernestine duchies: Grand Cross of the Saxe-Ernestine House Order, May 1835
- Grand Duchy of Hesse: Grand Cross of the Ludwig Order, 25 December 1868
- Oldenburg: Grand Cross of the Order of Duke Peter Friedrich Ludwig, with Golden Crown, 18 September 1861
- Saxe-Weimar-Eisenach: Grand Cross of the White Falcon, 1 March 1858
- Kingdom of Saxony: Knight of the Rue Crown
- Württemberg:
  - Grand Cross of the Friedrich Order, 1832
  - Grand Cross of the Württemberg Crown, 1845
- Kingdom of Prussia:
  - Knight of the Black Eagle, 18 January 1849; with Collar, 18 January 1851 ; Diamonds 21 October 1884
  - Grand Commander's Cross of the Royal House Order of Hohenzollern, 1851; with Star, 18 October 1861
  - Grand Cross of the Red Eagle, with Oak Leaves, 18 October 1861; with Swords, 1864
  - Pour le Mérite (military), 20 September 1866
  - Military Service Cross

Foreign decorations

- Austrian Empire:
  - Grand Cross of the Imperial Order of Leopold, 1853
  - Grand Cross of the Royal Hungarian Order of St. Stephen, 1859
  - Knight of the Golden Fleece, 1860
  - Military Merit Cross, with War Decoration
- Belgium: Grand Cordon of the Order of Leopold (military), 30 June 1869
- Empire of Brazil: Grand Cross of the Southern Cross
- French Empire: Grand Cross of the Legion of Honour, 28 June 1860
- Kingdom of Greece: Grand Cross of the Redeemer
- Monaco: Grand Cross of St. Charles, 26 September 1882
- Kingdom of Portugal: Grand Cross of the Tower and Sword
- United Principalities of Romania:
  - Grand Cross of the Star of Romania
  - Grand Cross of the Crown of Romania
- Russian Empire:
  - Knight of St. Andrew
  - Knight of St. Alexander Nevsky
  - Knight of the White Eagle
  - Knight of St. Anna, 1st Class
  - Knight of St. Stanislaus, 1st Class
- Spain: Grand Cross of the Order of Charles III, with Collar, 8 February 1882
- Sweden-Norway: Knight of the Seraphim, 24 February 1864

== Ancestry ==
Ancestors of Karl Anton, Prince of Hohenzollern (born 1811)

8. Karl Friedrich, Prince of Hohenzollern-Sigmaringen
4. Anton Aloys, Prince of Hohenzollern-Sigmaringen
9. Countess Johanna of Hohenzollern-Berg
2. Karl, Prince of Hohenzollern-Sigmaringen
10. Philip Joseph, Prince of Salm-Kyrburg
5. Princess Amalie Zephyrine of Salm-Kyrburg
11. Princess Maria Theresa of Hornes
1. Karl Anton, Prince of Hohenzollern
12. Pierre Murat
6. Pierre Murat
13. Jeanne Loubières
3. Marie Antoinette Murat
14. Aymeric d'Astorg
7. Louise d'Astorg
15. Marie Alanyou

== See also ==
- Hohenzollern cabinet

Karl Anton, Prince of Hohenzollern (born 1811) House of Hohenzollern-Sigmaringen Cadet branch of the House of Hohenzollern Born: 7 September 1811 Died: 2 June 1885
Regnal titles
Preceded by Charles	Prince of Hohenzollern-Sigmaringen; 27 August 1848 – 7 December 1849	Principality annexed by the Kingdom of Prussia
German nobility
Preceded by Himself (Principality annexed by the Kingdom of Prussia)	Prince of Hohenzollern-Sigmaringen; 7 December 1849 – 2 June 1885	Succeeded by Leopold
Preceded by Himself, after the extinction of the Hechingen Branch of the House of Hohenzollern	Prince of Hohenzollern; 3 September 1869 – 2 June 1885	Succeeded by Leopold
Political offices
Preceded by Baron Otto Theodor von Manteuffel	Prime Minister of Prussia; 6 November 1858 – 12 March 1862	Succeeded by Prince Adolf of Hohenlohe-Ingelfingen
