= Princess Josephine of Baden =

Josephine of Baden
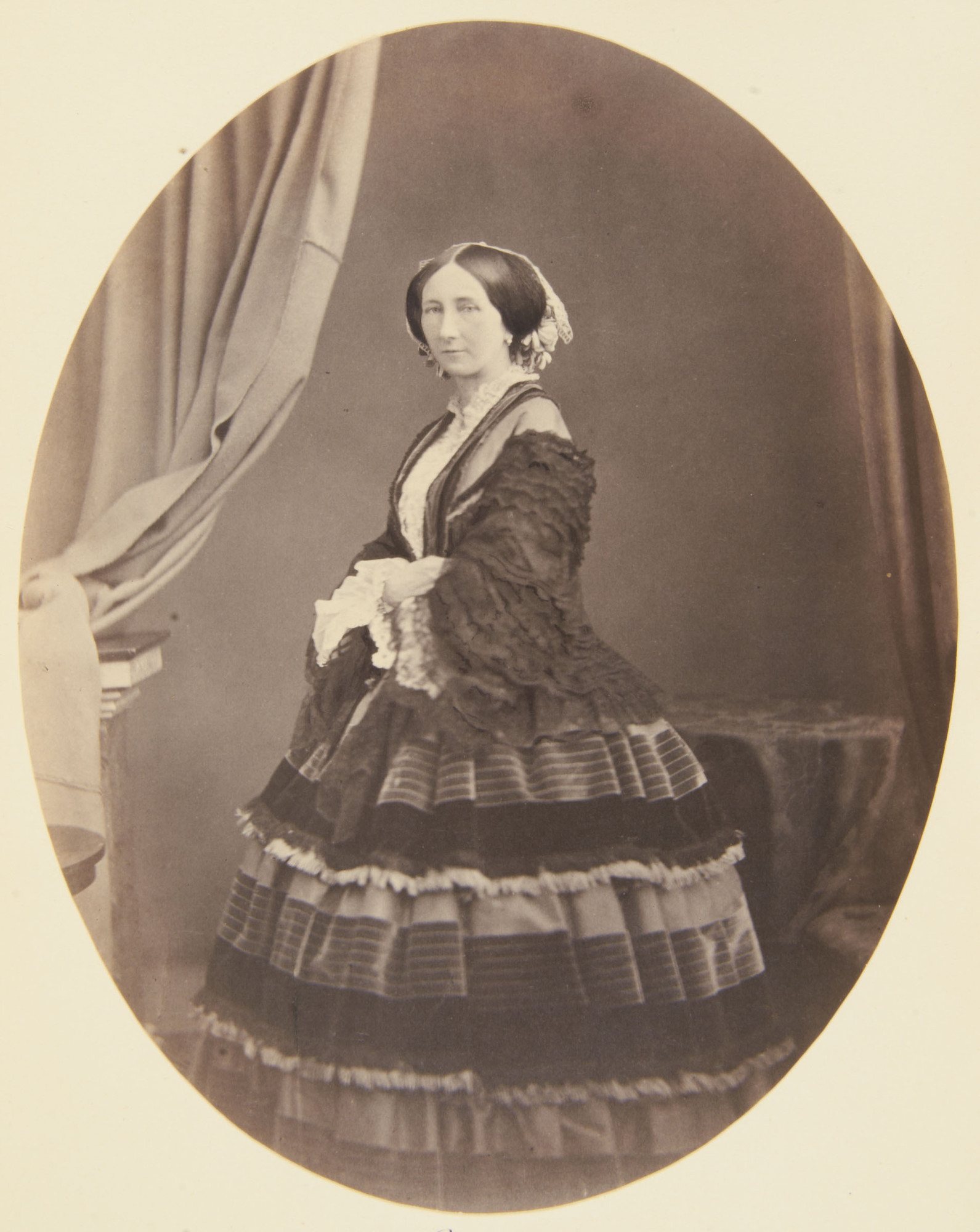
- Princess Josephine in 1858

Princess consort of Hohenzollern
- Tenure: 3 September 1869 – 2 June 1885

Princess consort of Hohenzollern-Sigmaringen
- Tenure: 27 August 1848 – 7 December 1849
- Born: 21 October 1813; Mannheim, Grand Duchy of Baden
- Died: 19 June 1900 (aged 86); Sigmaringen, German Empire
- Spouse: Karl Anton, Prince of Hohenzollern (m. 1834; died 1885)
- Issue: Leopold, Prince of Hohenzollern; Stephanie, Queen of Portugal; Carol I, King of Romania; Prince Anton; Prince Frederick; Princess Marie, Countess of Flanders
Names
- Josephine Friederike Luise
- House: Zähringen
- Father: Charles, Grand Duke of Baden
- Mother: Stéphanie de Beauharnais

Princess Josephine Friederike Luise of Baden (21 October 1813 – 19 June 1900) was Princess of Hohenzollern-Sigmaringen from 27 August 1848 to 7 December 1849 during the brief reign of her husband, Prince Karl Anton. Josephine was the second daughter of Charles, Grand Duke of Baden, and Stéphanie de Beauharnais. She was the mother of the first king of Romania, Carol I. Through her younger daughter Marie, she is the ancestress of the Belgian royal family, the grand ducal family of Luxembourg as well as the last Queen of Italy and her descendants. Through her son, Leopold, she is also ancestress of the Romanian royal family and the Serbian and Yugoslav Royal House.

== Life ==
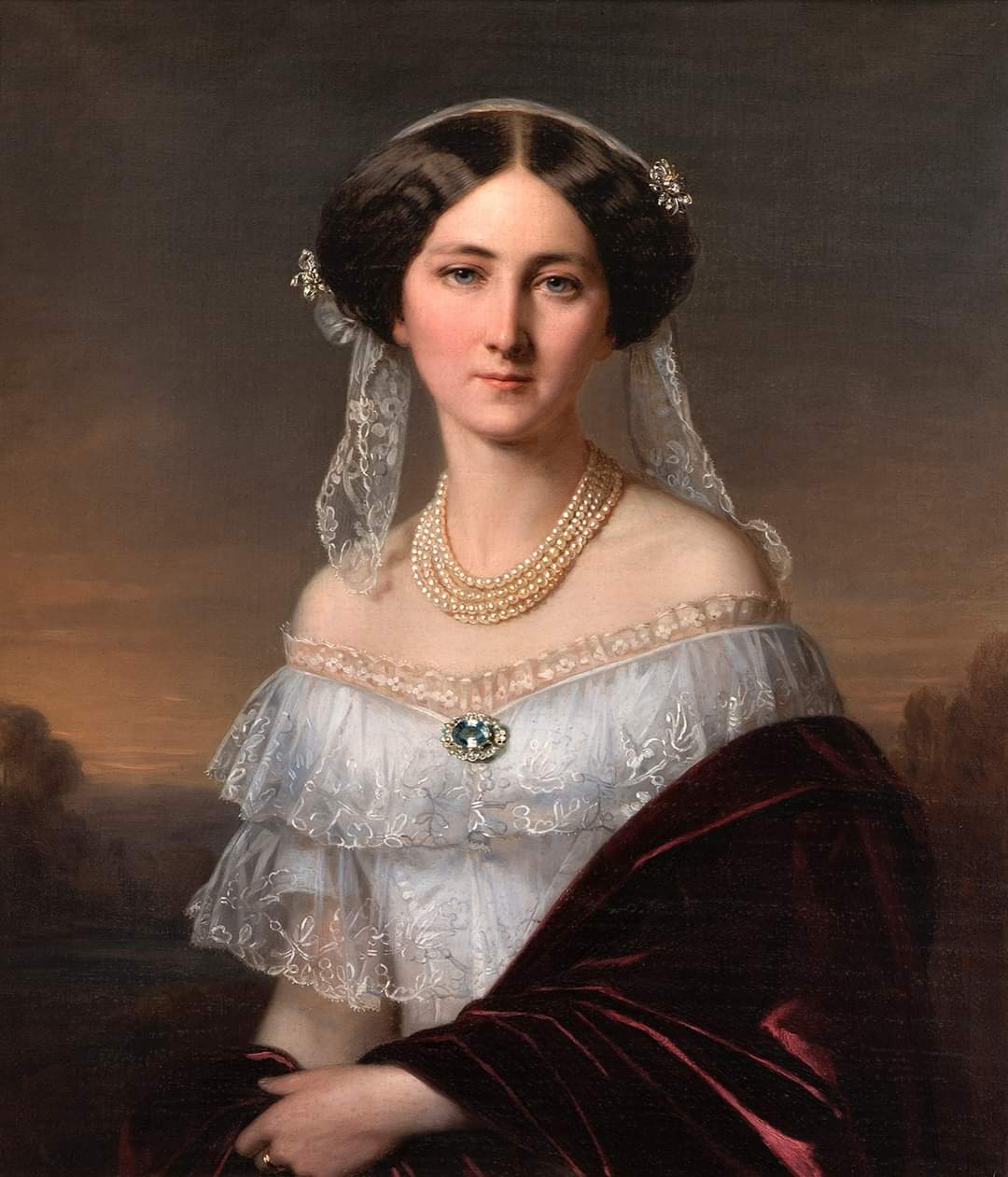
Undated portrait

On 21 October 1834 at Karlsruhe, she married Karl Anton Joachim Zephyrinus Friedrich Meinrad, Prince of Hohenzollern-Sigmaringen, son of Charles, Prince of Hohenzollern-Sigmaringen and Princess Marie Antoinette Murat.

They had six children:

- Leopold, Prince of Hohenzollern (22 September 1835 – 8 June 1905) he married Infanta Antónia of Portugal on 12 September 1861. They had three sons, including Ferdinand I of Romania.
- Princess Stephanie of Hohenzollern-Sigmaringen (15 July 1837 – 17 July 1859) she married King Pedro V of Portugal on 18 May 1858, without issue.
- Carol I of Romania (27 April 1839 – 10 October 1914) he married Princess Elisabeth of Wied on 15 November 1869. They had one daughter.
- Prince Anton of Hohenzollern-Sigmaringen (7 October 1841 – 6 August 1866) killed in the Austro-Prussian War at the age of 24.
- Prince Frederick of Hohenzollern-Sigmaringen (25 June 1843 – 2 December 1904) he married Princess Louise of Thurn and Taxis on 21 June 1879, without issue.
- Princess Marie of Hohenzollern-Sigmaringen (17 November 1845 – 26 November 1912) she married Prince Philippe, Count of Flanders on 25 April 1867. They had five children, including Albert I of Belgium.

She died at Sigmaringen on 19 June 1900. The Austrian court ordered a 12-day mourning for her death, during which members of the Habsburg dynasty were barred from participating in any festivities. This ensured that most members of the Habsburg imperial family were prevented from attending the wedding of Archduke Franz Ferdinand of Austria to Countess Sophie Chotek on 1 July.

== Legacy ==
Marie of Romania, wife of her grandson Ferdinand I, described Princess Josephine in her memoirs:

Quite the most fascinating member of the family, besides Fürst Leopold, was his charming old mother, born a Princess of Baden. Small and frail, she had exquisite features framed in veils and laces which heightened their delicacy. Her gowns and cloaks were just as they should be... she always wore gloves much too long on the fingers, which she had not the strength to pull on properly. Being stone-deaf she had expressive little gestures indicating when she had understood your pantomimic conversation; she liked a good joke and had a sweet way of lifting her hand and covering her mouth when amused or pleasantly shocked. Dear old Grandmamma Josephine had the most lovely nose I have ever seen; it was one of God's perfections.

== Honours ==
- Dame of the Order of Louise.

== Ancestry ==
Ancestors of Princess Josephine of Baden

8. Charles Frederick, Grand Duke of Baden
4. Charles Louis, Hereditary Prince of Baden
9. Princess Caroline Louise of Hesse-Darmstadt
2. Charles, Grand Duke of Baden
10. Louis IX, Landgrave of Hesse-Darmstadt
5. Princess Amalie of Hesse-Darmstadt
11. Countess Palatine Caroline of Zweibrücken
1. Princess Josephine of Baden
12. Claude de Beauharnais, comte des Roches-Baritaud
6. Claude de Beauharnais, comte des Roches-Baritaud
13. Marie-Anne-Françoise Mouchard de Chaban
3. Stéphanie de Beauharnais
14. Claude, marquis de Lézay-Marnézia
7. Adrienne de Lézay-Marnézia
15. Marie-Claudine de Nettancourt-Vaubécourt, dame de Vaubécourt

Princess Josephine of Baden House of Zähringen Born: 21 October 1813 Died: 19 June 1900
Regnal titles
Preceded by Princess Katharina of Hohenlohe-Waldenburg-Schillingsfürst	Princess of Hohenzollern-Sigmaringen; Countess of Hohenzollern-Haigerloch; 27 August 1848 – 7 December 1849	Principality annexed by the Kingdom of Prussia
Titles in pretence
Preceded by Herself	— TITULAR — Princess of Hohenzollern-Sigmaringen; Countess of Hohenzollern-Haigerloch; 7 December 1849 – 2 June 1885; Reason for succession failure: Principality annexed by the Kingdom of Prussia in 1850	Succeeded by Infanta Antónia of Portugal
Preceded by Baroness Amalie Schenk von Geyern	— TITULAR — Princess of Hohenzollern-Hechingen; 3 September 1869 – 2 June 1885; Reason for succession failure: Principality annexed by the Kingdom of Prussia in 1850	Succeeded by Infanta Antónia of Portugal
