= Stephanie of Hohenzollern-Sigmaringen =

Queen of Portugal from 1858 to 1859

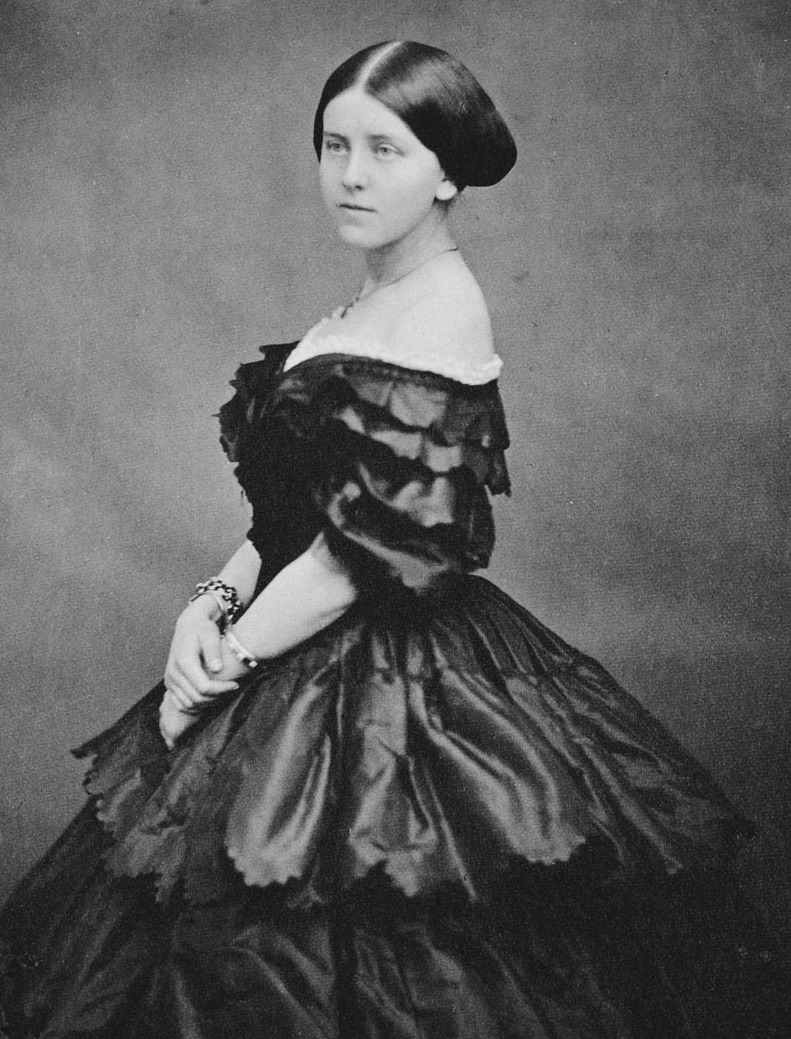
- Portrait, c. 1858

Queen consort of Portugal
- Tenure: 18 May 1858 – 17 July 1859
- Born: 15 July 1837; Krauchenwies, Sigmaringen, Hohenzollern-Sigmaringen
- Died: 17 July 1859 (aged 22); Necessidades Palace, Lisbon, Portugal
- Burial: Pantheon of the Braganzas
- Spouse: Pedro V of Portugal (m. 1858)
Names
- German: Stephanie Josepha Friederike Wilhelmine Antonia; Portuguese: Estefânia Josefa Frederica Guilhermina Antónia
- House: Hohenzollern-Sigmaringen
- Father: Karl Anton, Prince of Hohenzollern
- Mother: Princess Josephine of Baden

Stephanie of Hohenzollern-Sigmaringen (Portuguese: Estefânia; 15 July 1837 – 17 July 1859) was Queen of Portugal from her marriage to King Peter V on 18 May 1858 until her death the following year.

== Family ==
Born in Krauchenwies Castle in Krauchenwies, Sigmaringen, in 1837, Stephanie was the eldest daughter of Prince Karl Anton of Hohenzollern, head of the House of Hohenzollern-Sigmaringen, and his wife Princess Josephine of Baden. Her maternal grandparents were Karl, Grand Duke of Baden, and Stéphanie de Beauharnais, adopted daughter of Napoleon.

She was also a younger sister of Prince Leopold of Hohenzollern, older sister of King Carol I of Romania, and aunt of King Albert I of Belgium.

== Marriage ==
Stephanie married King Peter V of Portugal by proxy on 29 April 1858 at St. Hedwig's Cathedral in Berlin, where her eldest brother Leopold stood in for the groom. She was then married in person on 18 May 1858 at the Church of St. Dominic in Lisbon. Both bride and groom were a few months short of their twenty-first birthdays. Stephanie was received with much luxury and wrote home that the Portuguese understood luxury better than dignity. During her short period as queen, she became known for her role in founding new hospitals.

There were no children from this marriage. Stephanie fell ill with diphtheria and died only a year later in Lisbon at the age of 22. Her last words were "Comfort my Pedro". Her body was interred at the Braganza Pantheon inside the Monastery of São Vicente de Fora in Lisbon.

Pedro never married again and died of cholera on 11 November 1861. He was succeeded by his younger brother Luís.

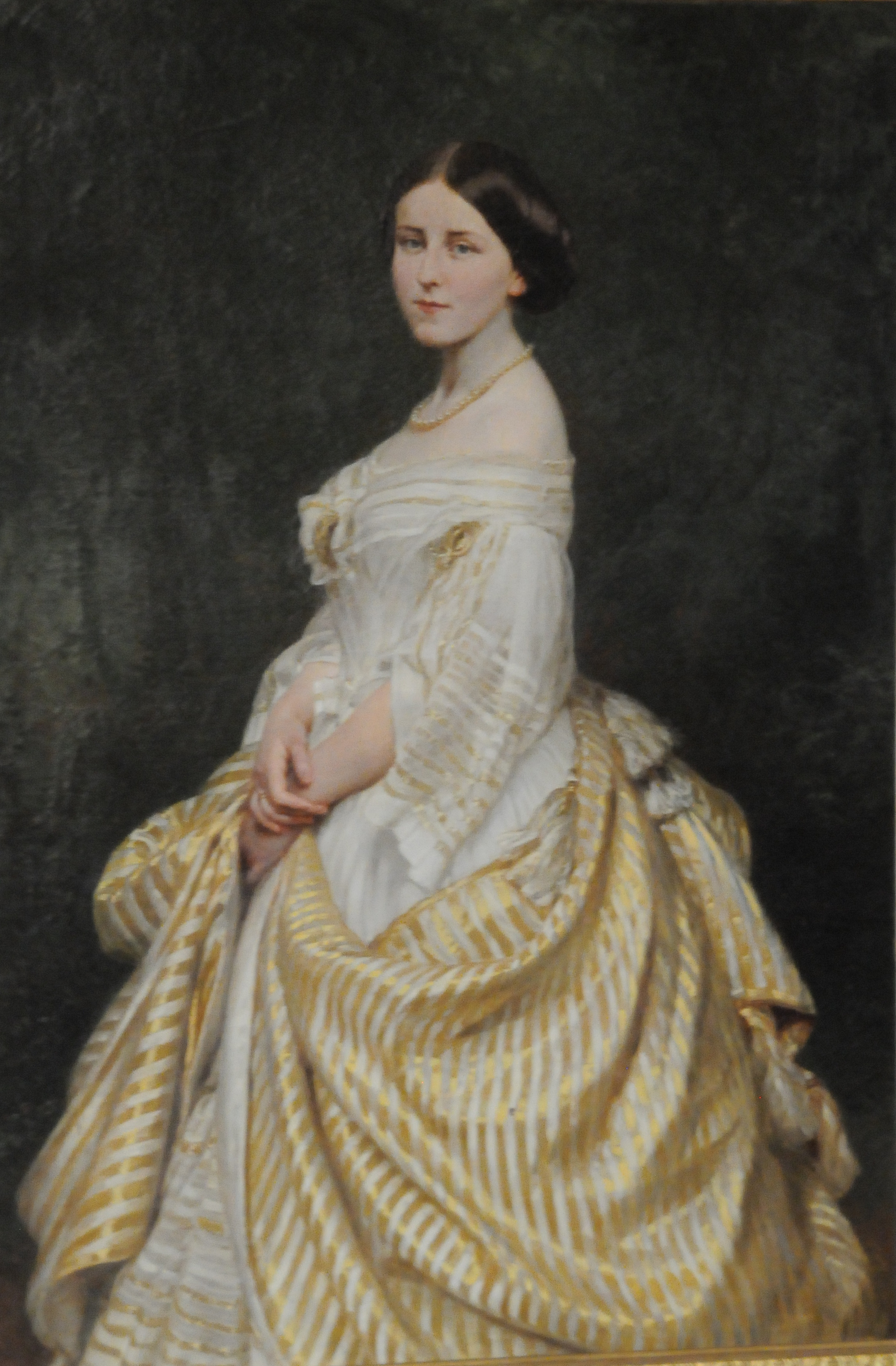
Portrait of Stephanie of Hohenzollern-Sigmaringen in 1860

== Archives ==
Stephanie's letters from Portugal to her mother, Josephine of Baden, between 1858 and 1859 are preserved in the Hohenzollern-Sigmaringen family archive, which is in the State Archive of Sigmaringen (Staatsarchiv Sigmaringen) in the town of Sigmaringen, Baden-Württemberg, Germany.

Stephanie's letters from Portugal to her brother, Leopold of Hohenzollern-Sigmaringen, between 1858 and 1859 are also preserved in the State Archive of Sigmaringen (Staatsarchiv Sigmaringen).

Stephanie of Hohenzollern-Sigmaringen House of Hohenzollern-Sigmaringen Cadet branch of the House of Hohenzollern Born: 15 July 1837 Died: 17 July 1859
Portuguese royalty
Preceded by Ferdinand of Saxe-Coburg-Gotha as prince consort	Queen consort of Portugal; 18 May 1858 – 17 July 1859	Succeeded by Maria Pia of Savoy
