= Leopold, Prince of Hohenzollern =

German prince (1835–1905)

Leopold
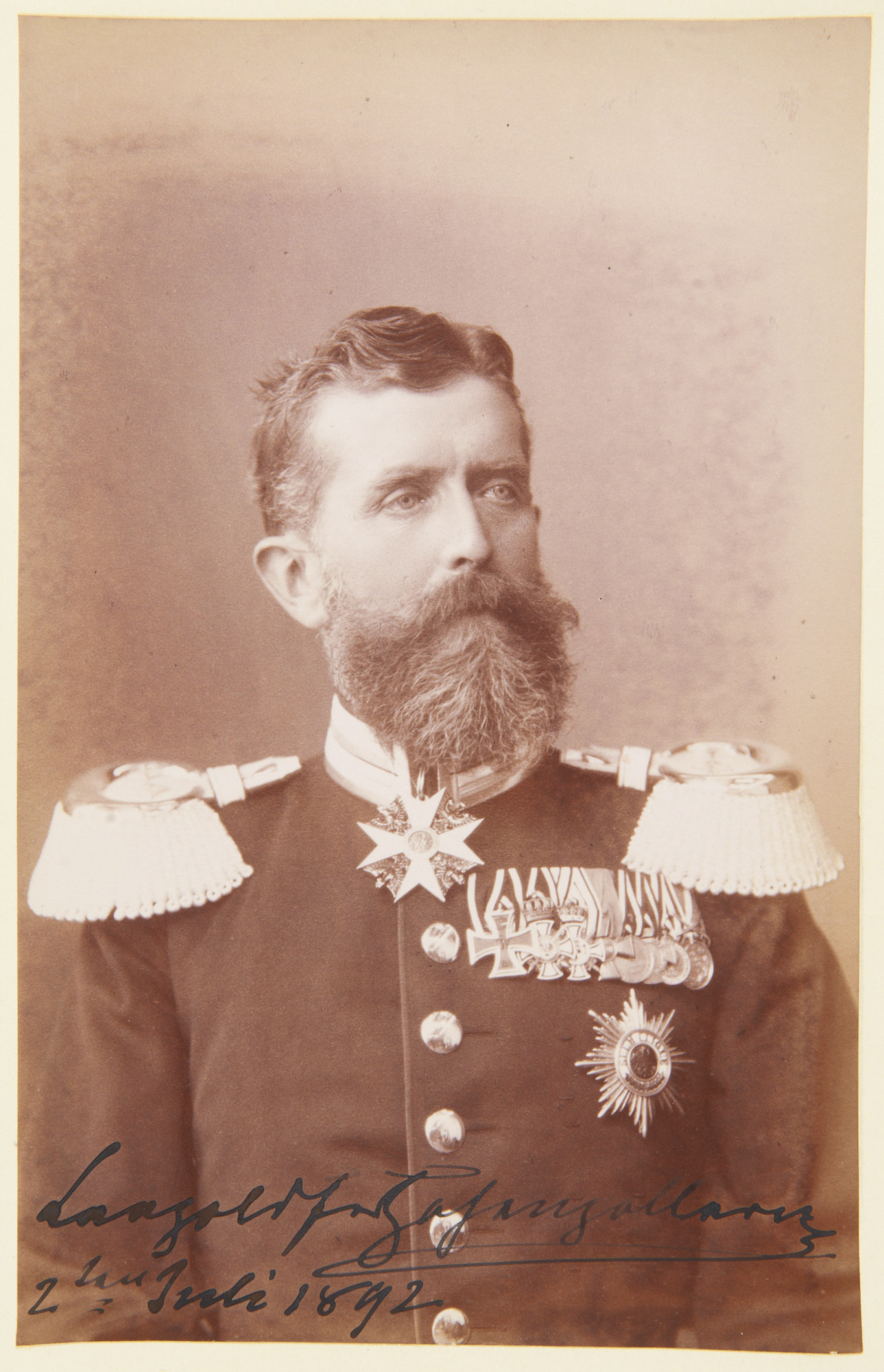
- Leopold in 1892

Prince of Hohenzollern
- Tenure: 2 June 1885 – 8 June 1905
- Predecessor: Karl Anton
- Successor: William
- Born: 22 September 1835; Krauchenwies, Hohenzollern-Sigmaringen
- Died: 8 June 1905 (aged 69); Berlin, German Empire
- Spouse: Infanta Antónia of Portugal (m. 1861)
- Issue: William, Prince of Hohenzollern; Ferdinand I of Romania; Prince Karl Anton
Names
- German: Leopold Stephan Karl Anton Gustav Eduard Tassilo
- House: Hohenzollern
- Father: Karl Anton, Prince of Hohenzollern
- Mother: Princess Josephine of Baden

Leopold, Prince of Hohenzollern (German: Leopold Stephan Karl Anton Gustav Eduard Tassilo Fürst von Hohenzollern; 22 September 1835 – 8 June 1905) was the head of the Swabian branch of the House of Hohenzollern, and played a fleeting role in European power politics in connection with the Franco-Prussian War.

He was born into the dynasty's Sigmaringen branch, which inherited all the dynasty's Swabian lands when the Hohenzollern-Hechingen branch became extinct.

Leopold's parents were Josephine of Baden and Karl Anton, Prince of Hohenzollern. Leopold was the older brother of King Carol I of Romania and father of the future King Ferdinand of Romania. Carol ascended to the Romanian throne in 1866, and Leopold renounced his rights to the Romanian succession in favor of his sons in 1880.

== Entry to European controversy ==
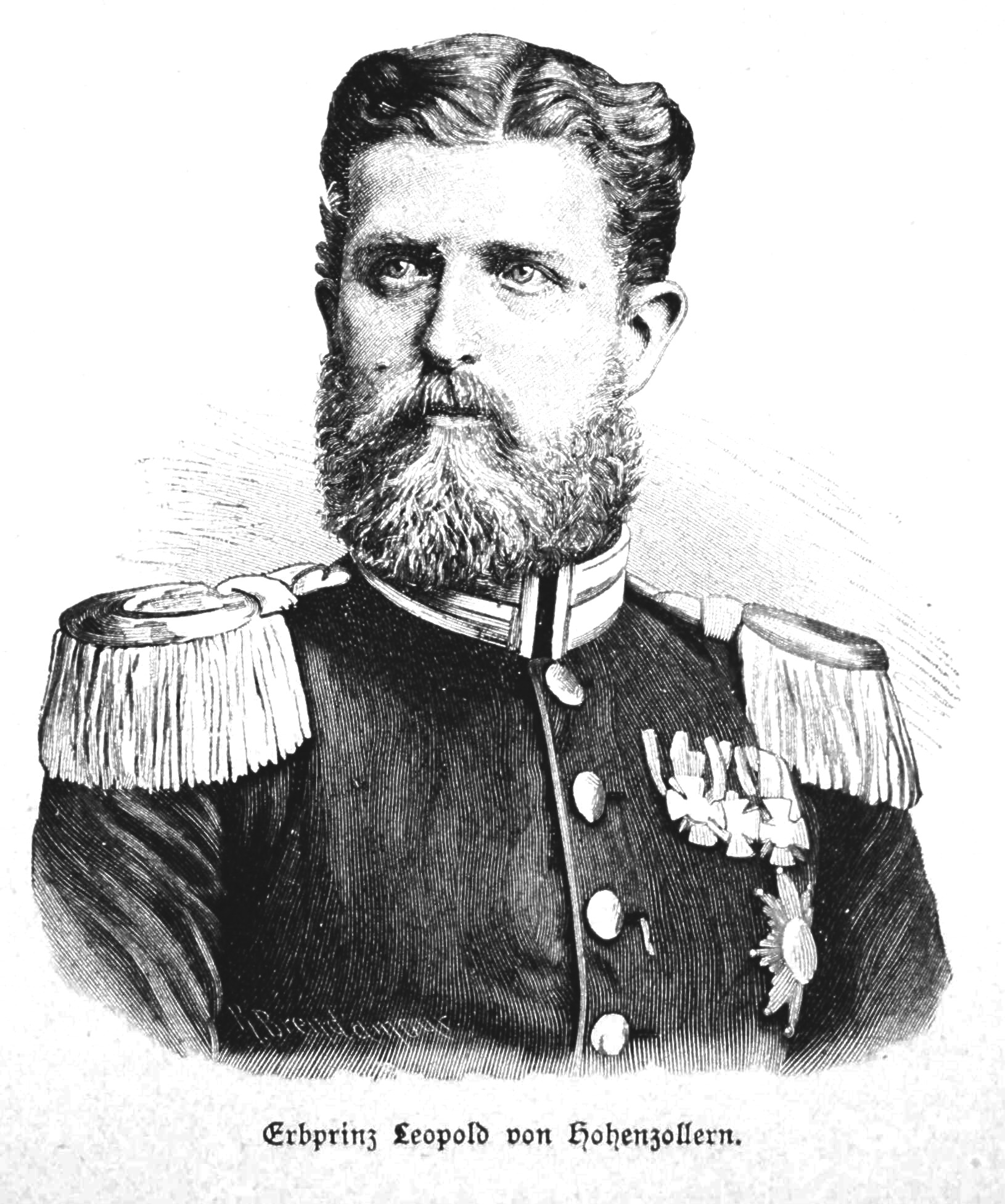
Engraving of Leopold by Richard Brend'amour, 1895–96

After the Spanish Revolution of 1868, which overthrew Queen Isabella II, Leopold was offered the Spanish crown by the new government. The offer was supported by Prussian Chancellor Otto von Bismarck but opposed by French Emperor Napoleon III on the grounds that the installation of a relative of the Prussian king would result in the expansion of Prussian influence and the encirclement of France.

In Spain, when the news spread that Leopold was a candidate for the crown, he began to be called "Leopoldo Olé-Olé si me eligen" (Leopoldo Olé-Olé if they choose me) as a play on words because of the difficult pronunciation of his surname for the Spanish.

Leopold initially refused the offer, but on 21 June 1870, he accepted the Spanish crown and the name "Leopoldo I". He was forced on 11 July to decline again due to French diplomatic pressure.

Additional demands that were made by the French government heightened diplomatic tensions between Paris and Berlin. The deliberate shortening of a diplomatic communiqué, the Ems Dispatch, led to declaration of war by France and the start of the Franco-Prussian War. Prussia's speedy mobilization, together with the support of the other members of the North German Confederation, resulted in French defeat, the consequences of which were the collapse of the Second French Empire, to be replaced by the Third Republic, and the creation of the German Empire. France lost most of Alsace and part of Lorraine and had to pay Prussia war reparations.

== Marriage and issue ==
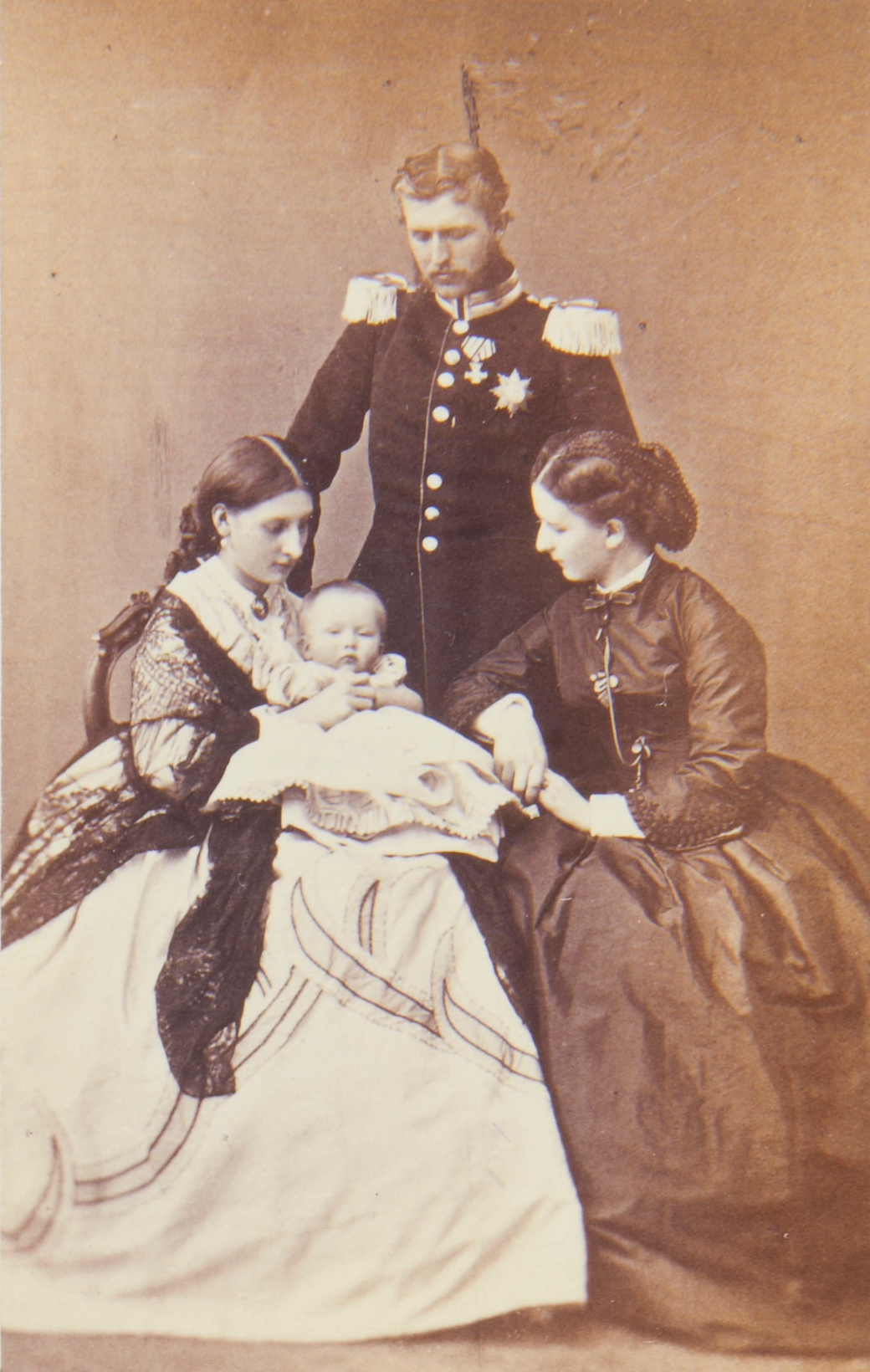
Leopold with his family, c. 1866

On 12 September 1861, Leopold married Infanta Antónia of Portugal, daughter of Queen Maria II of Portugal and King Ferdinand II of Portugal. They had the following children:

- William, Prince of Hohenzollern (7 March 1864 – 22 October 1927) he married Princess Maria Teresa of Bourbon-Two Sicilies on 27 June 1889. They had three children. He remarried Princess Adelgunde of Bavaria on 20 January 1915.
- Ferdinand I of Romania (25 August 1865 – 20 July 1927). King of Romania from 1914 to 1927. In 1893, he married Princess Marie of Edinburgh. They had six children.
- Prince Karl Anton of Hohenzollern (1 September 1868 – 21 February 1919) he married Princess Joséphine Caroline of Belgium on 28 May 1894. They had four children.

== Honours ==
Leopold received the following decorations and awards:

- Hohenzollern: Cross of Honour of the Princely House Order of Hohenzollern, 1st Class with Swords
- Prussia:
  - Grand Commander's Cross of the Royal House Order of Hohenzollern, 8 May 1858; Knight's Cross with Swords, 1866
  - Grand Cross of the Red Eagle, 8 May 1864
  - Iron Cross (1870), 2nd Class
  - Knight of the Black Eagle, 11 June 1879; with Collar, 1880
  - Service Award Cross
- Duchy of Anhalt: Grand Cross of Albert the Bear, 24 March 1865
- Baden:
  - Knight of the House Order of Fidelity, 1858
  - Grand Cross of the Zähringer Lion, 1858
- Kingdom of Bavaria: Knight of St. Hubert, 1890
- (Saxe-Coburg and Gotha) (Duchy of Saxe-Altenburg) (Saxe-Meiningen) Ernestine duchies: Grand Cross of the Saxe-Ernestine House Order, April 1864
- Grand Duchy of Hesse: Grand Cross of the Ludwig Order, 19 December 1888
- Mecklenburg: Grand Cross of the Wendish Crown, with Crown in Ore
- Saxe-Weimar-Eisenach: Grand Cross of the White Falcon, 6 March 1869
- Kingdom of Saxony: Knight of the Rue Crown, 1893
- Schaumburg-Lippe: Military Merit Medal with Swords
- Württemberg: Grand Cross of the Württemberg Crown, 1875
- Austria-Hungary:
  - Grand Cross of the Imperial Order of Leopold, 1878
  - Grand Cross of St. Stephen, 1904
- Belgium: Grand Cordon of the Order of Leopold
- Kingdom of Portugal:
  - Grand Cross of the Sash of the Two Orders
  - Grand Cross of the Tower and Sword
- Kingdom of Romania:
  - Grand Cross of the Star of Romania
  - Grand Cross of the Crown of Romania
- Russian Empire: Knight of St. Stanislaus, 1st Class

== Ancestry ==
Ancestors of Leopold, Prince of Hohenzollern

8. Anton Aloys, Prince of Hohenzollern-Sigmaringen
4. Karl, Prince of Hohenzollern-Sigmaringen
9. Princess Amalie Zephyrine of Salm-Kyrburg
2. Karl Anton, Prince of Hohenzollern
10. Pierre Murat
5. Marie Antoinette Murat
11. Louise d'Astorg
1. Leopold, Prince of Hohenzollern
12. Charles Louis, Hereditary Prince of Baden
6. Charles, Grand Duke of Baden
13. Princess Amalie of Hesse-Darmstadt
3. Princess Josephine of Baden
14. Claude de Beauharnais, comte des Roches-Baritaud
7. Stéphanie de Beauharnais
15. Adrienne de Lézay-Marnézia

Leopold, Prince of Hohenzollern House of Hohenzollern Born: 22 September 1835 Died: 8 June 1905
German nobility
Preceded by Charles Anthony	Prince of Hohenzollern; 2 June 1885 – 8 June 1905	Succeeded by William
