= New Era (Prussia) =

The New Era (German: Neue Ära) was the term for the government policy in the Kingdom of Prussia between autumn 1858 and spring 1862. It followed the Era of Reaction under Frederick William IV.

== Overview ==
The New Era began with the regency of Wilhelm I on October 7, 1858, who became King Wilhelm I in 1861. After the Era of Reaction of the 1850s, which had emphasized the preservation of the old conservative prerogatives, the new regent tried to enforce reforms by calling together a conservative-liberal coalition government. However, the reforms were blocked by the deputies from the Junker nobility, which led the Prussian House of Lords.
