= Marie Antoinette Murat =

- Princess of Hohenzollern-Sigmaringen
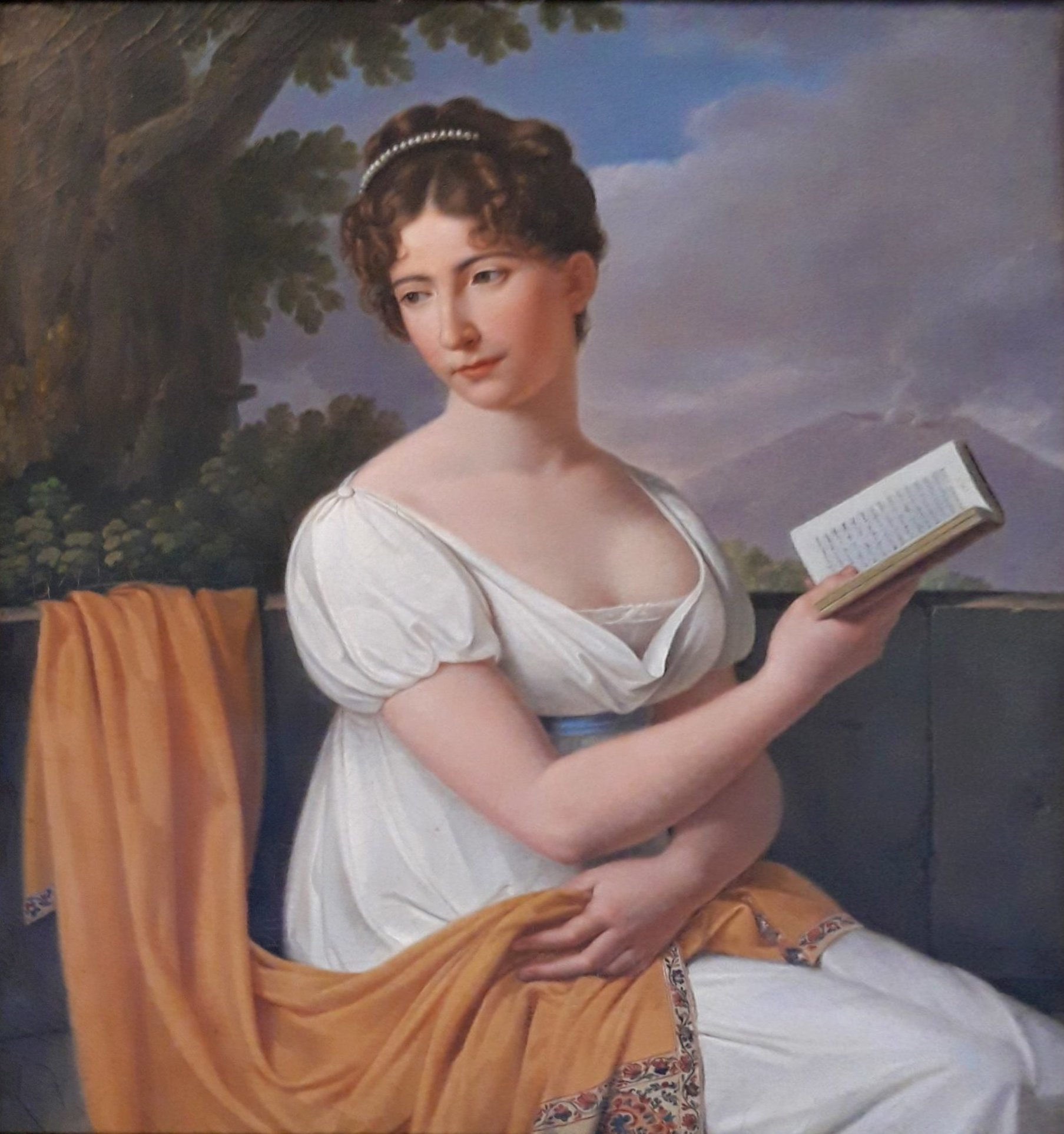
- Born: 3 January 1793; Cahors, French Republic
- Died: 19 January 1847 (aged 54); Sigmaringen, Hohenzollern-Sigmaringen
- Spouse: Charles, Prince of Hohenzollern-Sigmaringen (m. 1808)
- Issue: Princess Karoline; Charles Anthony, Prince of Hohenzollern; Princess Amalie; Princess Friederike
- House: Murat
- Father: Pierre Murat
- Mother: Louise d'Astorg

Marie Antoinette Murat (3 January 1793, Cahors – 19 January 1847, Sigmaringen) was Princess of Hohenzollern-Sigmaringen as the wife of Karl, Prince of Hohenzollern-Sigmaringen. She was by birth member of the House of Murat. Marie Antoinette was the niece of Joachim Murat, King of Naples from 1808 to 1815 and the brother-in-law of Napoleon Bonaparte, through marriage to Napoleon's youngest sister, Caroline Bonaparte.

== Family ==
Marie Antoinette was a posthumous daughter of Pierre Murat, elder brother of Joachim Murat, King of Naples, and his wife, Louise d'Astorg, daughter of Aimery d'Astorg and Marie d'Alanyou.

== Marriage and issue ==
Marie Antoinette married Karl, Hereditary Prince of Hohenzollern-Sigmaringen, the eldest son of Anton Aloys, Prince of Hohenzollern-Sigmaringen and his wife, Princess Amalie Zephyrine of Salm-Kyrburg, on 4 February 1808 in Paris. Marie Antoinette and Charles had four children:

- Princess Annunziata Karoline Joachime Antoinette Amalie of Hohenzollern-Sigmaringen (6 June 1810 – 21 June 1885) ⚭ Prince Friedrich von Hohenzollern-Hechingen (1790-1847) ⚭ Johann Stäger von Waldburg (1813-1882)
- Karl Anton Joachim Zephyrinus Friedrich Meinrad, Prince of Hohenzollern-Sigmaringen (7 September 1811 – 2 June 1885)
- Princess Amalie Antoinette Karoline Adrienne of Hohenzollern-Sigmaringen (30 April 1815 – 14 January 1841)
- Princess Friederike Wilhelmine of Hohenzollern-Sigmaringen (24 March 1820 – 7 September 1906) ⚭ Gioacchino-Napoleone, Marchese di Pepoli (1825-1881)

== Ancestry ==
Ancestors of Marie Antoinette Murat

8. Guillaume Murat
4. Pierre Murat
9. Marguerite Herbeil
2. Pierre Murat
10. Pierre Loubières
5. Jeanne Loubières
11. Jeanne Viellescazes
1. Marie Antoinette Murat
12. Antoine d'Astorg
6. Aymeric d'Astorg
13. Maria de Mary
3. Louise d'Astorg
14. Jean Alanyou
7. Marie Alanyou
15. Louise de Valon

Marie Antoinette Murat House of Murat Born: 3 January 1793 Died: 19 January 1847
German nobility
Preceded by Amalie Zephyrine of Salm-Kyrburg	Princess of Hohenzollern-Sigmaringen; 1831 – 19 January 1847	Succeeded by Katharina of Hohenlohe-Waldenburg-Schillingsfürst
