= Sash of the Three Orders =

Presidential sash of Portugal

Sash of the Three Orders Banda das Três Ordens
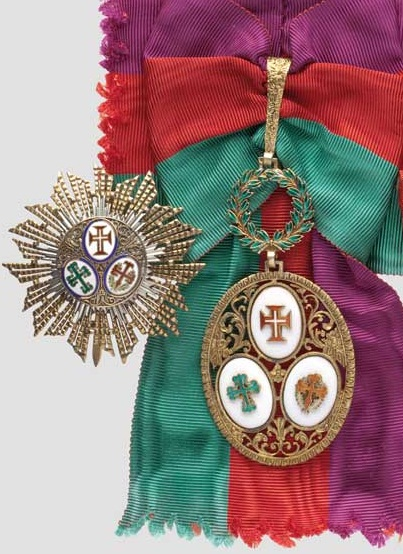
- Insignia of the order in 1918

Awarded by Portuguese Republic
- Type: Presidential Sash and Breast Star
- Established: 17 June 1789
- Eligibility: President of the Republic in office
- Awarded for: exclusive use of the President of Portugal in office
- Grand Master: President of Portugal
- Grades: Grand Cross (BTO)

Precedence
- Next (higher): None
- Next (lower): Order of the Tower and Sword
- Ribbon bar of the Sash of the Three Orders

The Sash of the Three Orders (Portuguese: Banda das Três Ordens, or Banda da Grã-Cruz das Três Ordens) is a decoration that combines the insignia of the Grand Crosses of the Military Orders of Christ, Aviz and St. James of the Sword. It is the symbol of Portuguese presidential magistracy: it is worn exclusively by the President as head of state and, in that capacity, as fount of the Portuguese honours system. Therefore, it cannot be conferred on non-nationals or foreigners, nor can it be used outside the exercise of office of the President.

Unlike other decorations, the Sash is not granted to Presidents upon their inauguration, but rather only worn by them during their terms in office. It can be worn with any of the Grand Collars of the orders possessing that grade, but without the sash and wearing the respective order's star that gives precedence to that of the Three Orders' Sash.

== History ==
The decoration, along with the similar Sash of the Two Orders, was officially founded in 1789 by Queen Maria I. However, its origins can be traced further back to 1551, when Pope Julius III, under great diplomatic pressure, issued the Praeclara Clarissimi Papal Bull of 30 November, surrendering his position as Grand Master of the three Catholic knightly orders (the Order of Our Lord Jesus Christ, the Order of St. Benedict of Aviz, and the Order of Santiago) in perpetuum to King João III of the House of Aviz, who proclaimed it hereditary in the Portuguese Crown. Despite this, the monarchs often wore only the insignia of the Order of Christ.

It was during the reign of Maria I that the orders were secularized from religious orders into military orders of merit; the queen further decreed that the insignia of all three orders were to be combined into one, to ensure that no one order was favored above the others. The Sash thus became a unique decoration worn by the monarch, distinguishing them as Grand Master of the Three Military Orders, along with all other Portuguese orders of chivalry. It was also entitled to be worn by the heir to the throne (titled Prince of Brazil and then, from 1815, the Prince Royal of Portugal) as "Grand Commander of the Three Orders", and on occasion gifted to the consort of the monarch upon their marriage. Other princes of the blood royal (Infantes) belonging to the House of Braganza, meanwhile, were entitled to wear the Sash of the Two Orders.

During the era of the constitutional monarchy, it was customary to confer the Sash on foreign monarchs and heads of state as a diplomatic gesture. In the wake of the revolution of 1910 and the proclamation of the Republic, the Sash was abolished in conjunction with all royal orders (save for the Order of the Tower and Sword). It was later restored in 1918 by decree of President Sidónio Pais, after which it continued to be awarded to foreign heads of state.

In 1962, a new decree restricted the Sash of the Three Orders to a decoration exclusive to the President, and thus could no longer be conferred. So, after the last surviving recipient Queen Elizabeth II died in 2022, only the President of Portugal can wear the Sash.

=== Brazilian line ===
The Brazilian branch of the Three Orders' Sash was founded by Emperor Pedro I on 13 May 1825, and was abolished in 1891 by the First Brazilian Republic.

== Insignia ==
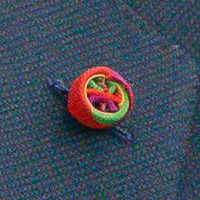
The rosette of the Sash of the Three Orders

- The badge of the decoration is an oval in gold filigree, enamelled white on both sides; before 1823, it was made of plain silver or gold with a blank reverse. The medallion depicts within three smaller ovals with the crosses of the three military orders: the order of Christ on top, the order of Aviz on the bottom left, and the order of St. James on the bottom right. During the era of the monarchy, the badge was surmounted by the royal crown, and each cross surmounted by a Heart of Jesus decoration; after 1910 the crown was replaced by a laurel wreath. The Brazilian version of the badge used the imperial crown.
- The sash of the decoration is constituted of three equal stripes, its colors in the following order: green (Aviz), red (Christ), and violet (St. James); before 1796 the colors were red, green, and red.
- The star of the decoration is a gilt circle depicting the crosses of the three orders, superimposed on an eight-pointed star in silver with a gold border. During the era of the monarchy, the star was surmounted by a Heart of Jesus decoration; prior to 1962 the decoration used a silver "splendor" of 22 or 24 rays. Upon his abdication, Pedro I wore a modified breast star modeled on that of the Order of the Southern Cross.
- The rosette of the decoration was first introduced in 2011, and designed to be worn with civilian clothing. It is 12 millimeters in diameter with gold trim, with the same colors as the ribbon.

== Notable foreign recipients ==
From 1789 to 1910:

- Alexander I, Emperor of Russia (10 February 1824)
- Alexander I, King of Serbia (1893)
- Carlos IV, King of Spain (1796)
- Chulalongkorn, King of Siam (1897)
- Francis II, Holy Roman Emperor and Emperor of Austria (1818)
- Frederik VI, King of Denmark (21 May 1824)
- Friedrich Wilhelm III, King of Prussia (17 October 1825)
- George IV, King of the United Kingdom and Hanover (7 April 1815)
- Guangxu I, Emperor of China (1904)
- Louis XVIII, King of France and Navarre (10 October 1823)
- Napoleon I, Emperor of the French (8 May 1805)
- Wilhelmina I, Queen of the Netherlands (7 February 1901)
- Willem I, King of the Netherlands and Grand Duke of Luxembourg (4 October 1825)

From 1918 to 1962:

- Albert I, King of the Belgians (19 July 1919) – he was previously awarded the royal version of the Sash by his cousin, King Manuel II of Portugal, on 14 June 1910
- Baudouin, King of the Belgians (14 March 1957)
- Bhumibol Adulyadej, King of Thailand (22 August 1960)
- Carol II, King of Romania (18 October 1939)
- Francisco Franco, Caudillo of Spain (26 January 1962)
- Elizabeth II of the United Kingdom (18 October 1955)
- George V of the United Kingdom (1919)
- George VI of the United Kingdom (2 May 1939)
- Juscelino Kubitschek, 21st President of Brazil (15 July 1957)
- Leopold III, King of the Belgians (23 February 1938)
- Haile Selassie, Emperor of Ethiopia (10 August 1959)
- Victor Emmanuel III, King of Italy (1919)

== Gallery ==
In the official portraits of many of the Portuguese Heads of State from the 19th and 20th centuries, the Sash of the Three Orders is one of the main piece represented:

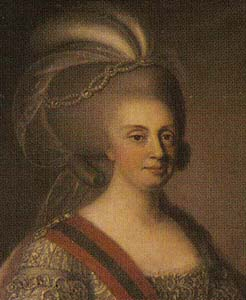
Maria I of Portugal, the Pious

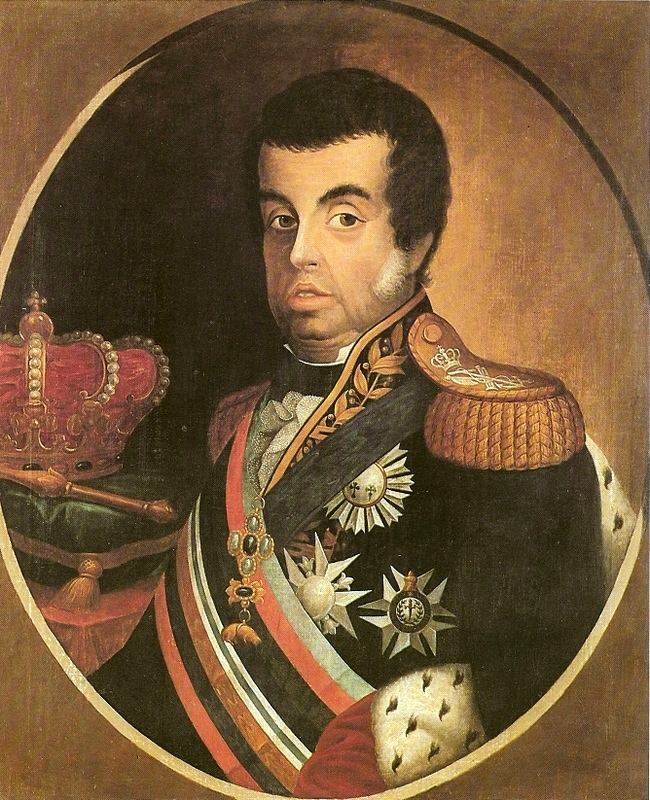
John VI of Portugal, the Clement

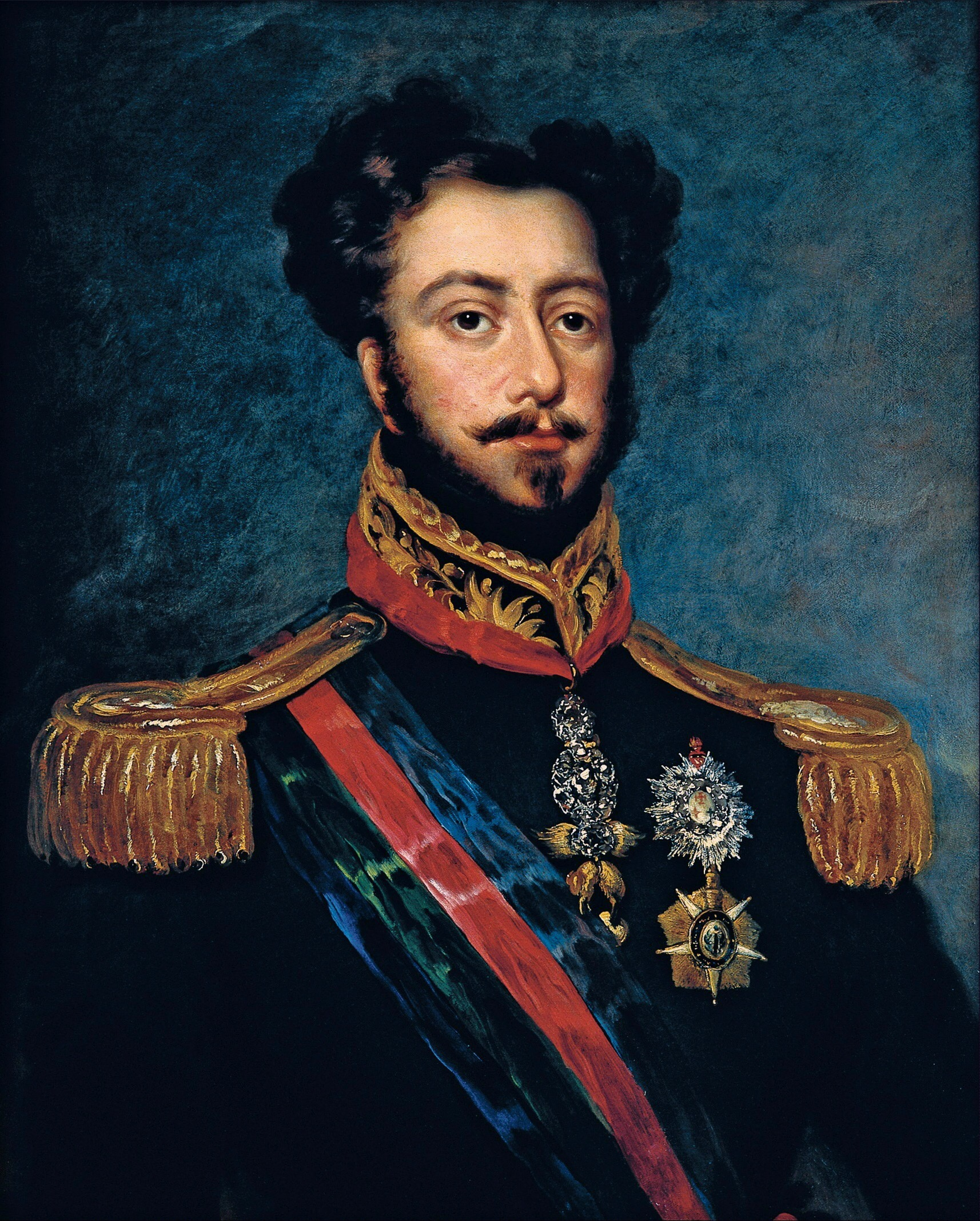
Peter IV of Portugal & I of Brazil, the Soldier King

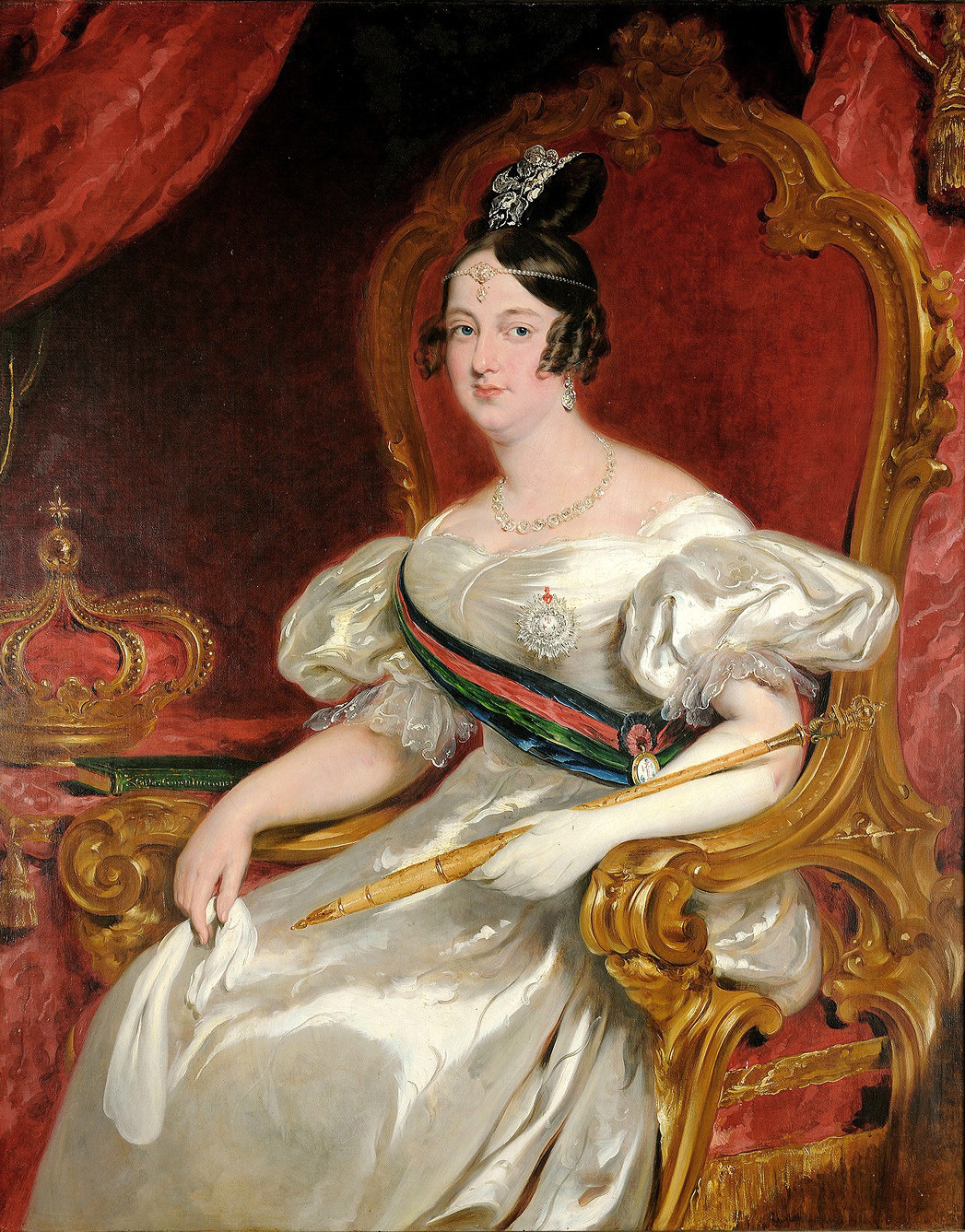
Maria II of Portugal, the Educator

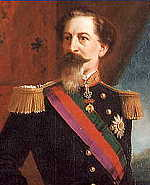
Fernando II of Portugal, the Artist King

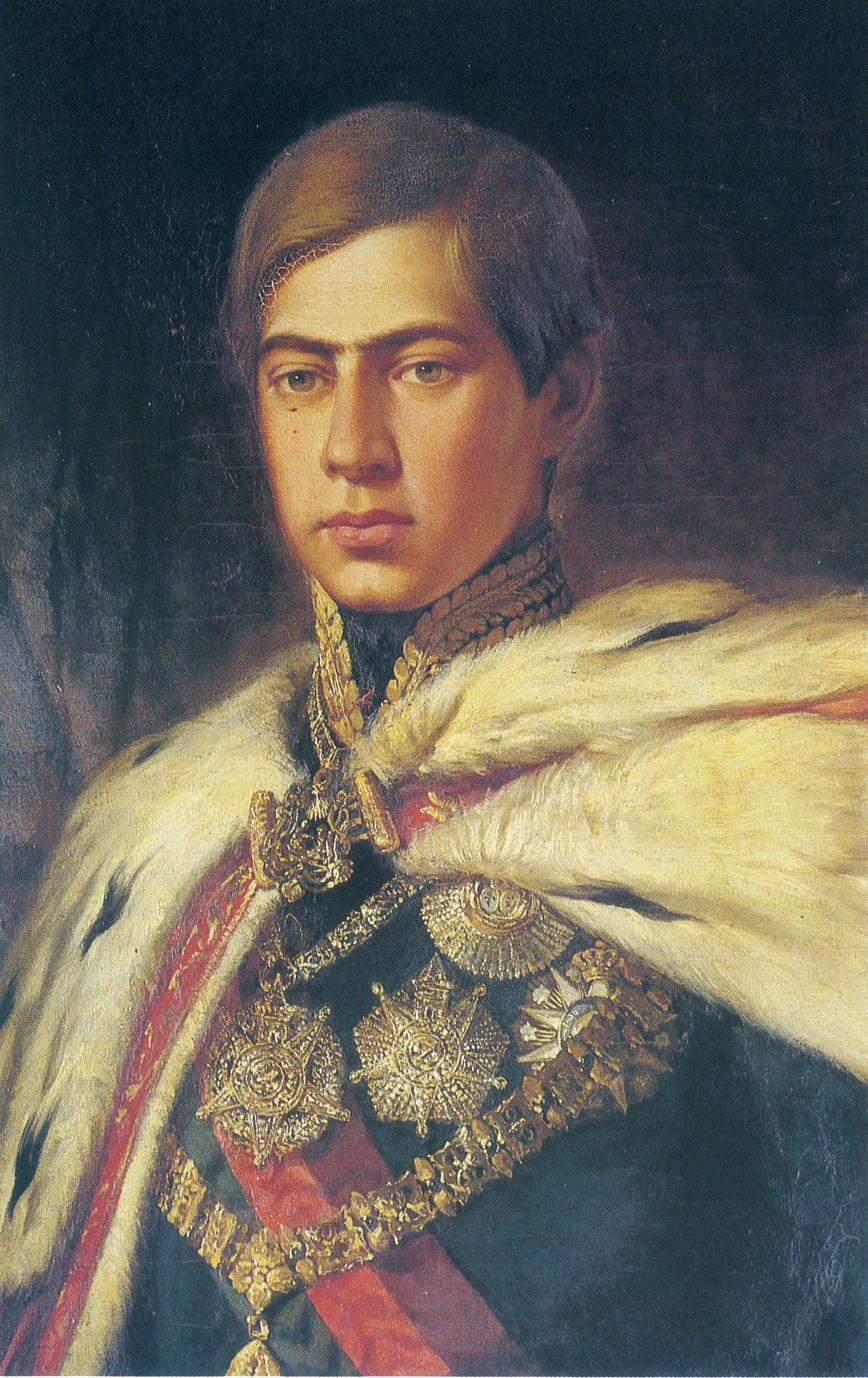
Peter V of Portugal, the Hopeful

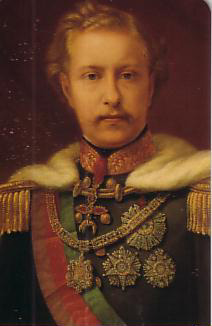
Luís I of Portugal, the Popular

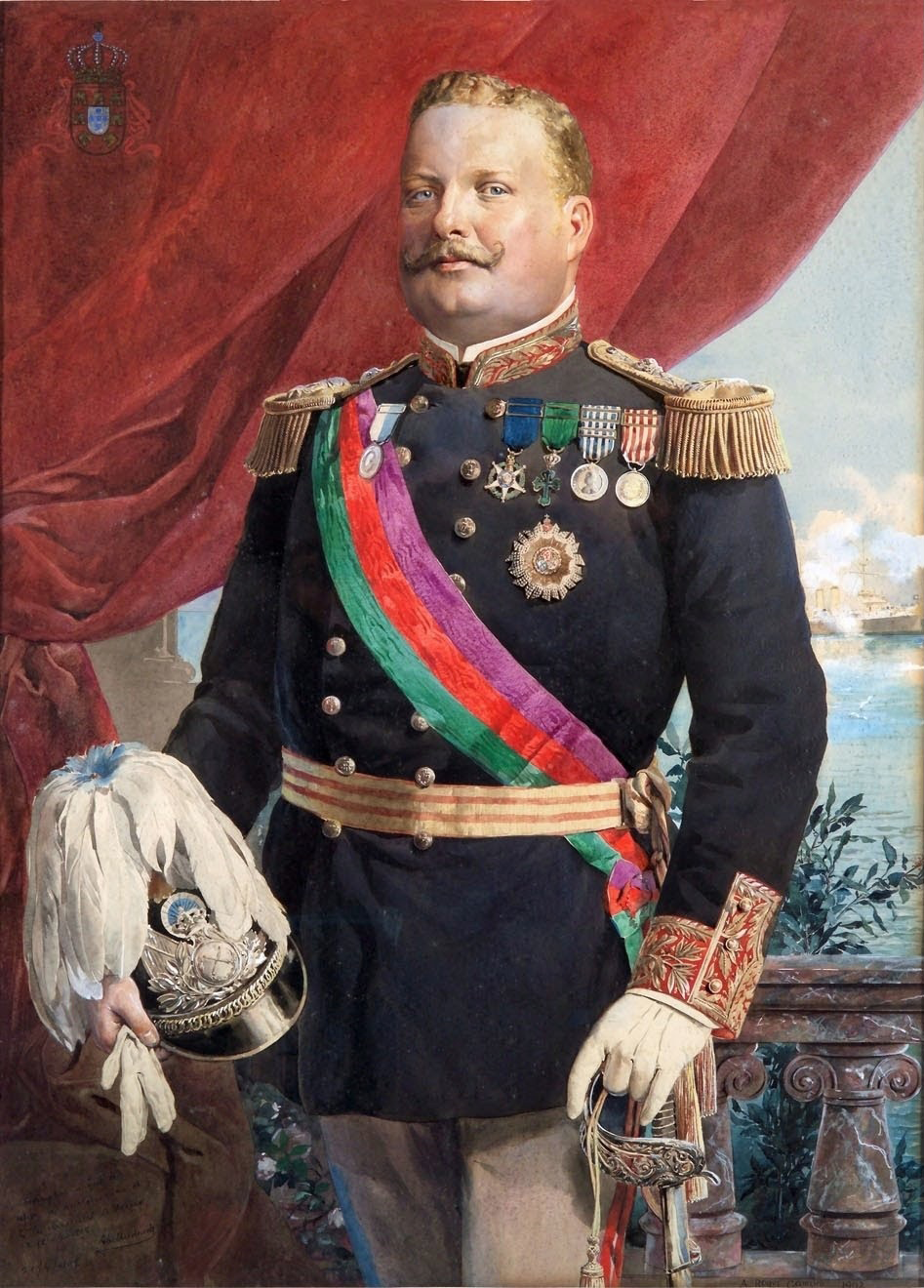
Carlos I of Portugal, the Diplomat

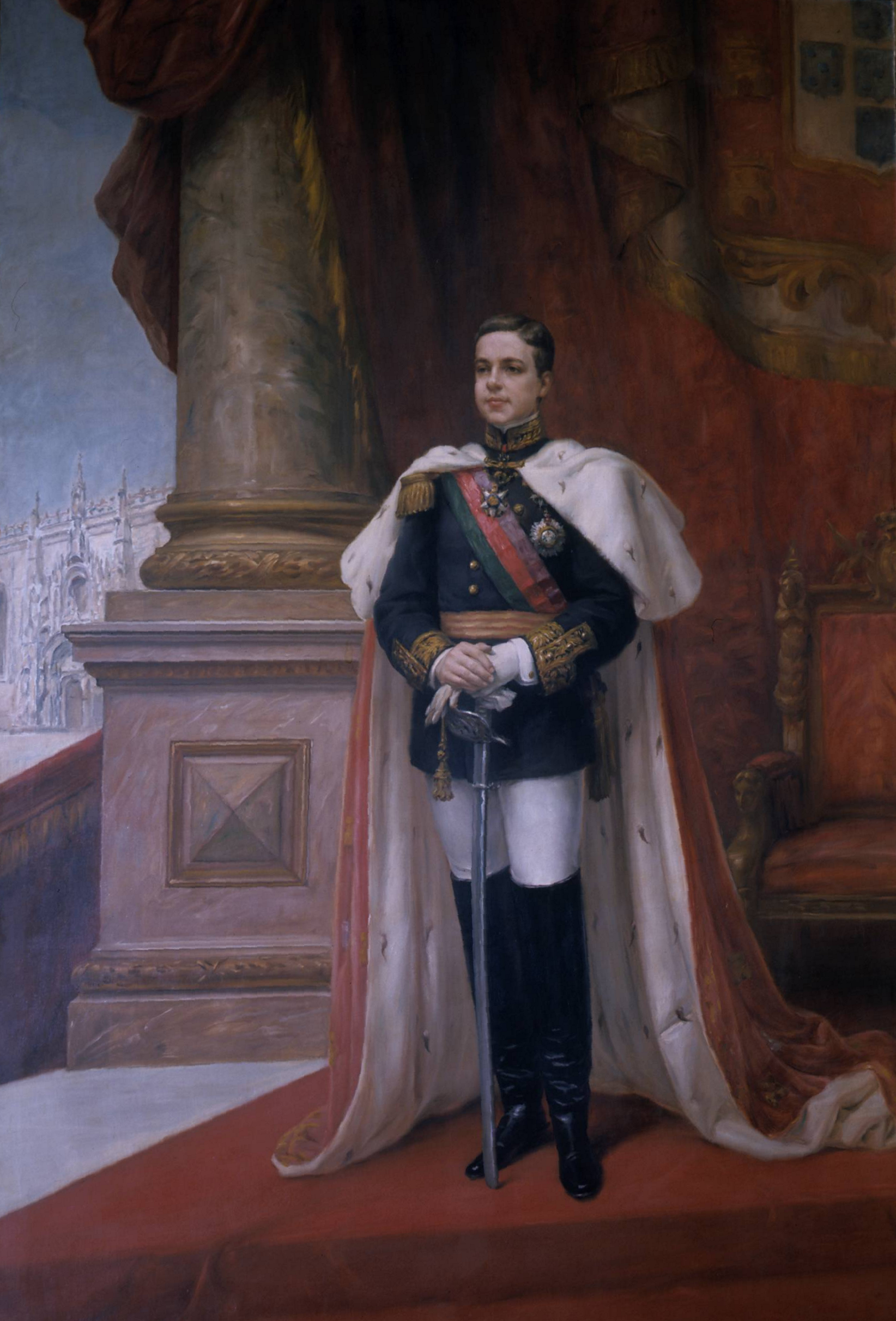
Manuel II of Portugal, the Patriot

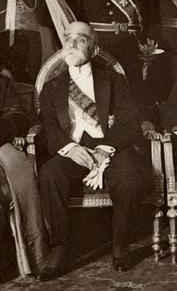
Doctor Bernardino Machado, 3rd and 8th President of Portugal

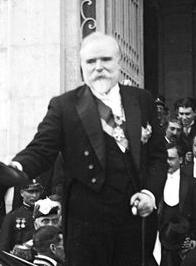
Dr. António José de Almeida, 6th President of Portugal

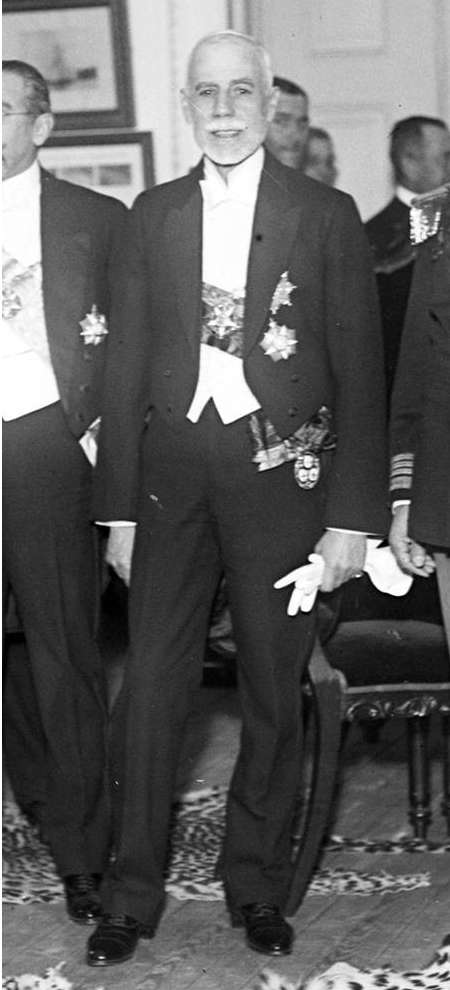
Manuel Teixeira Gomes, 7th President of Portugal

Several portraits of Portuguese and Brazilian royalty also display the use of the Sash:

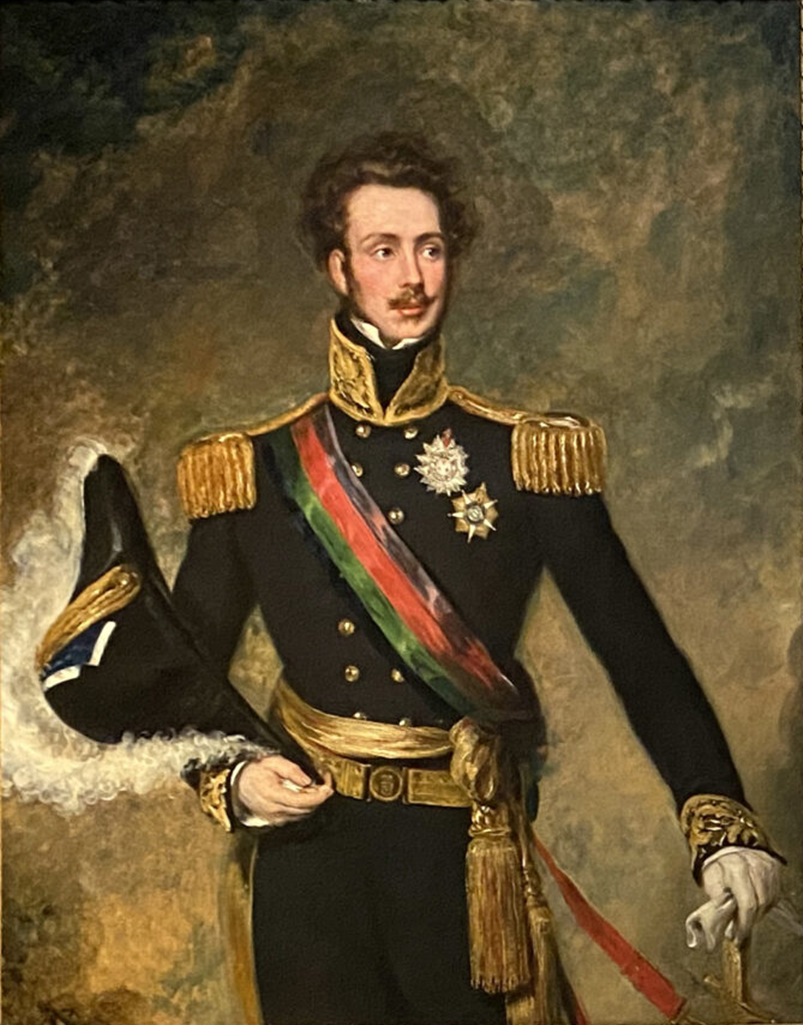
Augusto, Duke of Santa Cruz, Prince-consort of Portugal

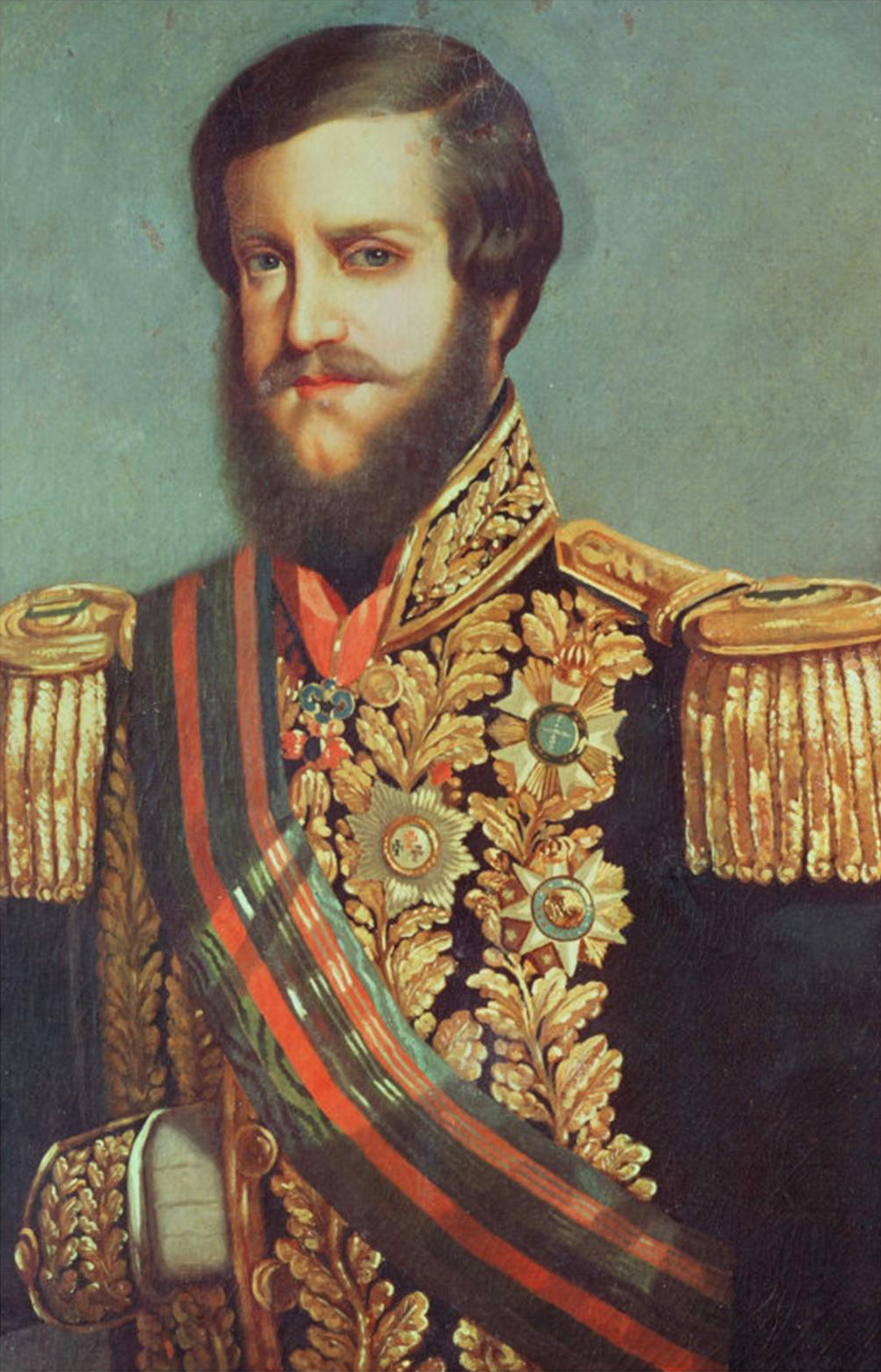
Pedro II of Brazil, the Magnanimous, wearing the Brazilian version of the Sash

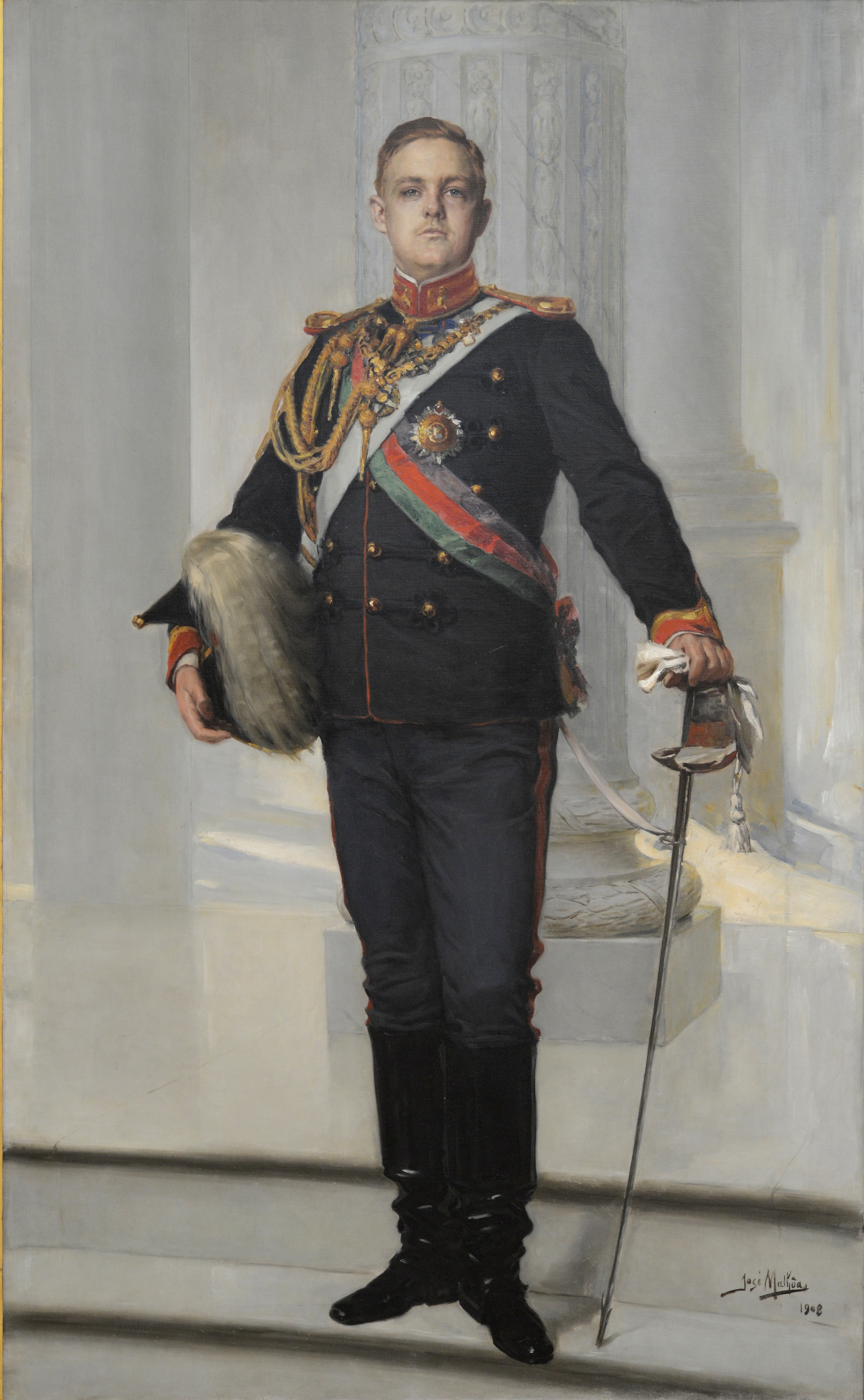
Luís Filipe, Prince Royal of Portugal
