= Prince Karl Anton of Hohenzollern (born 1868) =

German prince

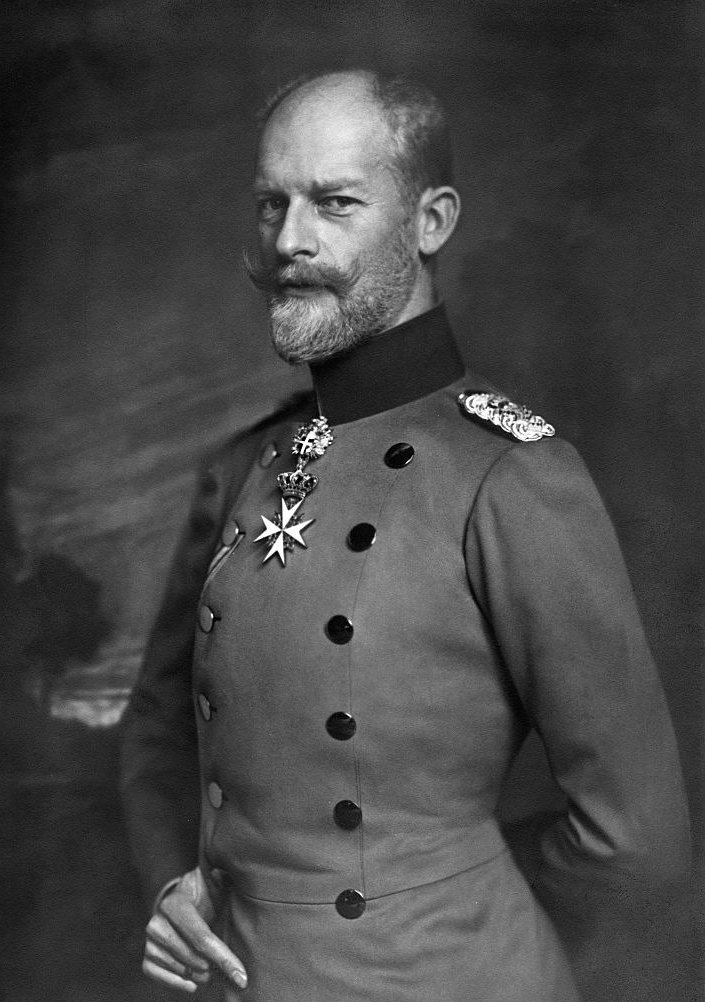
- Born: 1 September 1868; Sigmaringen, Province of Hohenzollern, Prussia
- Died: 21 February 1919 (aged 50); Namedy, Weimar Republic
- Spouse: Princess Joséphine Caroline of Belgium (m. 1894)
- Issue: Princess Stephanie; Princess Marie Antoinette; Prince Albrecht; Princess Henriette
Names
- German: Karl Anton Friedrich Wilhelm Ludwig
- House: Hohenzollern-Sigmaringen
- Father: Leopold, Prince of Hohenzollern
- Mother: Infanta Antónia of Portugal

Prince Karl Anton of Hohenzollern-Sigmaringen (German: Karl Anton Friedrich Wilhelm Ludwig Prinz von Hohenzollern-Sigmaringen; 1 September 1868 – 21 February 1919) was a member of the Princely House of Hohenzollern-Sigmaringen. He was the third and youngest son of Leopold, Prince of Hohenzollern, and Infanta Antónia of Portugal. Karl Anton's elder brothers were William, Prince of Hohenzollern, and Ferdinand I of Romania.

== Marriage and issue ==
On 28 May 1894 in Brussels, Karl Anton married his cousin Princess Joséphine Caroline of Belgium (18 October 1872, Brussels - 6 January 1958, Namur), daughter of Prince Philippe, Count of Flanders and Princess Marie of Hohenzollern-Sigmaringen. In 1909, the couple purchased Namedy castle near Andernach. Karl Anton served as a Prussian Lieutenant general during World War I and died after his return to Namedy on 21 February 1919 at the age of 50.

They had four children:

- Princess Stephanie Josephine Karola Philippine Leopoldine Marie of Hohenzollern (8 April 1895 – 7 August 1975) she married Prince Joseph Ernst Fugger of Glött, on 18 May 1920 and they were divorced in 1943.
- Princess Marie Antoinette Wilhelmine Auguste Viktoria of Hohenzollern (23 October 1896 – 4 July 1965) she married Baron Egon Eyrl von und zu Waldgries und Liebenaich on 27 November 1924. They have four children:
  - Baroness Veronika Eyrl von und zu Waldgries und Liebenaich (15 August 1926 – 13 August 1942) she died at the age of 15.
  - Baroness Stephanie Eyrl von und zu Waldgries und Liebenaich (17 December 1930 – 19 January 1998) she married Josef von Zallinger-Stillendorf on 27 November 1950. They have four children.
  - Baroness Elisabeth Eyrl von und zu Waldgries und Liebenaich (15 May 1932 – 8 July 2011) she married Bernhard Baron von Hohenbuhel gennant Heufler of Rasen on 9 August 1954. They have six children.
  - Baron Carl Josef Eyrl von und zu Waldgries und Liebenaich (19 January 1935) he married Countess Isabelle Ceschi a Santa Croce on 12 April 1975. They have four children.
- Prince Albrecht Ludwig Leopold Tassilo of Hohenzollern (28 September 1898 – 30 July 1977) he married Ilse Margot von Friedeburg on 19 May 1921. They have five children:
  - Princess Josephine Wilhelma of Hohenzollern-Sigmaringen (15 February 1922 – 11 July 2006)
  - Princess Luise-Dorothea of Hohenzollern-Sigmaringen (9 February 1924 – 11 November 1988) she married Count Egbert of Plettenberg on 11 June 1947. They have seven children.
  - Princess Rose-Margarethe of Hohenzollern-Sigmaringen (19 February 1930 – 16 February 2005) she married Edgar Pfersdorf on 15 September 1955. They have four children.
  - Princess Maria of Hohenzollern-Sigmaringen (1 April 1935 – 1 April 1935) she died in infancy.
  - Prince Godehard-Friedrich of Hohenzollern-Sigmaringen (17 April 1939 – 21 May 2001) he married Heide Hansen on 29 August 1971. They have two children.
- Princess Henriette Leopoldine Wilhelmine of Hohenzollern-Sigmaringen (29 September 1907 – 3 October 1907) she died at four days old.

== Honours and awards ==
German orders and decorations

- Hohenzollern: Cross of Honour of the Princely House Order of Hohenzollern, 1st Class with Swords
- Prussia:
  - Knight of the Red Eagle, 1st Class, 20 October 1890; Grand Cross with Swords
  - Grand Commander's Cross of the Royal House Order of Hohenzollern
  - Iron Cross (1914), 1st Class
  - Long Service Award
- (Duchy of Anhalt) Anhalt: Grand Cross of Albert the Bear, 1889
- Baden:
  - Knight of the House Order of Fidelity, 1900
  - Grand Cross of the Order of Berthold the First, 1900
- Bavaria:
  - Knight of St. Hubert, 1905
  - Grand Cross of the Military Merit Order
- (Saxe-Coburg and Gotha) (Duchy of Saxe-Altenburg) (Saxe-Meiningen) Ernestine duchies: Grand Cross of the Saxe-Ernestine House Order
- Mecklenburg-Strelitz: Cross for Distinction in War
- Saxe-Weimar-Eisenach: Grand Cross of the White Falcon

Foreign orders and decorations

- Austria-Hungary: Grand Cross of the Imperial Order of Leopold, 1900
- Belgium: Grand Cordon of the Order of Leopold, 1894
- Empire of Japan:
  - Grand Cordon of the Order of the Chrysanthemum
  - Service Cross
- Sovereign Military Order of Malta: Grand Cross of Honour and Devotion
- Ottoman Empire:
  - Order of Osmanieh, 1st Class
  - Gold Imtiyaz Medal
- Kingdom of Portugal:
  - Grand Cross of the Sash of the Two Orders
  - Grand Cross of the Tower and Sword, with Collar
- Kingdom of Romania:
  - Grand Cross of the Star of Romania
  - Grand Cross of the Crown of Romania
  - Military Virtue Cross, 1st Class
- United Kingdom: Honorary Grand Cross of the Royal Victorian Order, 28 January 1907 (expelled in 1915)

== Ancestry ==
Ancestors of Prince Karl Anton of Hohenzollern (born 1868)

8. Karl, Prince of Hohenzollern-Sigmaringen
4. Karl Anton, Prince of Hohenzollern
9. Marie Antoinette Murat
2. Leopold, Prince of Hohenzollern
10. Charles, Grand Duke of Baden
5. Princess Josephine of Baden
11. Stéphanie de Beauharnais
1. Prince Karl Anton of Hohenzollern
12. Prince Ferdinand of Saxe-Coburg and Gotha
6. Fernando II of Portugal
13. Princess Maria Antonia Koháry of Csábrág and Szitnya
3. Infanta Antónia of Portugal
14. Pedro I of Brazil and IV of Portugal
7. Maria II of Portugal
15. Archduchess Leopoldina of Austria
