= Sceptre of the Dragon =

Piece of the Portuguese Crown Jewels

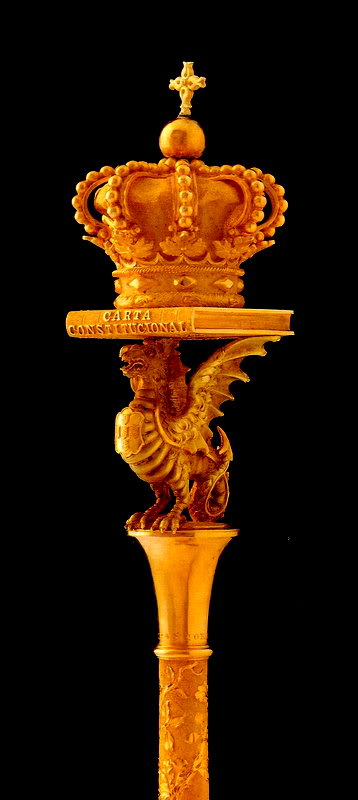
The Sceptre of the Dragon.

The Sceptre of the Dragon (properly a wyvern, in Portuguese serpe alada), also known as the Sceptre of the Crown and Constitution (Portuguese: Ceptro do Dragão; Ceptro da Coroa e da Carta Constitucional), is a piece of the Portuguese Crown Jewels, originally created for the acclamation of Queen Maria II.

== History ==
The Sceptre of the Dragon was commissioned in 1828 and was made of pure gold, in London, England. The Sceptre of the Dragon, along with all the other Portuguese Crown Jewels, are kept in the Ajuda National Palace, though they are not on display to the public.

== Details ==
The sceptre bears several symbols of the Kingdom of Portugal:

- Crown of João VI - The crown of the monarchs of Portugal and a symbol of the monarchy's power and authority
- Portuguese Constitution of 1826 - The then constitution of Portugal, which returned Portugal to a constitutional monarchy and symbolizes the power that people hold under the new regime
- Dragon - The wyvern, emblem of the House of Braganza, then the royal house of Portugal

== See also ==
- Sceptre of the Armillary

== Sources ==
- Jóias da Coroa Portuguesa
