= Mantle of Amélie of Orléans =

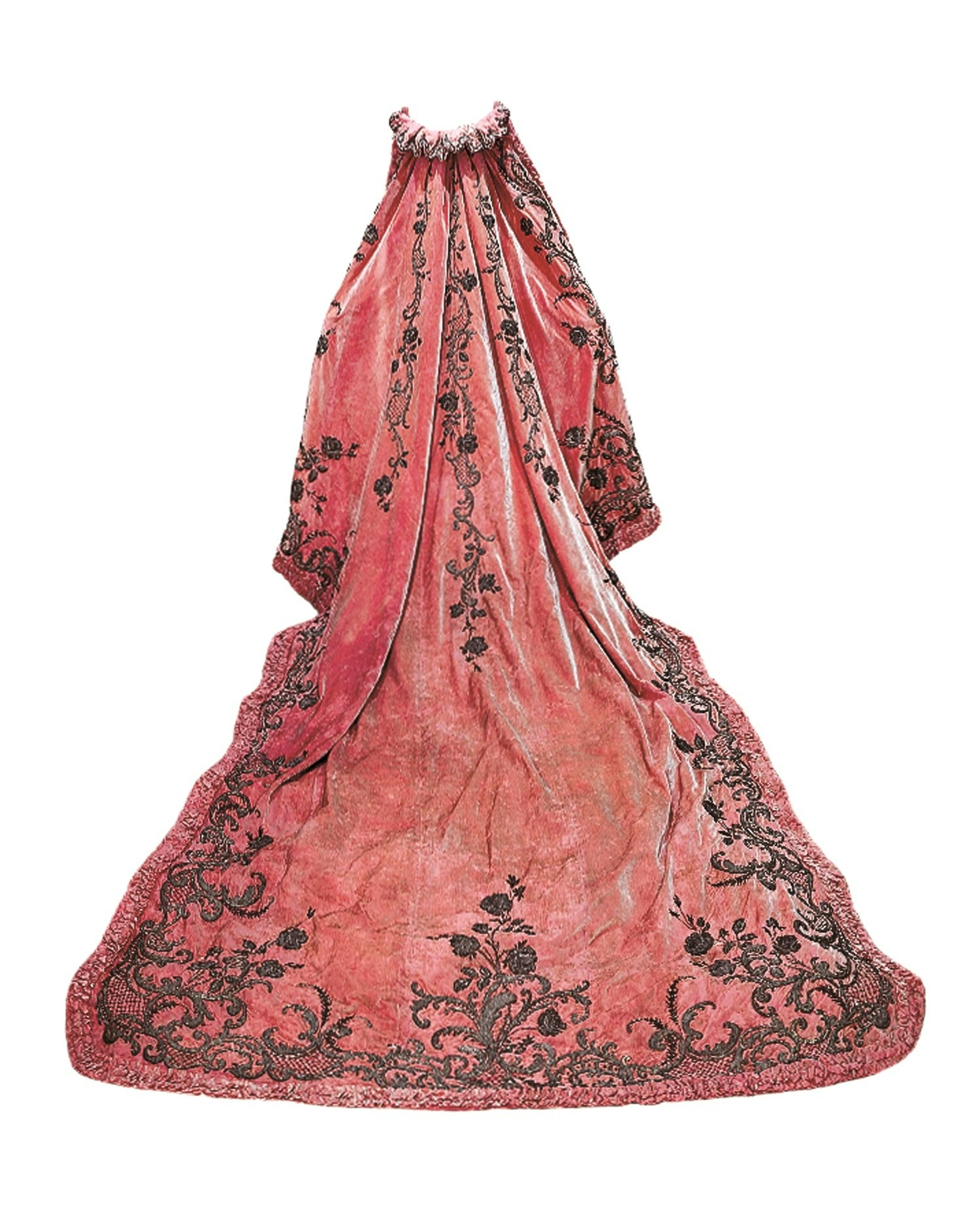
Mantle of Amélie of Orléans.

The Mantle of Amélie of Orléans is a royal garment, part of the Portuguese Crown Jewels, that was fashioned for Queen Amélie of Portugal, consort of King Carlos I of Portugal.

== History ==
The mantle was a gift of the city of Paris to the Queen upon her marriage to Carlos, Prince Royal of Portugal in 1886. She is known to have worn it on only two occasions: on 4 July 1892, during the ceremony at Necessidades Palace in which she was presented with the Golden Rose, conferred to her by Pope Leo XIII; and on 21 March 1899, during a gala reception at the Palace of Ajuda to celebrate her son Luís Filipe, Prince Royal's 12th birthday.

The mantle has been kept in the National Coach Museum, in Lisbon, since 1936. In 2018, as it was showing evident signs of deterioration (several tears, the silver embroidery had oxidised, the rose-coloured velvet had taken on a brownish tinge), it underwent restoration. The necessary 6 thousand euros were donated by the Versailles Foundation, having been secured by the personal commitment of Duarte Pio, Duke of Braganza, Queen Amélie's godson.

== Details ==
It is made of rose-coloured velvet with a satin lining in the same colour, and decorated with delicate silver embroidery in phytomorphic motifs all around; the edge is trimmed with satin frills.

== See also ==
- Mantle of Luís I
