= Necklace of the Stars =

Diamond necklace

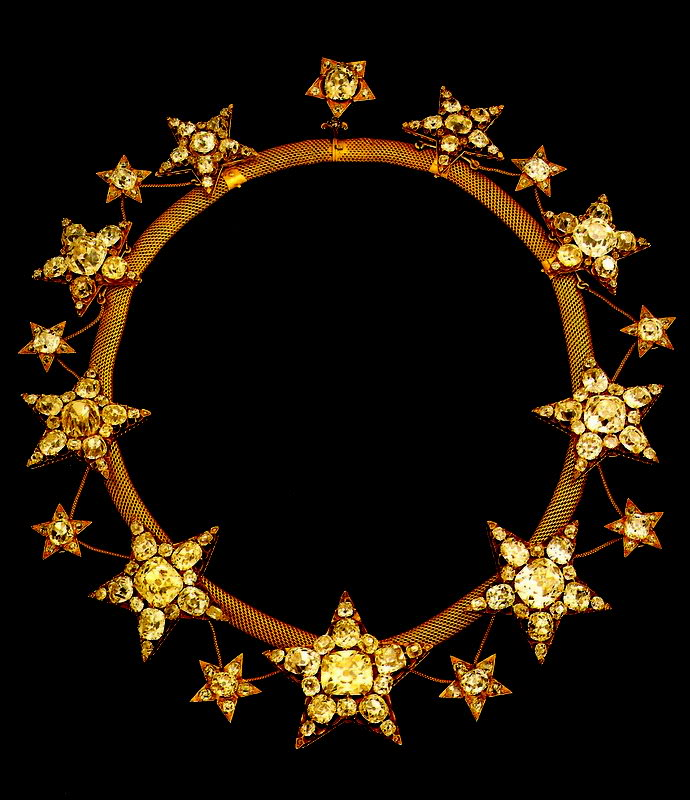
The Necklace of the Stars.

The Necklace of the Stars (Portuguese: Colar das Estrelas) is a diamond necklace originally made for Queen Consort Maria Pia of Savoy. It is a piece of the Portuguese Crown Jewels.

== History ==
The Necklace of the Stars was made in 1865 for the wife of King Luís I of Portugal, Queen Consort Maria Pia of Savoy, who had a love for jewelry and fashion. The necklace was fashioned in the workshop of the Portuguese Royal Jeweler in Lisbon, Portugal. The necklace is just a piece of a whole set of jewelry that was commissioned by Maria Pia, which includes the famed Diadem of the Stars, the counterpart of the necklace.

== Details ==
It is fashioned out of gold and colourless and pink diamonds.

== See also ==
- Diadem of the Stars
- Portuguese Crown Jewels
