= Museon =

Coordinates: 52°5′21″N 4°16′49″E

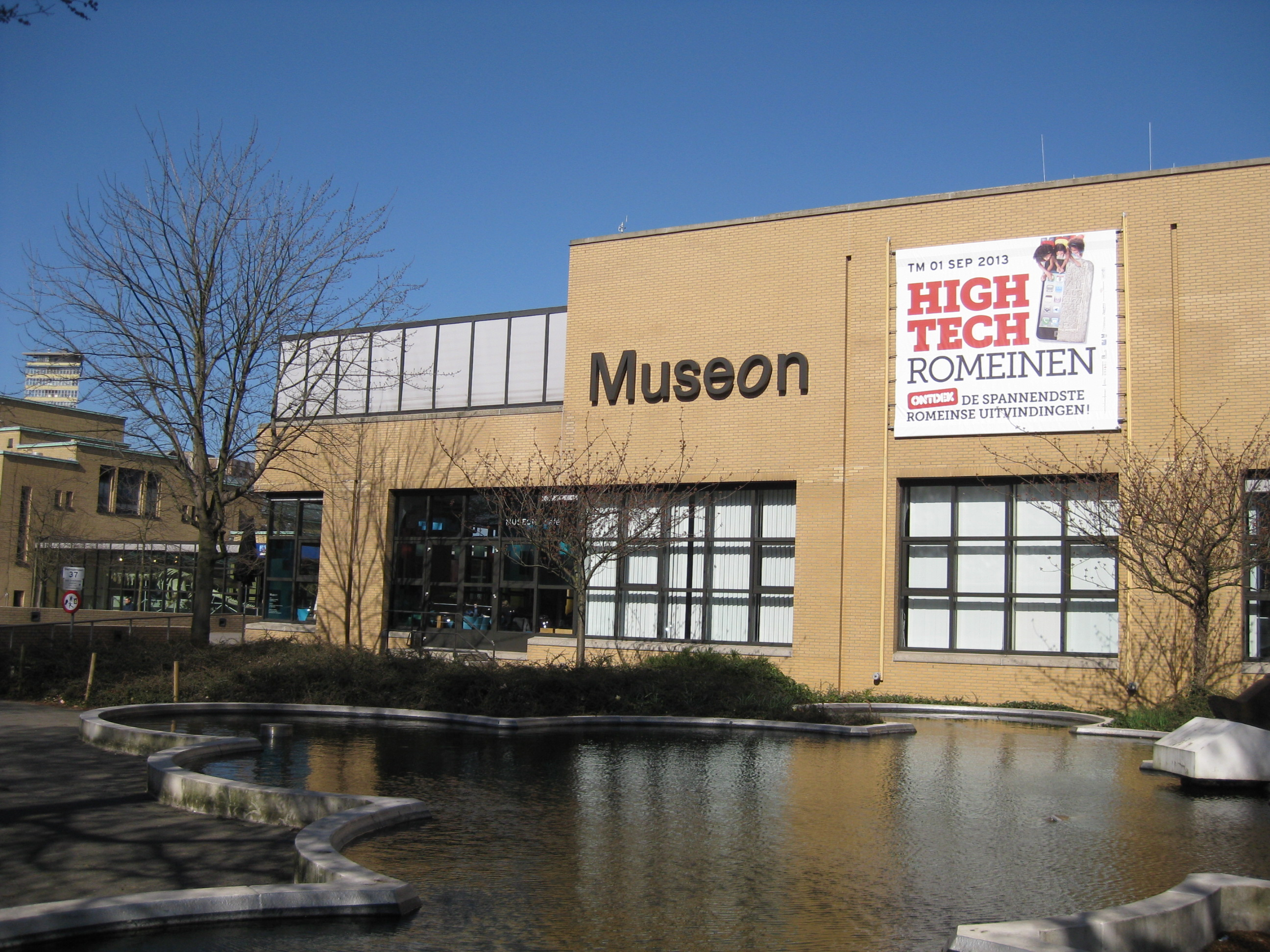
Museon museum of science, The Hague, Netherlands.

Museon is a museum for science and culture in The Hague, Netherlands, with a strong focus on education. It regularly presents exhibitions on a range of topics related to the environment, geography or cultural identity. It has an extensive collections in the domains of geology, biology, archaeology, history, science and ethnology. The name Museon is a shortening of the museum's original extended Dutch name - Museum ten bate van het Onderwijs. Since 2022, the museum has been merged with the nearby cinema Omniversum, and goes by the name Museon-Omniversum: One Planet

== Origin ==
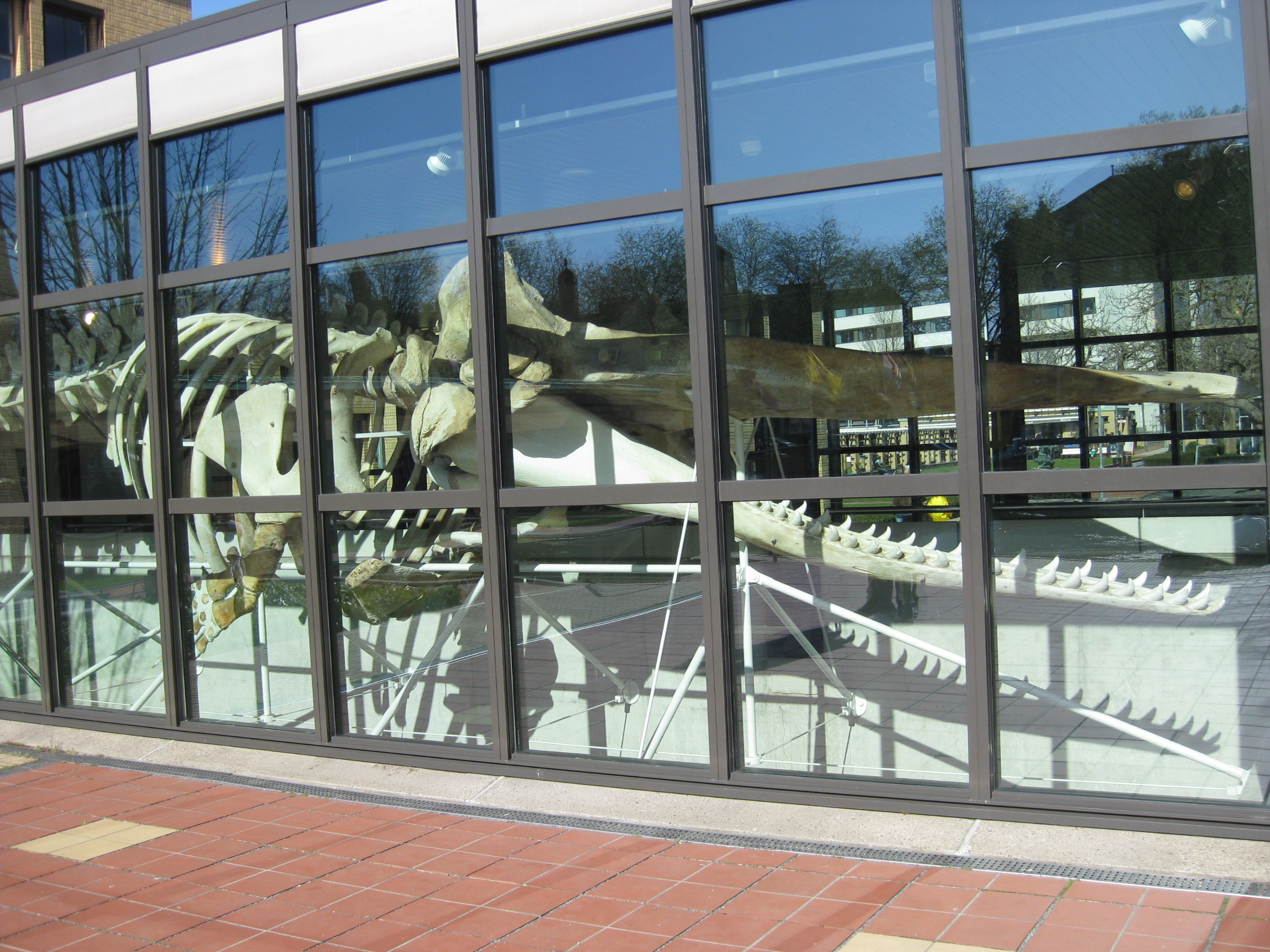
Whale skeleton in lobby viewed from outside.

The museum was initiated in 1904 by the newspaper director Frits van Paasschen, who wanted to establish a museum where children could learn about industry. Although science and technology became important domains for the museum, the original idea has never been realized. Under the museum's first director, the geologist Herman van Cappelle, the collection policy moved towards natural history and ethnology. However, Van Paasschen's concept of a museum with a strong educational mission was implemented from the very beginning. From its start the museum organised lessons for school classes, based on the items that form part the museum's collection. Around 1910 the museum was also the first organisation in The Netherlands that programmed educational movies, an initiative that led to the foundation of the first school cinema in the country.

== Municipal museum ==
Starting as a private museum the ‘Museum for Education’ was taken over by the municipality of The Hague in 1920. In 1933, biologist Niko Tinbergen, provided the museum with a collection of objects from the Inuit in Greenland. The museum moved several times, until the municipality had its present building built in 1985, by the design by architect WG Quist. The name Museon also dates from 1985. In 1997 the museum was set up as a private body, although its principal funder remains the council of Den Haag.

== Mission ==
Museon hosts educational exhibitions and programmes to communicate with a broad audience. A large part of all visitors are school children. Museon aims at transferring knowledge about man and his relation with nature and culture and provides easily accessible information about topical themes and developments in science and society. Currently the collection counts around 273,000 objects.

== 2002 Portuguese Crown Jewels theft ==
In 2002 a large part of the Portuguese Crown Jewels were stolen from the Museon. They were on loan for an exhibition on European Crown Jewels. Following an investigation by the museum and Dutch authorities, the Dutch government paid a sum of six million euros to the Portuguese government for reparation.
