= Namedy Castle =

Rhine valley castle, Germany

Coordinates: 50°27′22″N 7°21′24″E

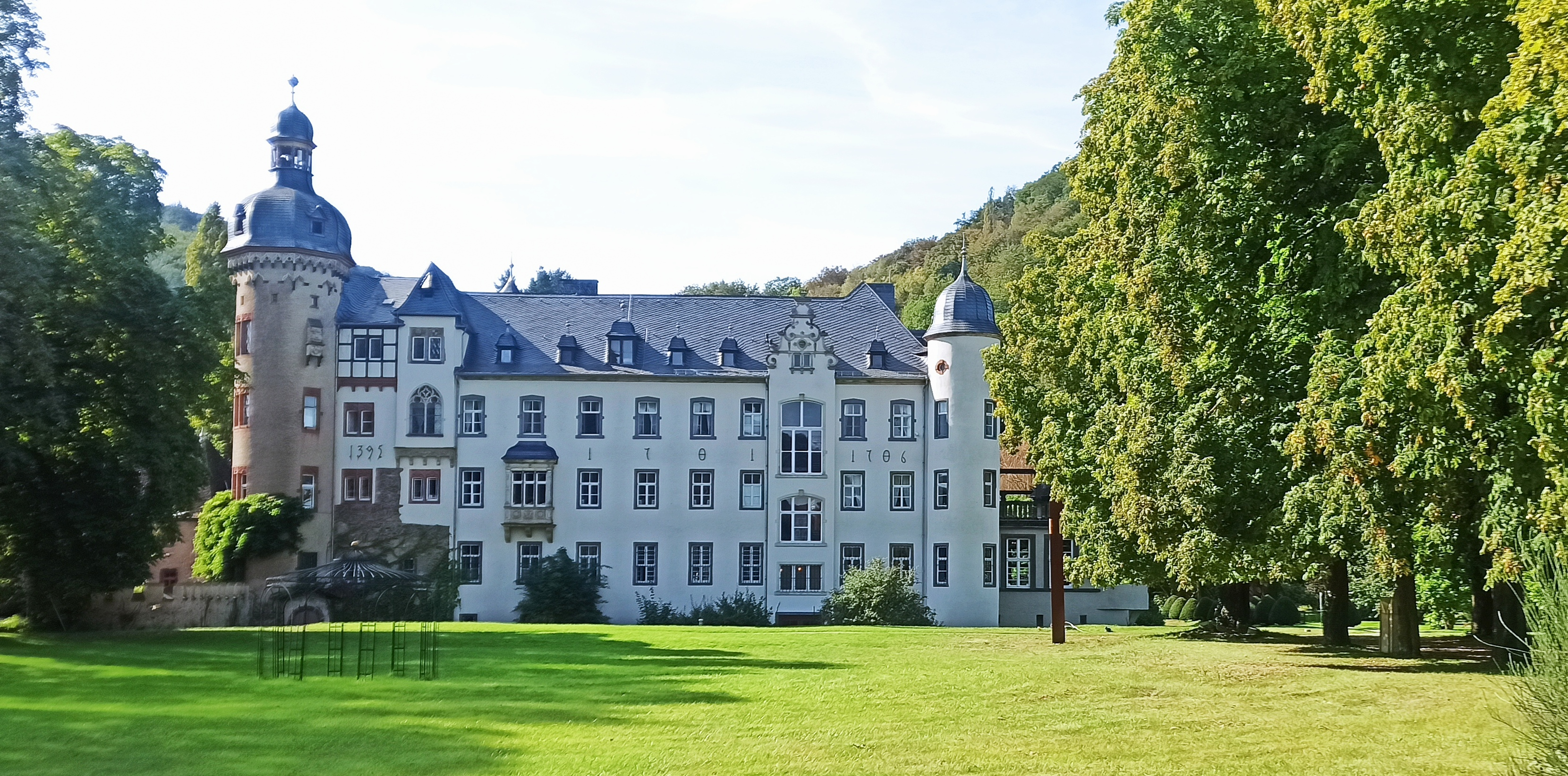
Castle and park, 2023

Namedy castle location

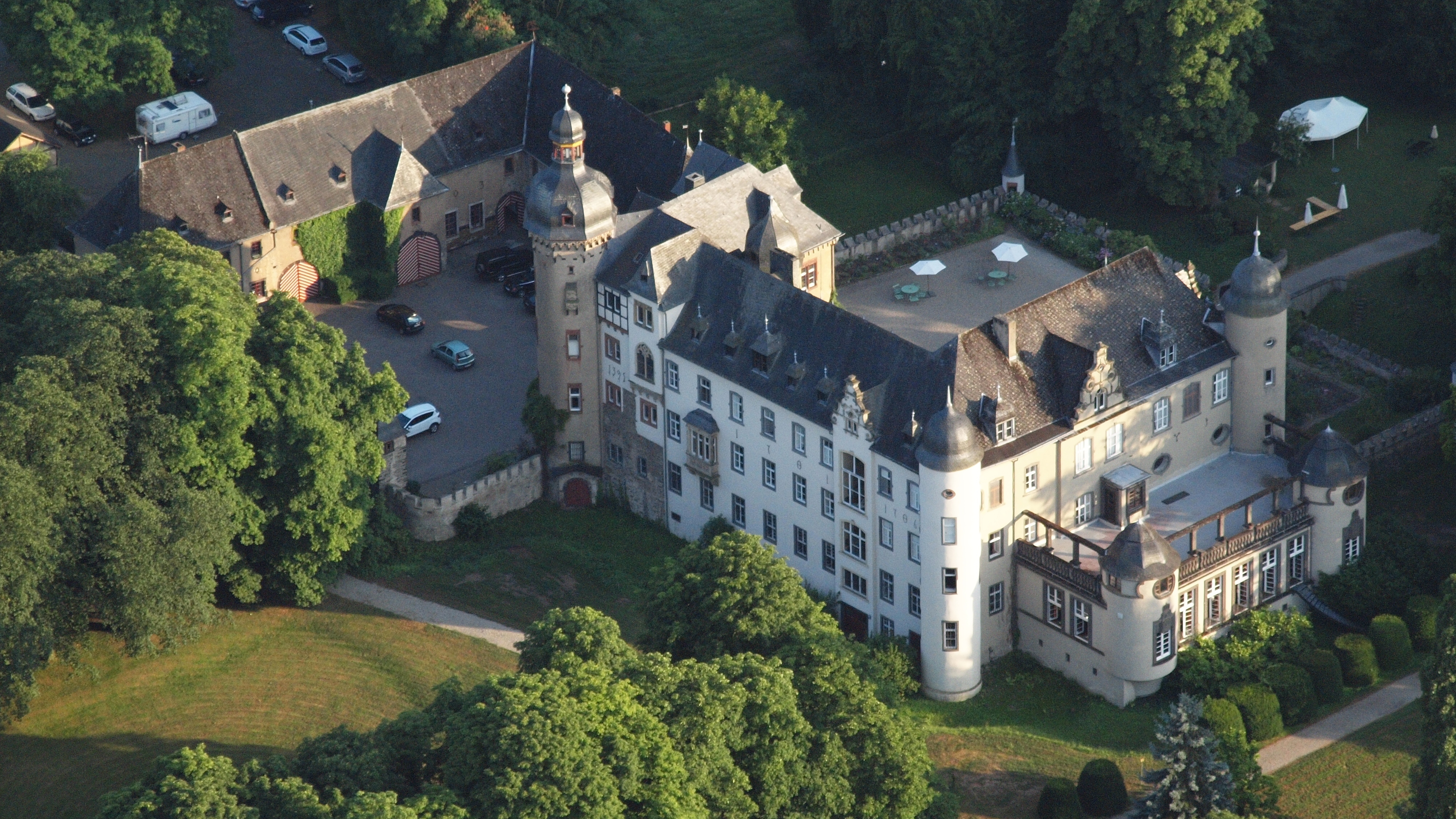
Bird's-eye view

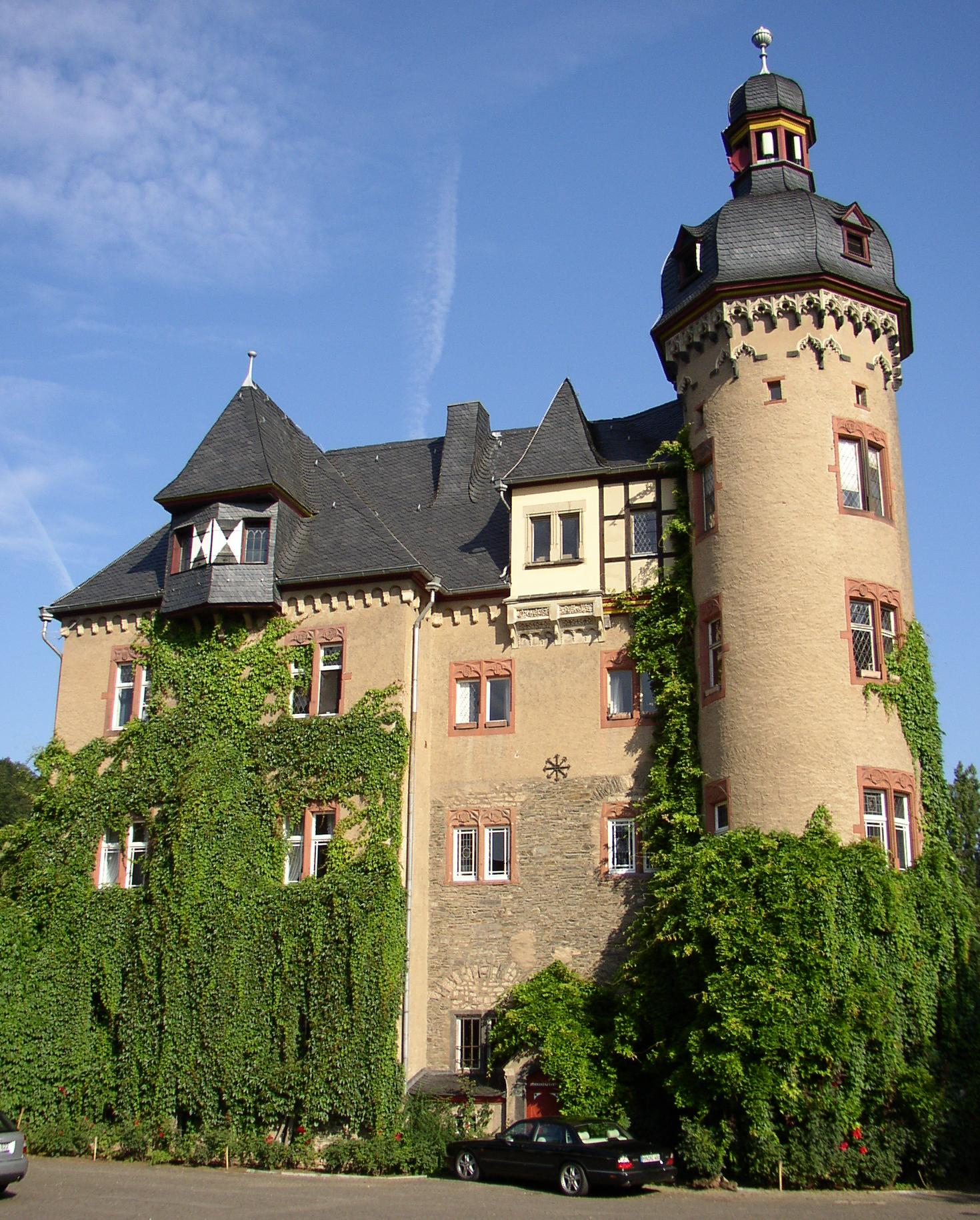
South view

Namedy Castle (or Burg Namedy) is located in the Rhine valley, close to the village of Namedy in Andernach, Germany. Late gothic, moated castle (middle of the 14th century) originally belonging to the Husmann Knights of Andernach.

Since 1909 in possession of the Rhenish line of the Hohenzollern dynasty.

== Geographical location ==
The castle is located down in the Rhine valley on the left side of the river, north of the village of Namedy. The first wooded hills of the Eifel highlands rises just behind the castle. The Eurovelo 15 cycleway which follows the Rhine river on both banks, runs beside the castle park as part of the section from Koblenz to Bonn. The Eifel-Camino hiking trail passes also there. The latter at this location, is close to its starting point linking the Rhine valley with Trier, and further with the French and Spanish networks of pilgrims' ways to Santiago de Compostela.

== History ==
=== Late gothic castle ===
The history of its construction goes back to the 14th century when the castle was built by the Husmanns, a patrician family from Andernach. It was a small moated castle in the late gothic style, which included the noble court of Niederhof. Gerhardus dictus Husmann (died 1211) was the first lord of that court.

During the 16th century, the buildings were extended by later generations of the H(a)usmann family.

In 1633, the castle suffered from plundering by Swedish troops during the Thirty Years' War.

After the male line became extinct in 1678, the castle passed into the hands of the von Klepping family through marriage, before its new owners sold it in 1700.

=== Baroque castle ===
Johann Arnold von Solemacher (1657–1734), chancellor of the electorate of Trier, bought the castle in 1700 for 7,500 Reichstaler. He was granted a knighthood in 1718 by Charles VI, Holy Roman Emperor, after appending to his name, the labels and coat of arms of the ancient family, Husmann von Namedy. Johann Arnold transformed the medieval buildings into a baroque style pleasure palace, adding stories and two side wings.

The Solemacher family inhabited the castle until they had to flee before the advancing French army who, in 1794, occupied the region left of the Rhine. French revolutionary troops used the castle as hospital and as powder magazine, which ruined its interiors and structures. Windows, stairs, floors and doors were used as fuel for heating the field hospital.

After renovation in 1856, the castle had several owners during the 19th century, among them were wealthy people of the industrial era.

=== 20th and 21st centuries ===
Finally, Prince Karl Anton of Hohenzollern-Sigmaringen bought the castle in 1909 and gave its today's (2021) look. Karl-Anton was a lieutenant general in the service of the kingdom of Prussia, married to Princess Joséphine Caroline of Belgium, who was a sister of King Albert I of Belgium. The couple loved Namedy which also had the advantage of being equidistant to the home towns of both families: Brussels and Sigmaringen. The couple added a hall of mirrors to the castle, flanked by 2 corner towers.

During World War I, Princess Josephine sat up a hospital within the hall of mirrors, while Karl-Anton participated in the chaos of that terrible war. When he returned home to Namedy in 1918, he found the castle occupied by American soldiers who, at that time, showed their hostility towards him and towards the castle's interior. He died in Namedy in 1919 at the age of 51, as a result of his ill health caused by his war service on several fronts.

Karl-Anton's son, Albrecht, Prince of Hohenzollern, took over and dealt with the necessary restorations of the castle.

In 1988 the grandson of Karl-Anton, Godehard Prince of Hohenzollern, developed the castle into a cultural centre. Since his death in 2001 it has been in the care of his widow, Princess Heide of Hohenzollern. The cultural programme includes concerts, theatrical performances and art exhibitions, for example, the "Kultursommer Rheinland-Pfalz" (Summer of Culture) event. Namedy Castle and its castle park can also be used for various private celebrations and professional events.
