= Sceptre of the Armillary =

Sceptre in the Portuguese Crown Jewels

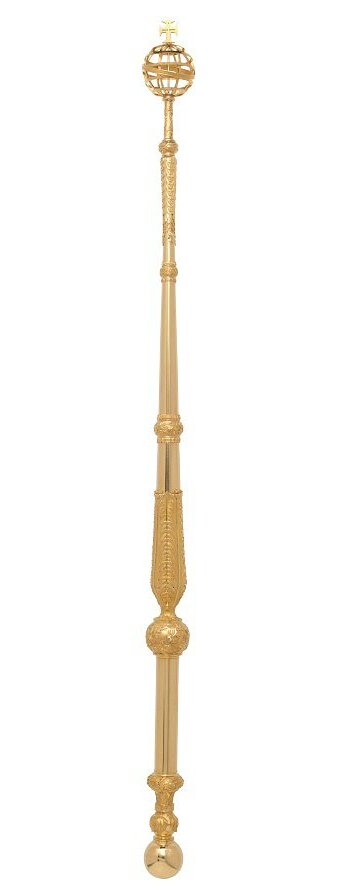
The Sceptre of the Armillary.

The Sceptre of the Armillary, also known as the Sceptre of the United Kingdom of Portugal, Brazil, and the Algarves (Portuguese: Ceptro Armilar; Ceptro do Reino Unido de Portugal, do Brasil, e dos Algarves), is a piece of the Portuguese Crown Jewels, originally created for the acclamation of King João VI, alongside the Crown of João VI and the Mantle of João VI.

== History ==
The Sceptre of the Armillary was commissioned in 1817 and was made of pure gold, in the workshop of the Royal Jeweler, Dom António Gomes da Silva, in Rio de Janeiro. The Sceptre of the Armillary, along with all the other Portuguese Crown Jewels, are kept in the Ajuda National Palace, though they are not on display to the public.

== Details ==
The sceptre bears several symbols of the United Kingdom of Portugal, Brazil, and the Algarves, for which João VI was monarch of during João VI's stay in Brazil.

- Armillary Sphere - Originally a symbol of King Manuel I of Portugal, it also became a symbol of Colonial Brazil. After the creation of the United Kingdom of Portugal, Brazil, and the Algarves, it became the pluri-continental symbol of Portugal and Brazil and appeared on its flag.
- Order of Christ Cross - A symbol of the Order of Christ, the Portuguese successor of the Knights Templar. A longtime symbol of Portugal, it appeared on the Portuguese real, the sails of Portuguese ships during the Age of Discoveries, and various flags and coats of arms of Portuguese institutions.

== See also ==
- Sceptre of the Dragon

== Sources ==
- Jóias da Coroa Portuguesa
