= Diadem of the Stars =

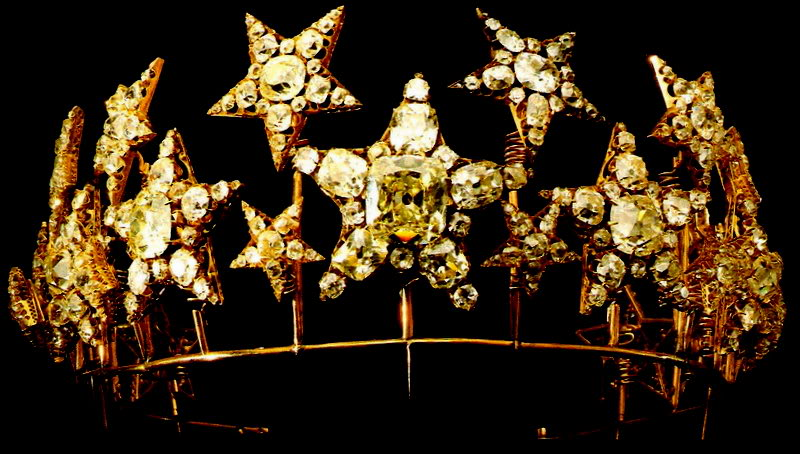
The Diadem of the Stars.

The Diadem of the Stars (Portuguese: Diadema das Estrelas) is a diamond tiara originally commissioned by Queen Consort Maria Pia of Savoy, who had a love for jewellery and fashion. It is a piece of the Portuguese Crown Jewels.

== History ==
The diadem was made in 1863 for Queen Consort Maria Pia of Savoy, wife of King Luís I of Portugal. The tiara was fashioned in the workshop of the Portuguese Royal Jeweller, Estêvão de Sousa, in Lisbon, Portugal. The tiara is just a piece of a whole set of jewellery that was commissioned by Maria Pia, which includes the Necklace of the Stars, the counterpart of the diadem.

== Details ==
The Diadem of the Stars was made in the workshop of the Portuguese Royal Jeweler in Lisbon, Portugal. Commissioned in 1863, the tiara took three years before it was completed in 1866. It is fashioned out of gold, silver, and colourless diamonds, with the largest stone in the circlet a yellow diamond called the Maria Pia.

== Sources ==
- Jóias da Coroa Portuguesa (in Portuguese)
