= Mantle of João VI =

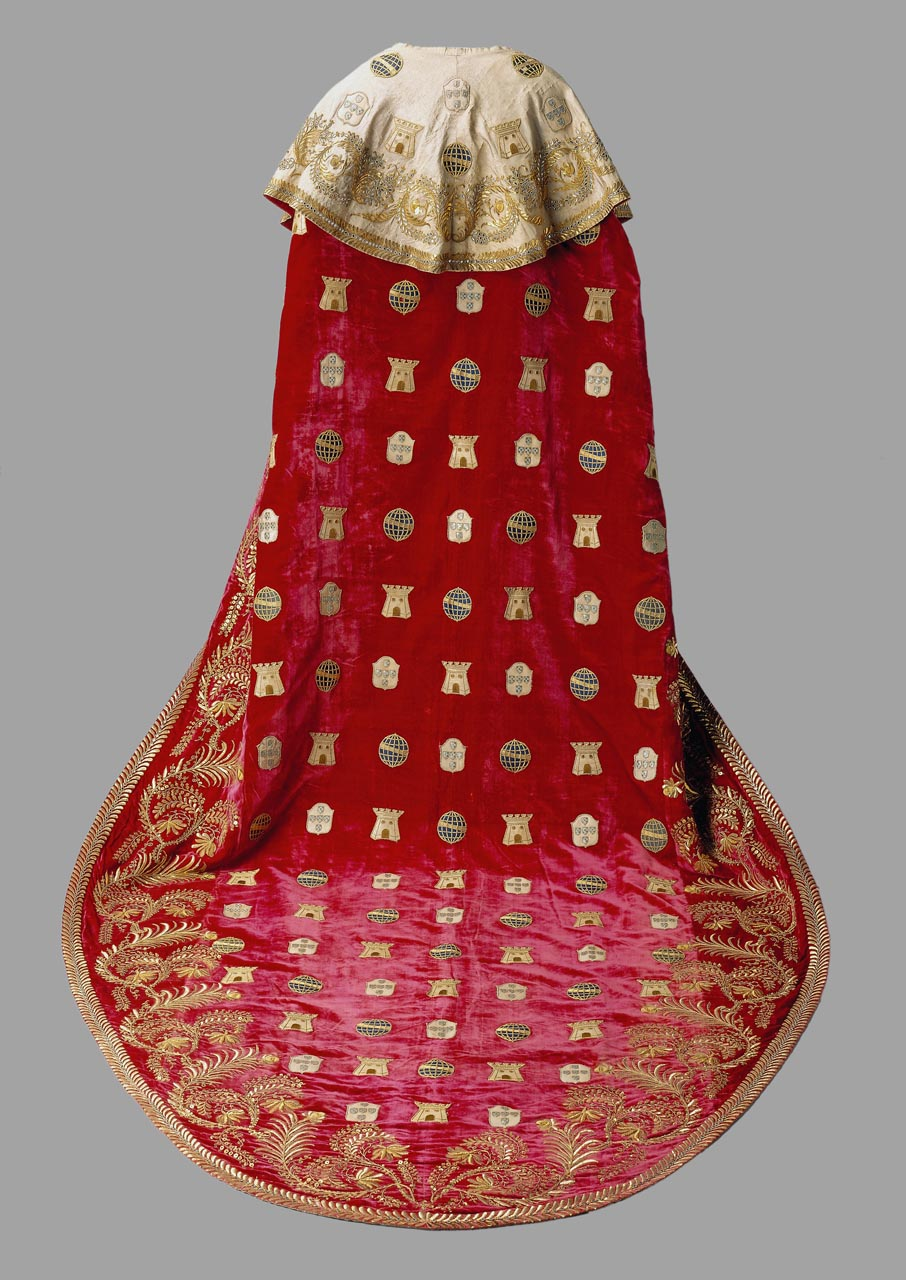
The mantle of John VI of Portugal.

The mantle of John VI, also known as the Mantle of the United Kingdom of Portugal, Brazil, and the Algarves (Portuguese: Manto de João VI; Manto do Reino Unido de Portugal, do Brasil, e dos Algarves), is the royal robe, a part of the Portuguese Crown Jewels, that was fashioned for the acclamation of King João VI, alongside the Crown of João VI and the Sceptre of the Armillary.

== History ==
The Mantle of João VI was created for the acclamation of João VI as King. It was fashioned in Portugal, even though João VI was in Brazil, for Portugal was encaged in the Peninsular War. The robe was only used only by João VI.

== Details ==
The mantle was made in Portugal for João VI's acclamation. It is fashioned out of velvet, silk, ermine, wire rod, sequins, and various precious jewels. The design of the robe bears several symbols of the United Kingdom of Portugal, Brazil, and the Algarves, for which João VI was monarch of during João VI's stay in Brazil.

- Armillary Sphere - Originally a symbol of King Manuel I of Portugal, it also became a symbol of Colonial Brazil. After the creation of the United Kingdom of Portugal, Brazil, and the Algarves, it became the pluricontinental symbol of Portugal and Brazil and appeared on its flag.
- Castle - Said to symbolize the castles of the seven Moorish Kings that Afonso I of Portugal conquered, the castles are found on the Coat of arms of Portugal.
- Shield with Five Escutcheons - Originally symbolizing Portugal's right to issue currency as an independent nation, the symbol was commonly used as a simplified version of the Portuguese coat of arms.

== See also ==
- Mantle of Luís I

== Sources ==
- Jóias da Coroa Portuguesa
