= Princess Joséphine Caroline of Belgium =

Princess Joséphine Caroline
- Princess Karl Anton of Hohenzollern
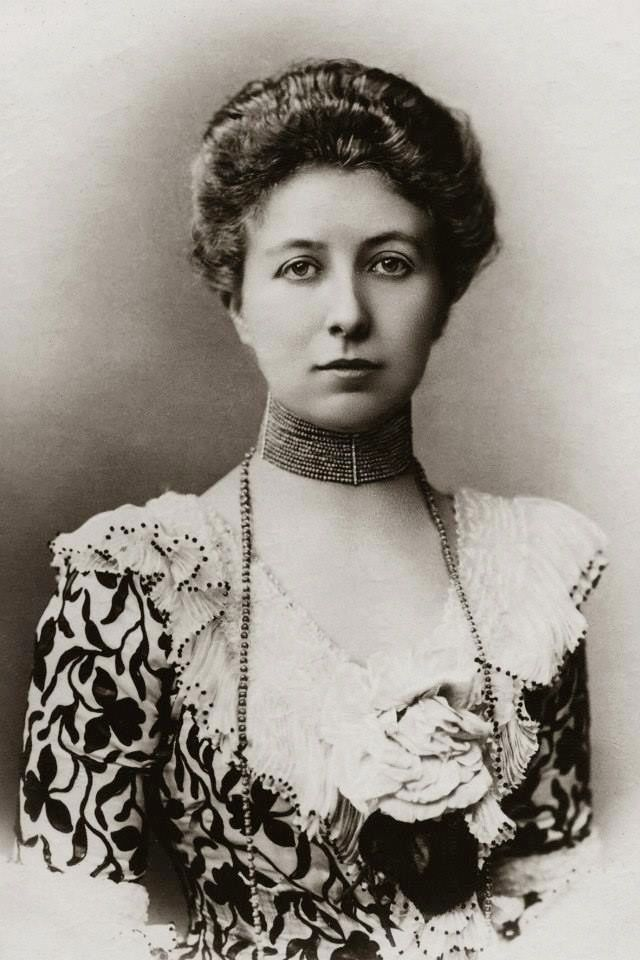
- Photograph c. late 1890s
- Born: 18 October 1872; Brussels, Belgium
- Died: 6 January 1958 (aged 85); Namur, Belgium
- Spouse: Prince Karl Anton of Hohenzollern (m. 1894; died 1919)
- Issue: Princess Stephanie; Princess Marie Antoinette; Prince Albrecht; Princess Henriette
Names
- French: Joséphine Caroline Marie Albertine; Dutch: Josephine Caroline Maria Albertina
- House: Saxe-Coburg and Gotha
- Father: Prince Philippe, Count of Flanders
- Mother: Princess Marie of Hohenzollern-Sigmaringen

Princess Joséphine Caroline of Belgium (18 October 1872 – 6 January 1958) was the youngest daughter of Prince Philippe, Count of Flanders and Princess Marie of Hohenzollern-Sigmaringen. She was also the sister of Albert I of Belgium.

== Biography ==
Joséphine Caroline married her maternal first cousin Prince Karl Anton of Hohenzollern-Sigmaringen on 28 May 1894 in Brussels. He was the youngest son of her mother's oldest brother, Leopold, Prince of Hohenzollern. Their relationship was described as a happy one. They lived in Namedy Castle on the Rhine which they had purchased in 1909. During World War I, she made her home a military hospital for wounded soldiers while her husband served as a Prussian lieutenant general. Exhausted from years of warfare, he died shortly after his return to Namedy in 1919, at age 51. In 1935, Joséphine Caroline entered a Benedictine convent in Namur, taking the name of Sister Marie-Josephine, and remained a nun for the rest of her life. She is buried in the Couvent des Soeurs de Notre-Dame (Convent of the Sisters of Our Lady) in Namur.

=== Marriage and issue ===
On 28 May 1894 in Brussels, she married her maternal first cousin Prince Karl Anton of Hohenzollern-Sigmaringen, later simply of Hohenzollern (1 September 1868, Sigmaringen – 21 February 1919, Namedy), third son of Leopold, Prince of Hohenzollern-Sigmaringen, later simply of Hohenzollern and Infanta Antónia of Portugal. They had the following children;

- Princess Stephanie Josephine Karola Philippine Leopoldine Marie of Hohenzollern (8 April 1895, Potsdam – 7 August 1975, Dießen am Ammersee) she married Prince Joseph-Ernst Fugger of Glött on 18 May 1920 and they were divorced on 25 May 1943.
- Princess Marie Antoinette Wilhelmine Auguste Viktoria of Hohenzollern (Potsdam, 23 October 1896 – Bolzano, 4 July 1965) she married Baron Egon Eyrl von und zu Waldgries und Liebenaich on 27 November 1924. They had four children:
  - Baroness Veronika Eyrl von und zu Waldgries und Liebenaich (15 August 1926 – 13 August 1942) she died at the age of fifteen.
  - Baroness Stephanie Eyrl von und zu Waldgries und Liebenaich (17 December 1930 – 19 January 1998) she married Josef von Zallinger-Stillendorf on 27 November 1950. They have four children.
  - Baroness Elisabeth Eyrl von und zu Waldgries und Liebenaich (15 May 1932 – 8 July 2011) she married Bernhard Baron von Hohenbuhel gennant Heufler of Rasen on 9 August 1954. They have six children.
  - Baron Carl Josef Eyrl von und zu Waldgries und Liebenaich (19 January 1935) he married Countess Isabelle Ceschi a Santa Croce on 12 April 1975. They have four children.
- Prince Albrecht Ludwig Leopold Tassilo of Hohenzollern (Potsdam, 28 September 1898 – Bühl, 30 July 1977) he married Ilse Margot von Friedeburg on 19 May 1921. They had five children:
  - Princess Josephine Wilhelma of Hohenzollern-Sigmaringen (Namedy, 15 February 1922 – Andernach, 11 July 2006)
  - Princess Luise-Dorothea of Hohenzollern-Sigmaringen (Namedy, 9 February 1924 – Bad Kreuznach, 11 November 1988) she married Count Egbert of Plettenberg on 11 June 1947. They have seven children.
  - Princess Rose-Margarethe of Hohenzollern-Sigmaringen (Namedy, 19 February 1930 – Neuss, 16 February 2005) she married Edgar Pfersdorf on 15 September 1955. They have four children.
  - Princess Maria of Hohenzollern-Sigmaringen (Namedy, 1 April 1935 – Namedy, 1 April 1935) she died at one day old.
  - Prince Godehard-Friedrich of Hohenzollern-Sigmaringen (Koblenz, 17 April 1939 – Namedy, 21 May 2001) he married Heide Hansen on 29 August 1971. They have two children.
- Princess Henriette Leopoldine Wilhelmine of Hohenzollern-Sigmaringen (29 September 1907 – 3 October 1907) she died at four days old.

== Honours ==
- Dame Grand Cross of the Order of Saint Isabel, 19 June 1894 (Kingdom of Portugal)
- Dame of the Order of Saint Elizabeth, 1900 – wedding Gift in honour of her brother (Kingdom of Bavaria)
- Dame of the Order of Louise (German Empire)

== Ancestry ==
Ancestors of Princess Joséphine Caroline of Belgium

8. Francis, Duke of Saxe-Coburg-Saalfeld
4. Leopold I of Belgium
9. Countess Augusta Reuss of Ebersdorf
2. Prince Philippe, Count of Flanders
10. Louis Philippe I of France
5. Princess Louise of Orléans
11. Princess Maria Amalia of Naples and Sicily
1. Princess Joséphine Caroline of Belgium
12. Karl, Prince of Hohenzollern-Sigmaringen
6. Karl Anton, Prince of Hohenzollern
13. Marie Antoinette Murat
3. Princess Marie of Hohenzollern-Sigmaringen
14. Charles, Grand Duke of Baden
7. Princess Josephine of Baden
15. Stéphanie de Beauharnais
