= Mantle of Luís I =

Royal robe, part of the Portuguese Crown Jewels

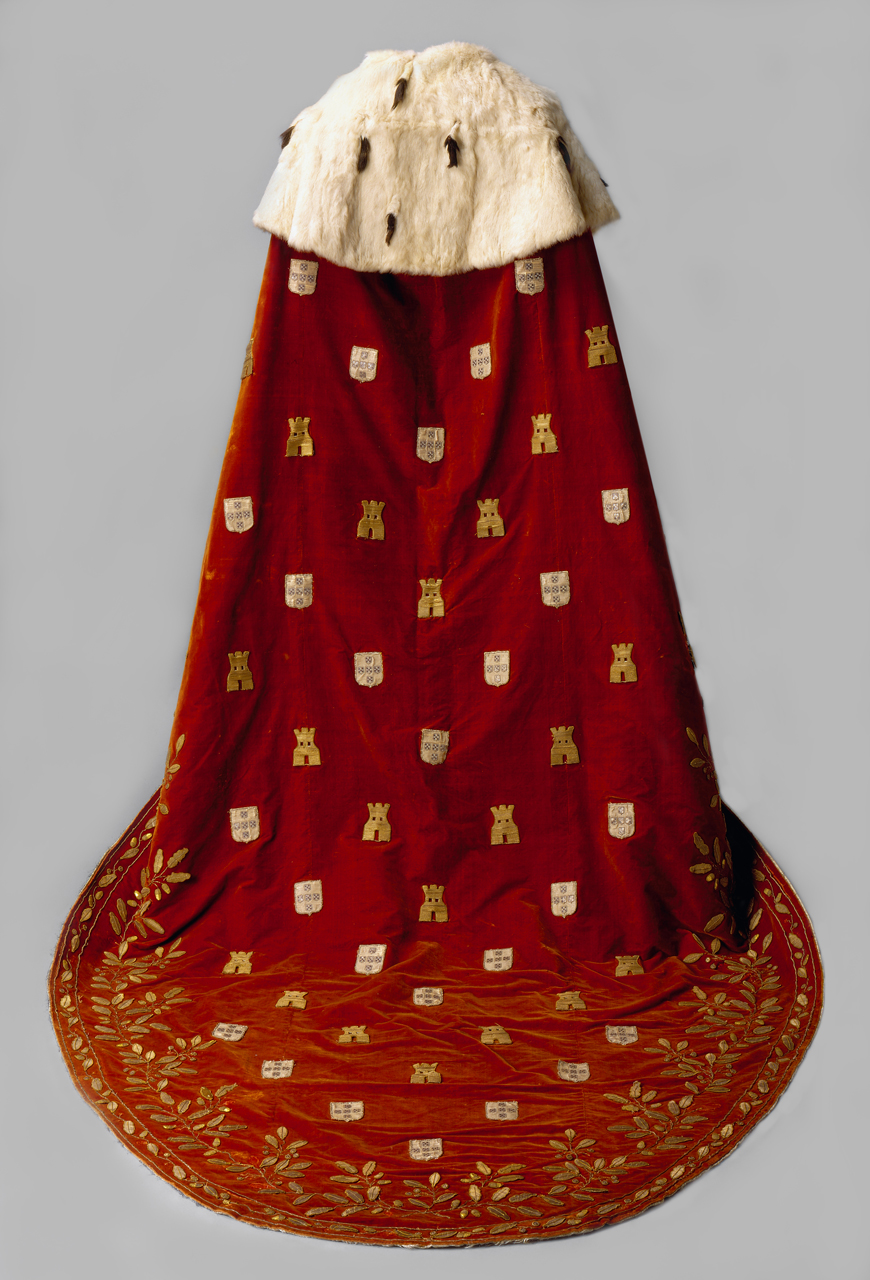
The Mantle of Luís I.

The Mantle of Luís I, also known as the Mantle of the Constitutional Kings (Portuguese: Manto de D. Luís I; Manto dos Reis Constitucionais), is the royal robe, a part of the Portuguese Crown Jewels, that was fashioned for the acclamation of King Luís I, though used by all Portuguese monarchs after him.

== History ==
The Mantle of Luís I was created for the acclamation of Luís I as King. It was fashioned in Portugal, alongside many different pieces of jewelry.

== Details ==
The mantle was made in Portugal for Luís I's acclamation. It is fashioned out of velvet, silk, ermine, gold thread, wire rod, blade, sequins, and various precious gems. The design of the robe bears several symbols of the Kingdom of Portugal.

- Castle - Said to symbolize the castles of the seven Moorish Kings that Afonso I of Portugal conquered, the castles are found on the Coat of arms of Portugal.
- Shield with Five Escutcheons - Originally symbolizing Portugal's right to issue currency as an independent nation, the symbol was commonly used as a simplified version of the Portuguese coat of arms.

== See also ==
- Mantle of João VI
- Mantle of Amélie of Orléans

== Sources ==
- Jóias da Coroa Portuguesa
