= Sash of the Two Orders =

Sash of the Two Orders Banda das Duas Ordens

Awarded by the Portuguese Head of State
- Type: State Order
- Established: 1789
- Royal house: House of Braganza
- Eligibility: Members of the Portuguese royal family Crown princes and princes of foreign royal houses Foreign heads of state
- Status: Extinct
- Former grades: Grand Cross (BDO)

Precedence
- Next (higher): Sash of the Three Orders
- Next (lower): Order of the Tower and Sword

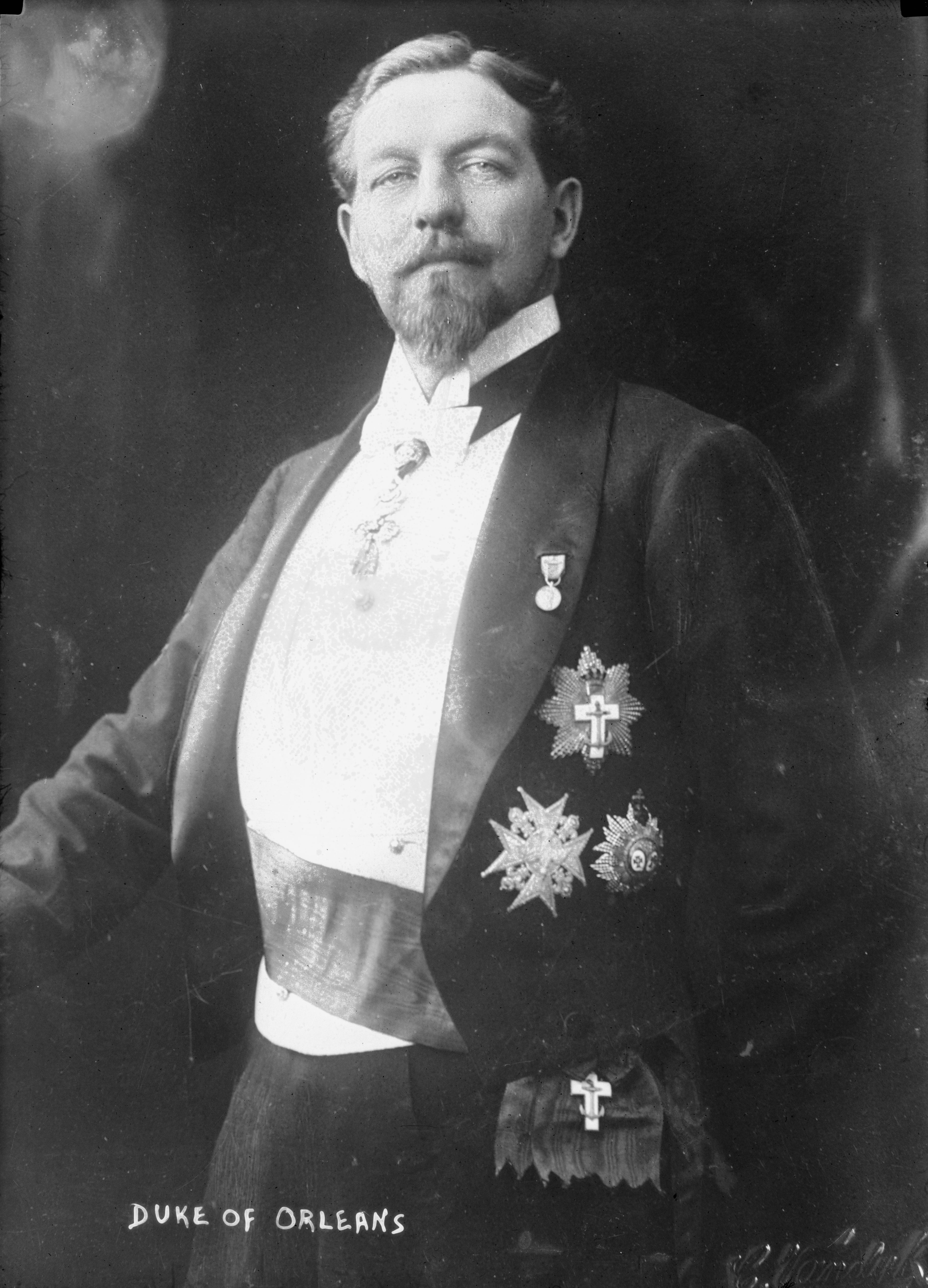
Philippe d'Orleans wearing the star of the order on the far right

The Sash of the Two Orders (Portuguese: Banda das Duas Ordens, or Banda da Grã-Cruz das Duas Ordens) was a Portuguese decoration that combined the Grand Crosses of the Military Orders of Christ and Aviz.

== History ==
The decoration was first established in 1789 by Queen Maria I, alongside the closely related Sash of the Three Orders. From 1823 onward, it was reserved for members of the Portuguese royal house who were neither the monarch nor the heir apparent (both of whom wore the Sash of the Three Orders), as well as for princes belonging to foreign royal houses.

In the wake of the 5 October 1910 revolution the Republic abolished the decoration along with all royal orders (save for the Order of the Tower and Sword), but would later resurrect it in 1931, during which it continued to be awarded to foreign heads of state and royalty. It was eventually retired for good in 1962, when the Three Orders Sash became exclusive to the President.

== Insignia ==
- The badge and star of the decoration were identical to that of the Three Orders Sash, but with only the two crosses of the Orders of Christ and Aviz. From 1825 to 1830 the cross of Aviz was replaced by the cross of the Order of St. James of the Sword, with one such decoration bestowed on Prince Maximilian of Saxony in 1825. In 1857, the decoration conferred on Prince Albert of Saxe-Coburg and Gotha had the cross of Christ replaced by that of St. James, as he had already been decorated with the Order of Christ. During the era of the monarchy the badge was surmounted by the royal crown; after 1910 the crown was replaced by a laurel wreath.
- The sash of the decoration usually constituted two equal stripes of red and green (Type I); from 1825 to 1830 the green was replaced by violet (Type II), with the red replaced by violet on Prince Albert's decoration in 1857 (Type III).

Ribbon bars
Type I (Christ and Aviz)	Type II (Christ and St. James)	Type III (Aviz and St. James)

== Notable recipients ==
=== Before 1931 ===
- Kaiser Wilhelm II
- Kronprinz Wilhelm
- Prinz Eitel Friedrich von Preußen
- King George V

=== From 1931 to 1962 ===
- Edward, Prince of Wales (25 April 1931)
- Charlotte, Grand Duchess of Luxembourg (23 January 1949)
- Farouk I, King of Egypt and the Sudan (5 May 1951)
- René Coty, 17th President of France (15 November 1954)
- Marcos Pérez Jiménez, 35th President of Venezuela (29 July 1955)
