= Portuguese crown jewels =

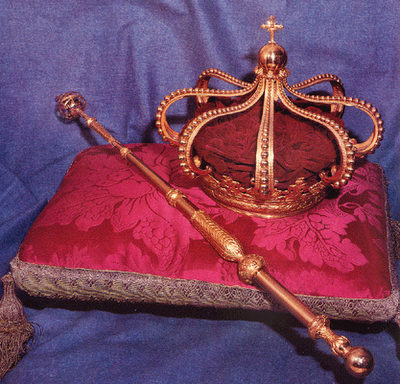
The Crown of João VI with the Sceptre of the Armillary; Ajuda National Palace

The Portuguese crown jewels (Portuguese: Joias da Coroa Portuguesa), also known as the Royal Treasure (Tesouro Real), are the pieces of jewelry, regalia, and vestments that were used by the Kings and Queens of Portugal during the time of the Portuguese Monarchy. Over the nine centuries of Portuguese history, the Portuguese crown jewels have lost and gained many pieces. Most of the current set of the Portuguese crown jewels are from the reigns of King João VI and King Luís I.

== History ==
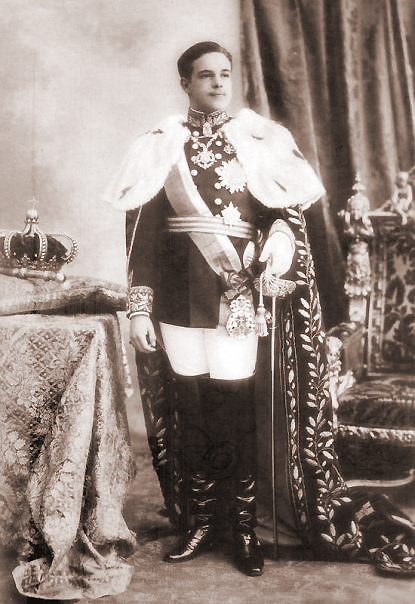
King Manuel II, wearing the Mantle of Luís I, with the Crown of João VI

By the reign of King Manuel I (1495–1521), Portugal had already a lavish set of jewels, the king having been one of the most powerful men in the world at the time and having been known to show off.

In early 1581 King António fled to France after King Philip I was made the King of Portugal. António took with him the Portuguese crown jewels, including many valuable diamonds. Being well received by the French Queen Consort, Catherine de' Medici, he sold her some of the pieces of the Portuguese crown jewels in return for France's support in his plans to reclaim the throne of Portugal and depose Philip I.

After several failed attempts to reclaim the Portuguese Crown, António fell into poverty. His poverty led him to sell many of the remaining diamonds. The last and finest diamond of the Portuguese crown jewels, the Sancy, would be acquired by Nicolas de Harlay, seigneur de Sancy,from whom it would make its way to Maximilien de Béthune, duc de Sully. From Maximilien, the diamond would finally go to join the French crown jewels.

During the Portuguese Restoration War, João II of Braganza sold many of the Portuguese crown jewels to finance the war with Spain. When João II became King of Portugal as João IV and deposed the Philippine Dynasty in 1640, he placed his crown with a statue of Our Lady of Immaculate Conception and said that she was the "true Queen of Portugal". Since then, Portuguese monarchs did not have a coronation but instead an acclamation. Before the assumption of the Portuguese throne by the Philippine Dynasty, the Kings of Portugal used to be anointed and crowned in the Jeronimos Monastery in Lisbon.

In 1755 the Great Lisbon earthquake destroyed Lisbon and the Paço da Ribeira, the Portuguese royal residence of the time. With the destruction of the palace, innumerable pieces of the Portuguese crown jewels of the time were destroyed, lost, or stolen.

While his court was in Rio de Janeiro, João VI had a new set of Portuguese crown jewels made. Constructed by the royal jewelers at the workshop of António Gomes da Silva, the set most notably included a new crown and sceptre, among a plethora of jewelry pieces. The pieces from this era are the majority of the current set of jewels.

When Maria Pia of Savoy became Queen Consort of Portugal, King Luís I ordered many pieces of jewelry to be made, as it was a passion of his wife. Alongside this, he had a new royal mantle produced.

When the Portuguese Royal Family was exiled, many of the jewels were taken with Queen Amélie of Orléans and Queen Mother Maria Pia of Savoy on their respective exiles.

In 2002 a large part of the Portuguese crown jewels were stolen from the Museon in The Hague, where they were on loan for an exhibition on European crown jewels. A total of 15 pieces had been loaned to the museum, with the six most valuable (irreplaceable) pieces having been stolen. Following an investigation by the museum and Dutch authorities, the Dutch government paid a sum of six million euros to the Portuguese government for reparation.

The Portuguese crown jewels are currently kept at the Ajuda National Palace, in Lisbon. While the palace is a popular and important museum, the crown jewels were not on view to the public until the completion of the new wing of the Ajuda National Palace Museum in 2022.

== Current crown jewels ==
Though the Portuguese crown jewels have had a long history, wars, theft, and devastation have reduced the jewels mainly to those produced under the reigns of João VI and Luís I. The current set of crown jewels includes numerous pieces of jewelry, gold, gems, robes, and other regalia, but most notably:

=== Crowns ===
==== Crown of João VI ====
The Crown of João VI is an imperial format crown. A unique feature of the crown is that it is composed only of pure gold and red velvet, without a single precious stone or gem – an oddity amongst European crowns of the time. The crown was made in 1817 for the acclamation of King João VI. It was created in the workshop of the Royal Jeweler, Dom António Gomes da Silva, in Rio de Janeiro. It is on display at the Royal Treasure Museum at the Palace of Ajuda.

=== Sceptres ===
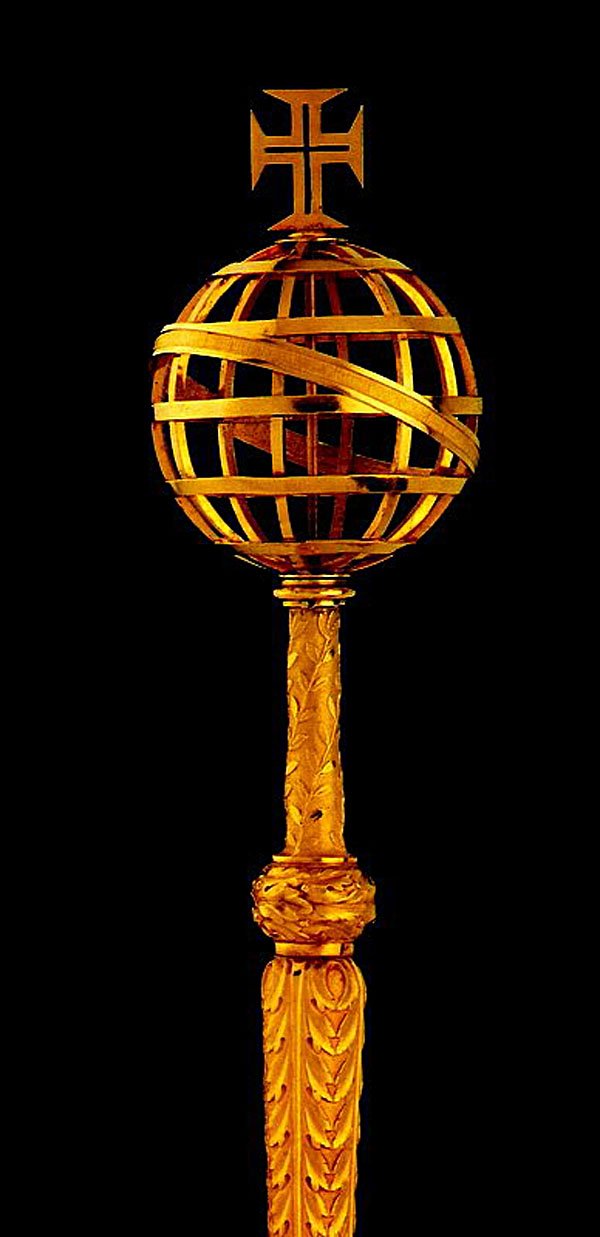
The Sceptre of the Armillary

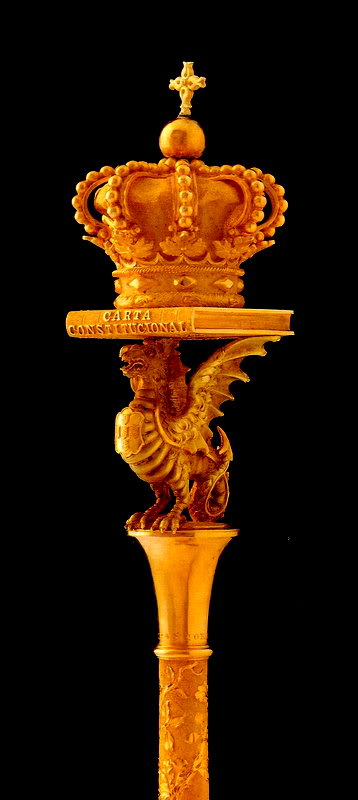
The Sceptre of the Dragon

==== Sceptre of the Armillary ====
The Sceptre of the Armillary is the sceptre that was created for the acclamation of King João VI, in the workshop of the Royal Jeweler, Dom António Gomes da Silva, in Rio de Janeiro. The sceptre bears the symbols of the United Kingdom of Portugal, Brazil and the Algarves, Portugal's designation during João VI's stay in Brazil. It is on display at the Royal Treasure Museum at the Palace of Ajuda.

==== Sceptre of the Dragon ====
The Sceptre of the Dragon is the sceptre that was created for the acclamation and use of Queen Maria II, in London, England. The sceptre bears many symbols pertaining to Portugal's new constitution, though Portugal would commence its War of the Two Brothers later the year the sceptre was created. It is on display at the Royal Treasure Museum at the Palace of Ajuda.

=== Mantles ===
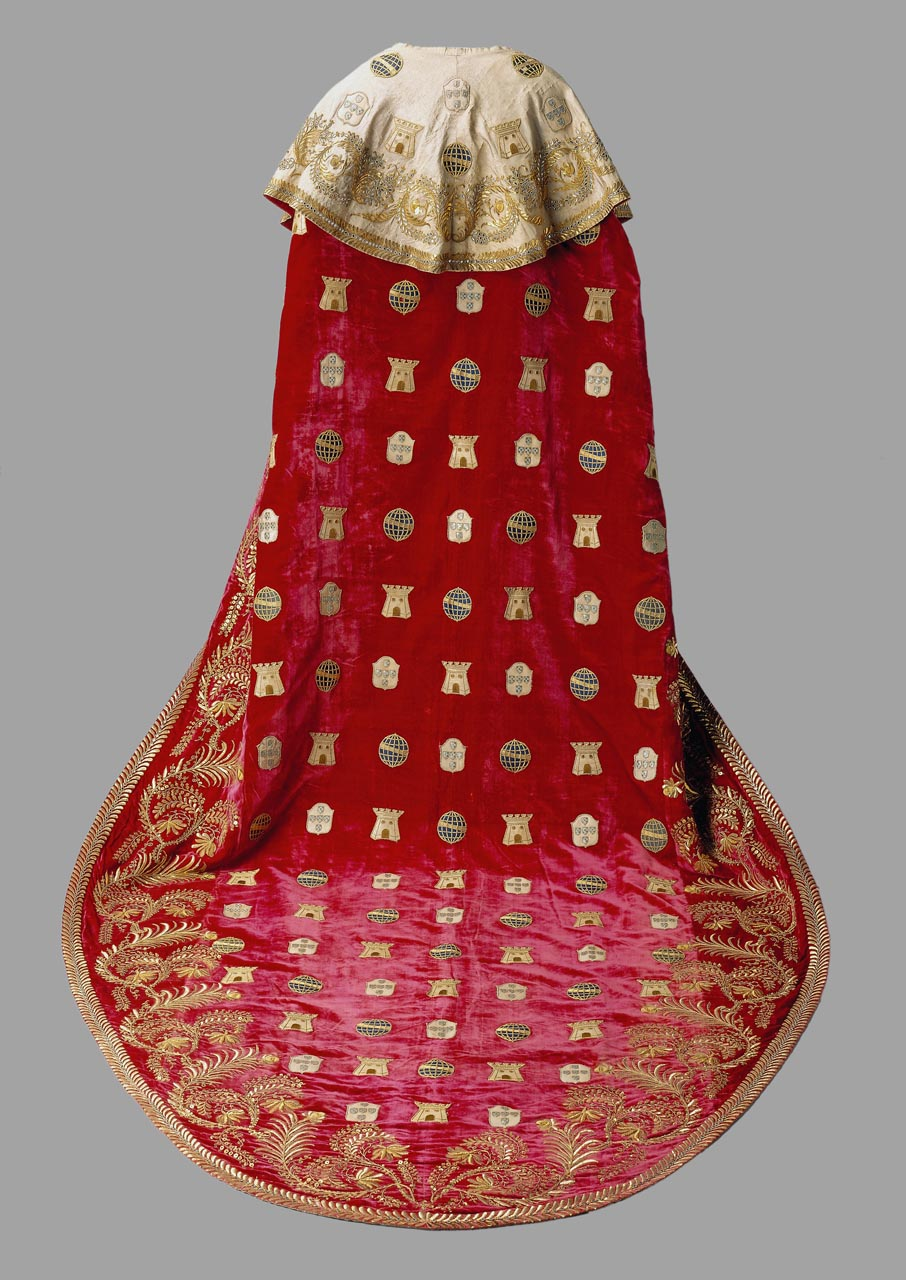
The mantle of João VI

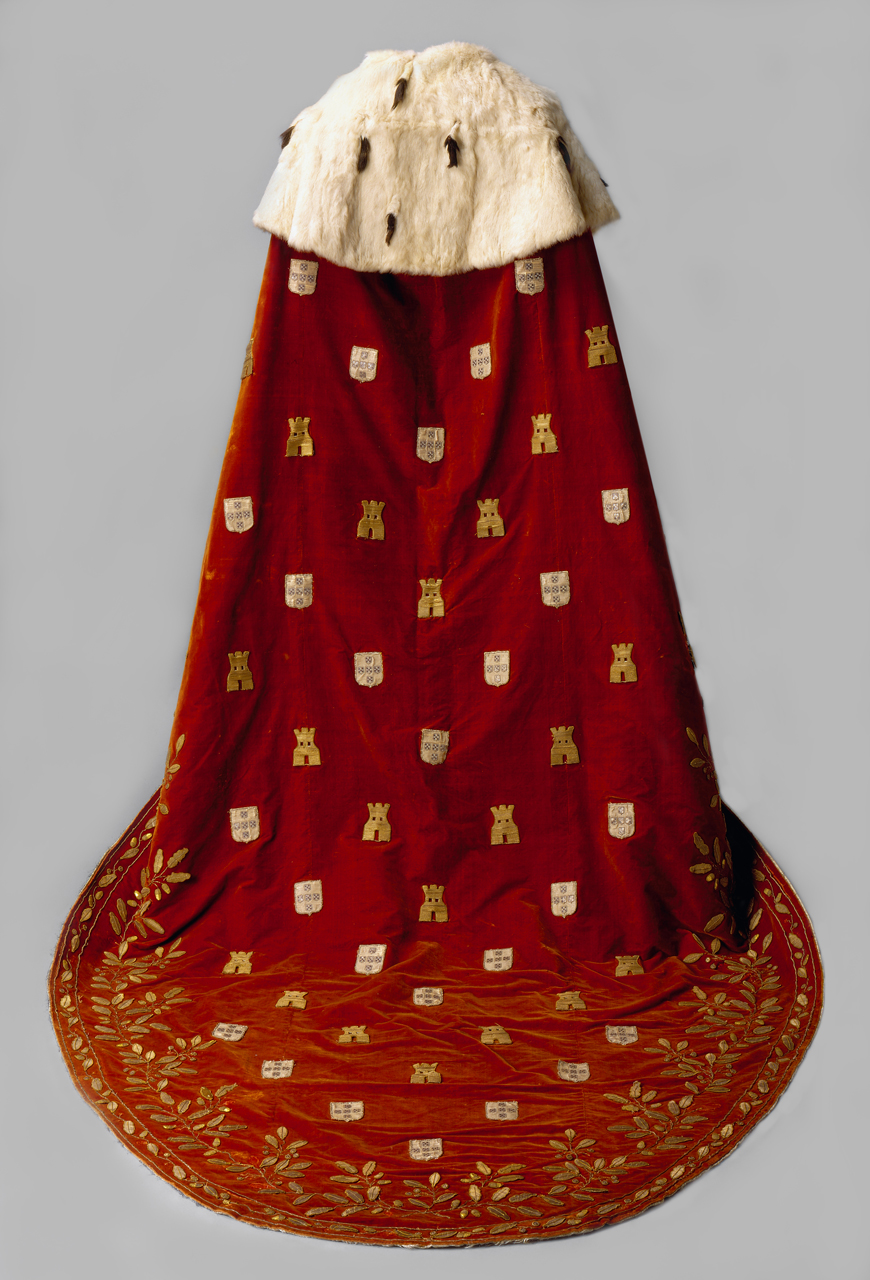
The Mantle of Luís I

==== Mantle of João VI ====
The Mantle of João VI is the royal robe that was fashioned for the acclamation of King João VI. The mantle was fashioned in Portugal, even though João VI's court was in Brazil. The royal robe bears many symbols of the Kingdom of Portugal and was only used by João VI. It is on display at the Royal Treasure Museum at the Palace of Ajuda.

==== Mantle of Luís I ====
The Mantle of Luís I is the royal robe that was fashioned for the acclamation of King Luís I. The mantle was fashioned in Portugal and bears many symbols of the Kingdom of Portugal. Though originally made for Luís I, it was used by all the monarchs of Portugal afterwards.

=== Jewels ===
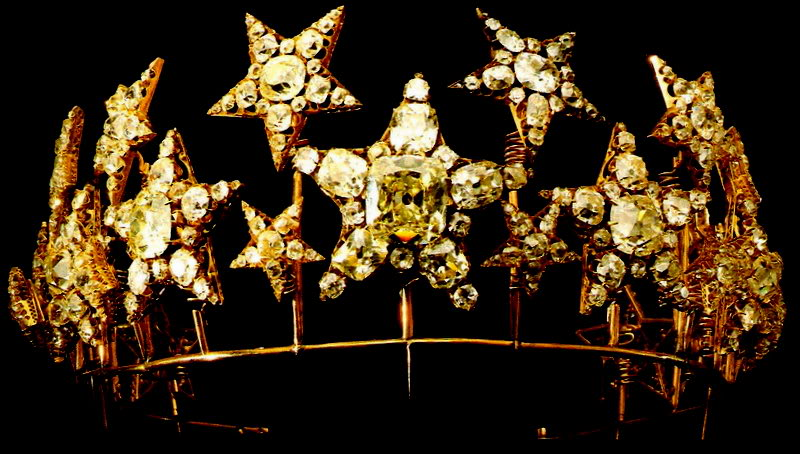
The Diadem of the Stars

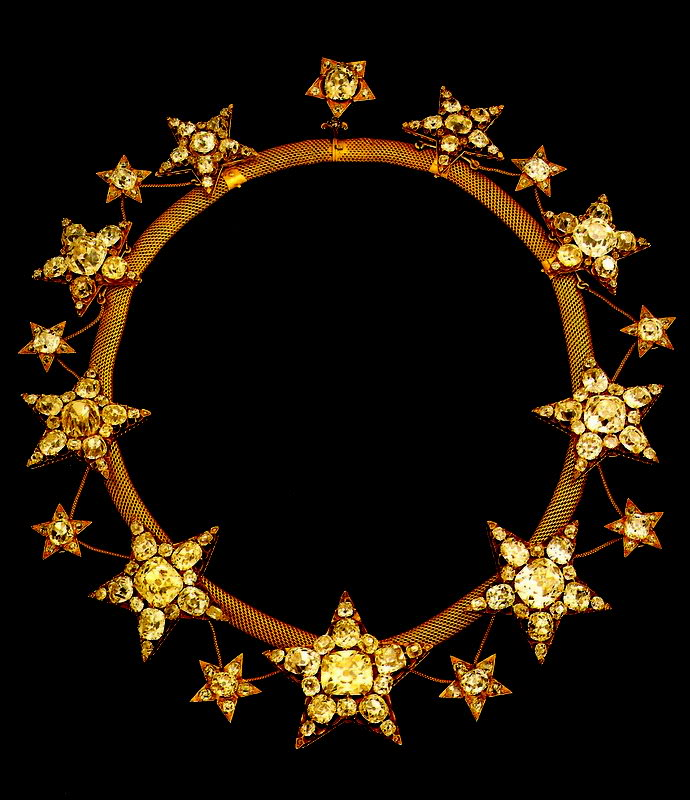
The Necklace of the Stars

==== Diadem of the Stars ====
The Diadem of the Stars is a famous Portuguese diamond tiara. It was commissioned by the Consort of King Luís I, Queen Maria Pia of Savoy. The tiara is just a piece of a whole set of jewelry, famed for its precious diamonds and sapphires, commissioned by Maria Pia, famous for her love in the arts of fashion and jewelry. It is on display at the Royal Treasure Museum at the Palace of Ajuda.

==== Necklace of the Stars ====
The Necklace of the Stars is a famous diamond necklace. It was commissioned by Queen Maria Pia of Savoy, the Consort of King Luís I. The necklace is a piece the set of jewelry commissioned by the queen, which includes the famed Diadem of the Stars, the counterpart of the necklace.

== Jewels of the House of Braganza ==
When the Portuguese First Republic was proclaimed, the Portuguese Royal family went into exile. Only having an extremely short time to pack up and go, the family brought only a fraction of the personal jewels they owned. The jewels that were left and were private possession to the family, not the official crown jewels, were given to the House of Braganza Foundation. Many years after her exile, Queen Amélie of Orléans sold some of her jewels, such as her famous ruby and diamond tiara to American socialite, Barbara Hutton. The remainder of her jewels were either left to members of her family in France, or to the House of Braganza Foundation.

The current Portuguese Royal Family has a set of jewels that can be divided into two sets. The first set are the jewels that Duarte Pio, Duke of Braganza inherited from his mother, Princess Maria Francisca of Orléans-Braganza, great-granddaughter of Emperor Pedro II of Brazil and great-great-granddaughter of King Pedro IV of Portugal. The second set are jewels that are owned by House of Braganza Foundation. These jewels, though not owned by the Duke, are at the disposal of the Duke and Duchess.

== Sources ==
- Royal Treasure Museum
- Jóias da Coroa Portuguesa (In Portuguese)
- Portugal’s crown jewels stolen in Holland
- The Portuguese Diamond
