= Crown of João VI =

Portuguese Royal Crown

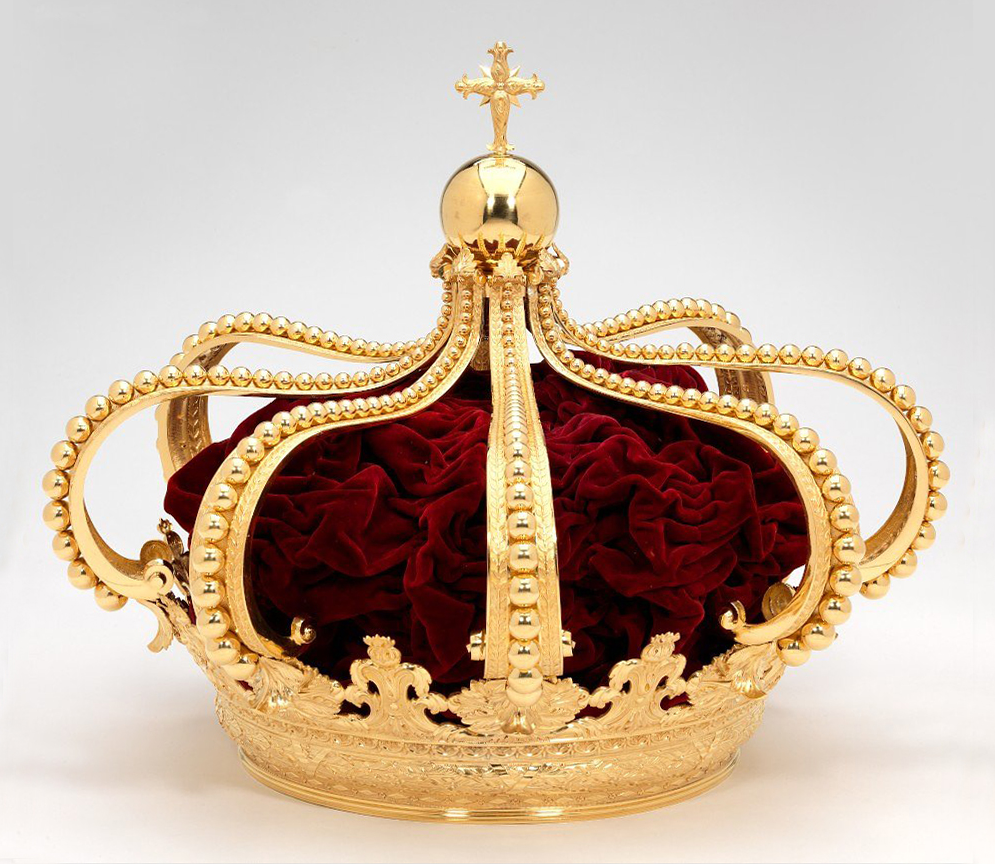
- The Crown of João VI on display at the Royal Treasure Museum at the Palace of Ajuda.

Heraldic depictions

Details
- Country: Kingdom of Portugal and the Algarves
- Made: 1817
- Owner: Government of Portugal
- Weight: 2,5 kg
- Arches: 8 half arches
- Material: Gold, silver, iron
- Cap: Purple-red velvet
- Notable stones: None

The Crown of João VI (Portuguese: Coroa de D. João VI), formerly named as the Portuguese Royal Crown (Coroa Real de Portugal), is the most recent and only extant crown of the Portuguese Crown Jewels.

== Description ==
The crown is fashioned out of gold, silver, iron, and red velvet. Its eight half arches are surmounted by a monde: a globus cruciger on a crown, with a cross at its top—as Portugal was a Catholic nation. The base of the crown is elaborately decorated with baroque patterns and designs.

== History ==
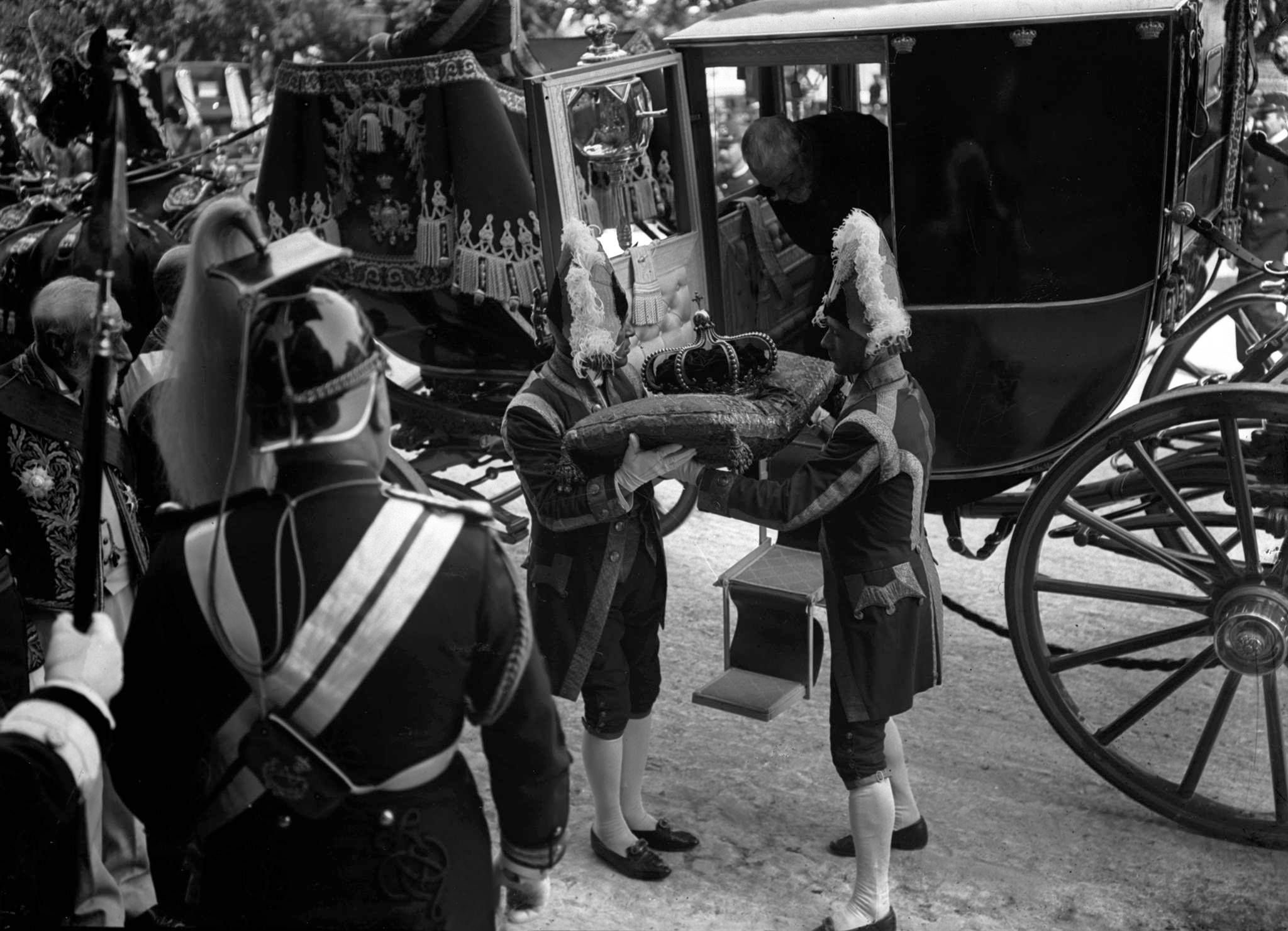
Arrival of the crown for the ceremony of acclamation of King Manuel II, 1908.

The Crown of João VI was made in 1817 for the acclamation of King João VI. The crown was fashioned in the workshop of D. Antonio Gomes da Silva, the Royal Jeweler.

The crown was made as part of the set of crown jewels, which included the Sceptre of the Armillary and the Mantle of João VI, which was specifically made for João VI's acclamation. It then became the official crown of the monarchs of Portugal and was used by all the Portuguese monarchs after João VI.

Though serving as the monarchy's official symbol, the crown was never actually worn by any Portuguese monarch. In 1646, King João IV had consecrated the Crown of Portugal to the Virgin Mary; following this, no Portuguese sovereign ever wore a diadem, though it was usually present at the ceremony where his ascension was proclaimed.

The crown saw its last official use during the reign of King Manuel II, when it was used for his acclamation and at the official opening of the Cortes, the Portuguese parliament.

The Crown of João VI, along with all the other Portuguese Crown Jewels, are kept in the Ajuda National Palace, in Lisbon.

== See also ==
- Portuguese Crown Jewels
- Mantle of João VI
- Sceptre of the Armillary
