= Joaquim Rafael =

Portuguese painter (1783–1864)

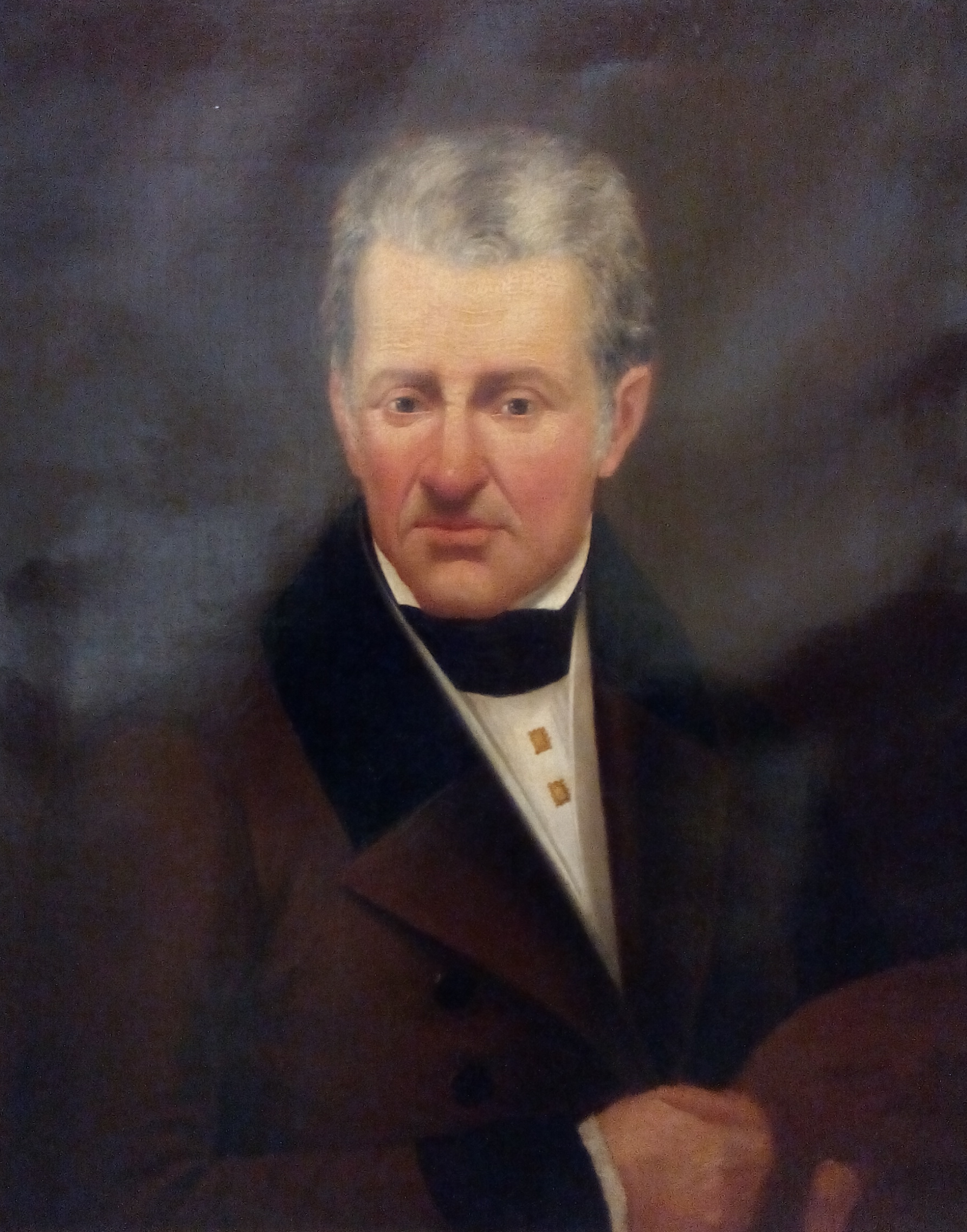
- Self-portrait by Joaquim Rafael
- Born: Joaquim Rafael Rodrigues; 3 February 1783; Porto, Kingdom of Portugal
- Died: 14 August 1864 (aged 81); Lisbon, Kingdom of Portugal
- Known for: Painting and sculpture

Joaquim Rafael Rodrigues (3 February, 1783 — 14 August, 1864) was a Portuguese painter, set designer and sculptor. He was appointed as a professor of drawing at the Academy of Fine Arts in Lisbon and became the First Painter at the Royal Court, where he also sculpted, among others, wax busts of Queen D. Maria I, King João VI and Queen Carlota Joaquina, to be found in the Palace of Ajuda in Lisbon.

== Early life and family ==
Rafael was born in Porto on 3 February 1783, the son of Bento José Rodrigues, a coachman for D. Frei João Rafael de Mendonça, the Bishop of Porto between 1771 and 1793. At the age of 11, he joined the workshop of Domingos Francisco Vieira, a painter and merchant, and father of the painter Vieira Portuense (Francisco Vieira Júnior). On 23 November 1802, he enrolled in the drawing class of the Companhia Geral da Agricultura das Vinhas do Alto Douro, for which Domingos Francisco Vieira was a substitute teacher.

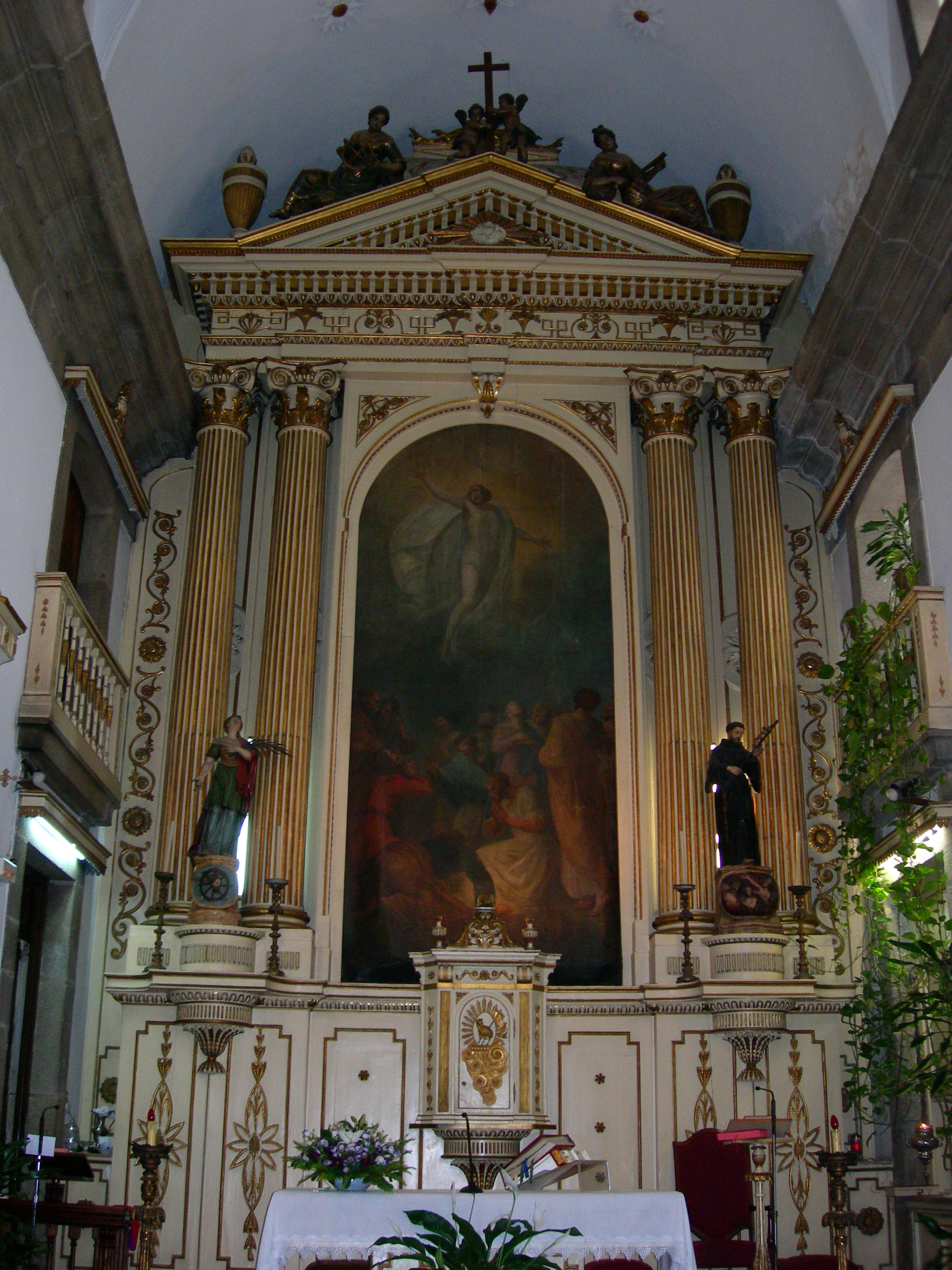
The Ascension by Joaquim Rafael

On the day he turned 22 he married Maria Francisca da Purificação, niece of Domingos Francisco Vieira. They had a son and two daughters, the birth of the second causing the death of the mother, on 13 December 1810. On 8 May 1815, Rafael married again, this time with Margarida Emília, daughter of the artist Manuel Moreira da Silva, said to be the best ornamental carver in Porto. They had nine children, three of whom also pursued careers in the arts. During his early career he would sometimes collaborate with his father-in-law and with João José Braga, a sculptor.

== Career ==
Rafael executed several paintings for the Porto City Council. Some were intended for celebrations commemorating the expulsion of the French from the city in 1808. Other panels were produced for the reception of regiments returning from the Peninsular War in 1814. Further panels were painted between 1820 and 1823 to go with the city's illuminations. He also painted the Ascension of Christ, for the Chapel of Santa Catarina in 1815. In nearby Braga he worked for the Benedictine Monastery of São Martinho de Tibães, producing portraits of the abbots. He also advised on the selection of paintings to be included in a collection of the works of José Teixeira Barreto.

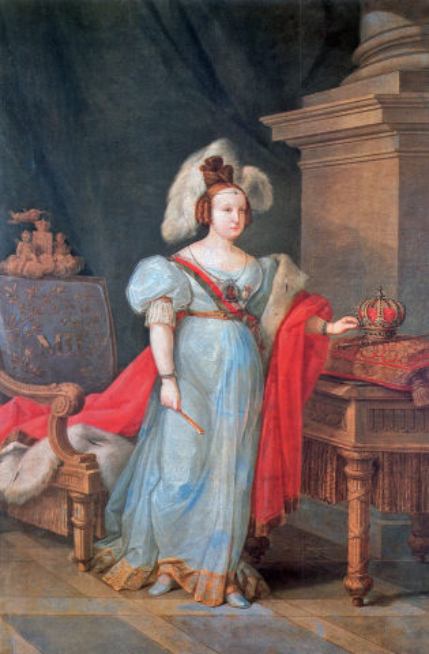
D. Maria II (1834) - Joaquim Rafael (Military Museum of Lisbon)

At the end of 1824, Rafael moved to the Portuguese capital, Lisbon. He was appointed First Painter of the Chamber and Court, on 20 June 1825, a position that had remained vacant since the death of Vieira Portuense in 1805, and master of historical drawing of the Academy of Fine Arts in 1836. Among others, he painted the portrait of Manuel Inácio Martins Pamplona Corte Real, 1st Count of Subserra and the portrait of Queen D. Maria II. He presented paintings and sketches at various exhibitions in Lisbon between 1842 and 1852, distinguishing himself in 1842 with three paintings about Saint Teresa (Transfiguration, Conception and Death). He also dedicated himself to scenography, funerary art and sculpture. Rafael was praised by the press of the time, despite sometimes being criticized for sacrificing quality for speed of execution.

Rafael was responsible for three wax busts of Queen D. Maria I, King João VI and Queen Carlota Joaquina, which are displayed in the Ajuda National Palace. These are close to caricatures, especially those of King João and Queen Carlota, although contemporary observers did note a likeness. Wax was widely used in artists' workshops to cast bronze, or to design pictorial compositions with numerous characters, but it was rarely used for formal busts of such important people. Apparently, he was requested to do this by the King, and the King's bust was the first one he finished, in 1826.

== Death ==
Rafael died in Lisbon on 14 August 1864.
