= Cirilo Volkmar Machado =

Portuguese artist and art historian

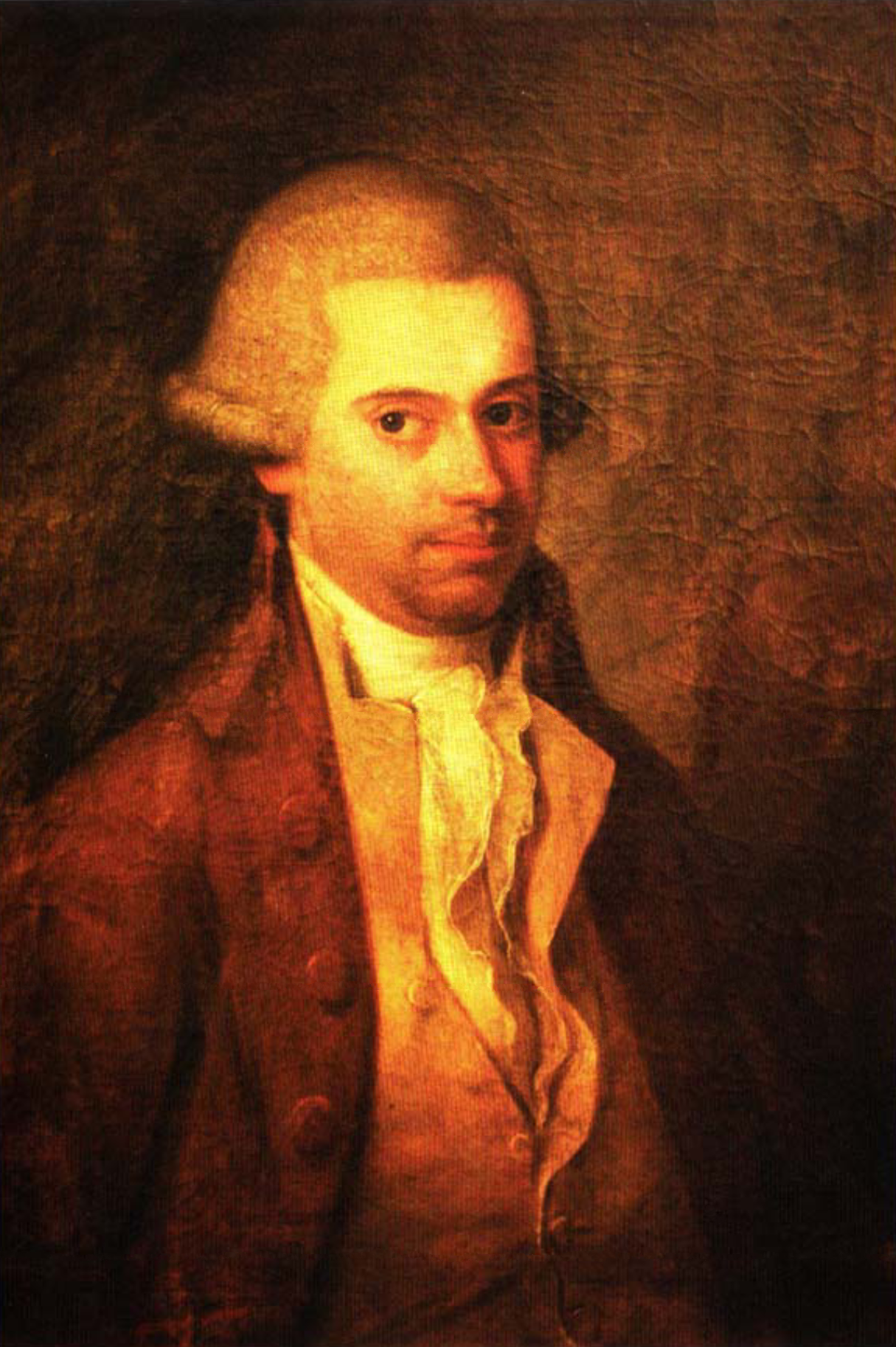
- Born: 9 July 1748; São Nicolau, Lisbon, Portugal
- Died: 12 April 1823 (aged 74)
- Education: Rome
- Known for: Painting, sculpture, architecture

Cirilo Volkmar Machado (Note: Alternatively rendered as Cyrillo Volkmar Machado, as it was usually written contemporaneously.) (9 July 1748 – 12 April 1823) was a Portuguese painter, sculptor and architect, who is considered to have been the first historian of Portuguese art.

== Life and work ==
Born on 9 July 1748, Volkmar Machado was educated in Rome. On his return to Portugal, he attempted to create the 'Nude Academy'. He painted panels and ceilings in churches, palaces, noble houses, and public buildings. He is the author of the project of the Oporto Relationship Chain and also produced some paintings in the remodelling of Palácio Nacional de Mafra, Palacio do Grilo, and Palácio Nacional da Ajuda, namely his exquisite frescos on the ceilings regularly exhibiting his tromp l'oeil technique in framings and other archtechtonic elements.

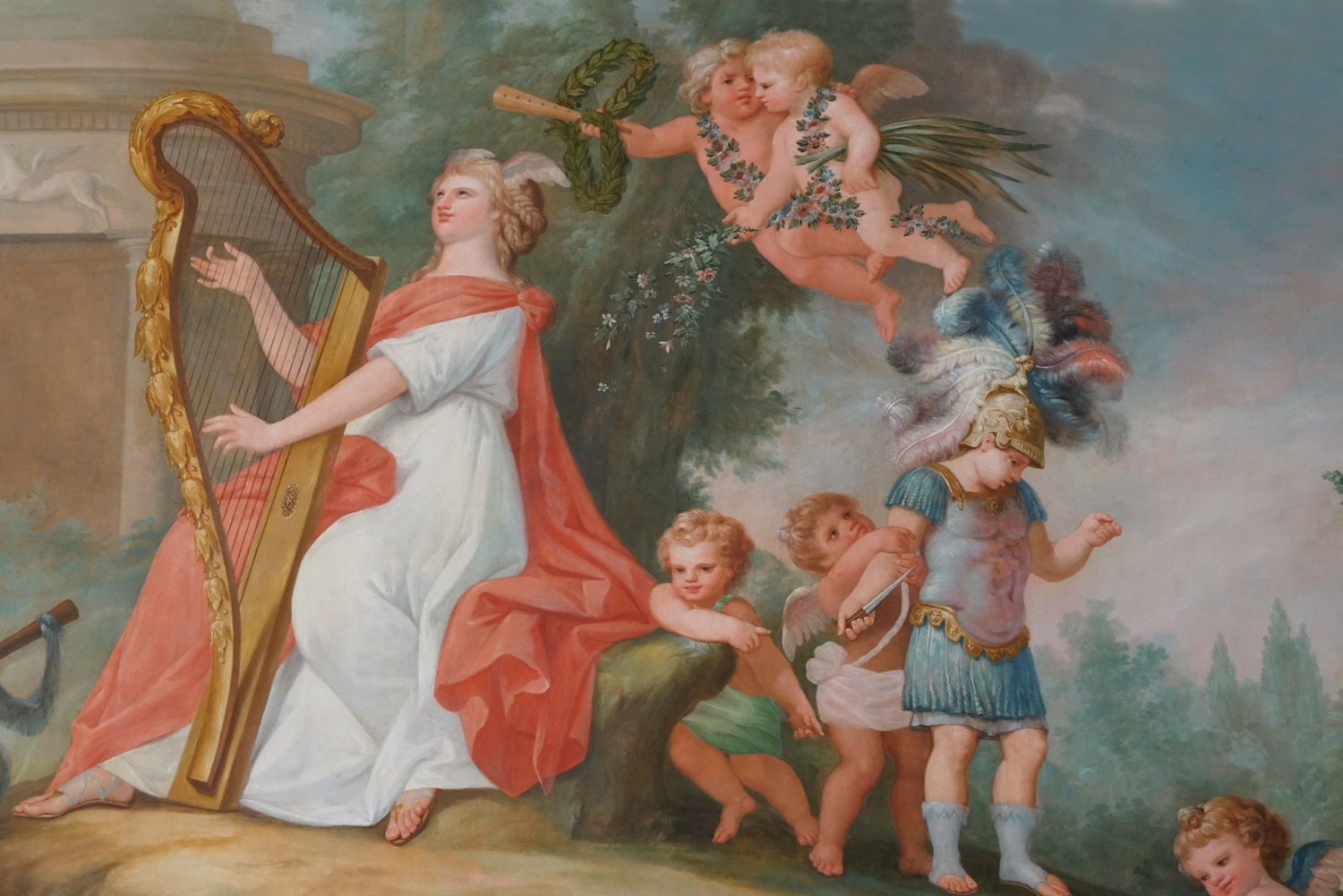
Fresco in Sala da Academia by Cirilo Volkmar Machado, Palácio do Grilo - Lisbon

He gathered an extensive collection of memories about painters, sculptors, and architects working in Portugal, which were posthumously published in his book: "Collection of Memories, concerning the Lives of Portuguese, Sculptors, Architects and Engravers, and Foreigners, Who Were in Portugal", printed in 1823 in Lisbon by Vitorino Rodrigues da Silva, which includes his autobiography from page 302 onwards.

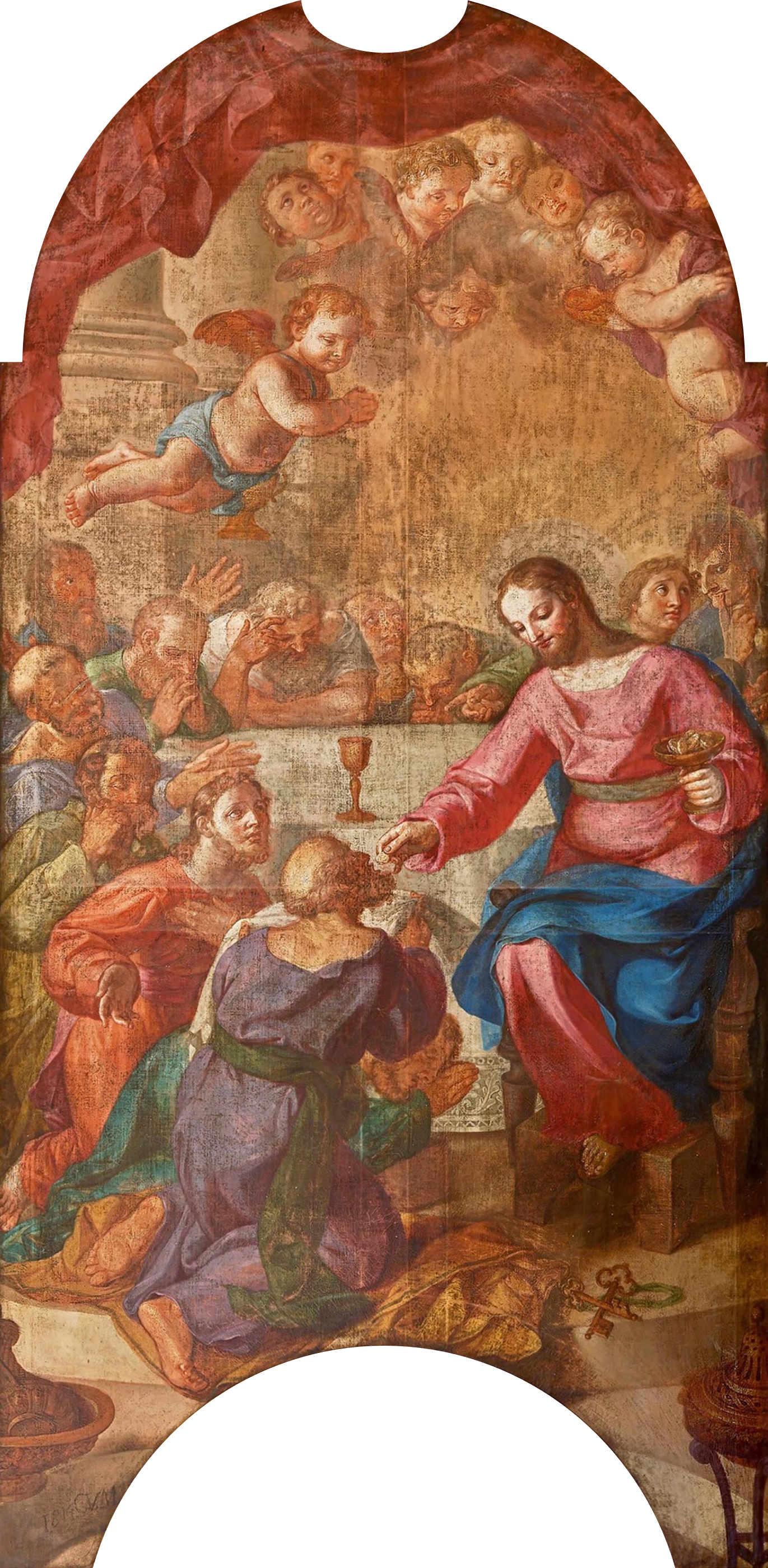
Last Supper (1814), Cirilo Volkmar Machado (Igreja de São Sebastião da Pedreira, Lisboa)

Because the book was unpublished, the editor opened the introduction with the following statement:

"We consider to be providing a great service to our Motherland, and to our National Glory, by publishing these Memoirs, which the author has collected with great work, and whose modesty, as well as natural recollective nature, have not allowed him to publish it over the course of his lifetime. No one may doubt that there are very few, and even unpublished the news of all those Artists, who have ennobled the Nation through their Works, when the Vasaris, Rafaeis Sopranes, Rossis, Leonardos da Vinci, and Palominos, occupied themselves in leaving a precious monument to posteriority, there has been among us the most ungrateful silence, not perpetuating the memory of many Portuguese artists in them engraved."

"Cyrillo Volkmar Machado" is the title of the 27th letter that Count Atanazy Raczyński, representative of the Prussian government in Portugal, wrote in his manuscript about art in Portugal.

He died on 12 April 1823, aged 74.

== Published works ==
- Collection of memories, concerning the lives of Portuguese and foreign painters, sculptors, architects and engravers. Lisboa, Impr. Victorino Rodrigues da Silva, 1823.
- Conversations on painting, sculpture, and architecture. Lisboa, Of. de Simão Thaddeo Ferreira, 1794–1798.
- New painting academy: dedicated to the Portuguese ladies who love or apply themselves to the study of Fine Arts. Lisboa, Impressão Regia, 1817.
