= José da Cunha Taborda =

Portuguese painter and architect

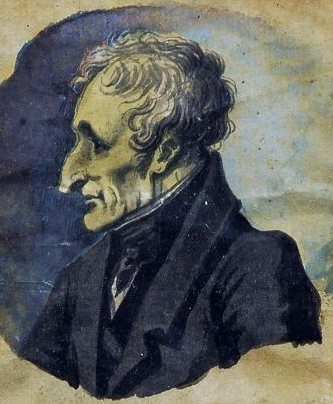
- portrait of José da Cunha Taborda, 1833
- Born: 28 April 1766
- Died: 4 June 1836 (aged 70)

José da Cunha Taborda (28 April 1766 - 4 June 1836) was a Portuguese painter and architect.

He was born at Fundão, in the diocese of Guarda, in 1766. After studying painting under Joaquim Manuel da Rocha, he went in 1788 to Rome, where he placed himself under the tuition of Antonio Cavallucci, and gained a reputation by a picture of "The Summoning of Cincinnatus to the Dictatorship." After his return to Portugal he was in 1799 appointed professor at the Lisbon Academy, and in 1803 court painter, in which capacity he painted in the royal palace of Ajuda and the hall of the Cortes.
