= Chapel of Santa Catarina =

- Azulejo tiles covering the chapel exterior
- Chapel of Santa Catarina
- 41°08′59″N 8°36′20″W
- Location: Porto
- Country: Portugal
- Denomination: Roman Catholic

Architecture
- Style: Neoclassical
- Groundbreaking: late 18th century
- Completed: 1929

The Chapel of Santa Catarina, also known as the Chapel of Souls (pt: Capela das Almas), is a chapel located on the shopping street of Rua de Santa Catarina, in the former parish of Santo Ildefonso, in the city of Porto, in Portugal. It is particularly noted for the blue azulejo tiles on its exterior walls.

== History ==
The chapel had its origins in an old wooden chapel built in praise of Saint Catherine. The construction of the present building began at the end of the 18th century, when the Brotherhood of Souls and Wounds of Saint Francis moved from the Monastery of Santa Clara to the Chapel of Santa Catarina. This led to an increase in popularity of the cult of Saint Catherine and to the decision to build a new chapel. The chapel has two sections, one lower than the other, and underwent expansion and restoration works in 1801.

== Façade ==
The main facade has a framed door topped by a circular pediment. A two-part coat of arms is fixed to the tympanum, with the arms of Saint Francis of Assisi and Saint Catherine. To the left stands the bell tower, which has two floors: the first has a door with a small window, and the second has four windows topped by a balcony. The dome is topped with an iron cross. Also noteworthy is the stained-glass window that represents souls, created in the 19th century by the painter Amândio Silva.

Until 1929, the neoclassical exterior surfaces of the chapel were plastered and painted white without tiles. The chapel's covering currently consists of 15,947 azulejo tiles that cover around 360 square metres of wall. The tiles were designed by Eduardo Leite and were made by the Fábrica de Cerâmica Viúva Lamego, in Lisbon. They represent the lives of Saint Francis of Assisi and Saint Catherine, notably his death and her martyrdom.

== Interior ==
The interior of the chapel is in neoclassical style. On the main altar is a large painting called "The Ascension of the Lord" by Joaquim Rafael.

== Gallery ==
Main façade on Rua de Santa Catarina

Souls in Purgatory, upper-left panel on the main façade

Saint Francis receiving the stigmata, lower-left panel on the main façade

Two angels kneeling beside a monstrance, upper-right panel on the main façade

Coronation of Saint Catherine, lower-right panel on the main façade

Side façade, left side

Side façade, right side

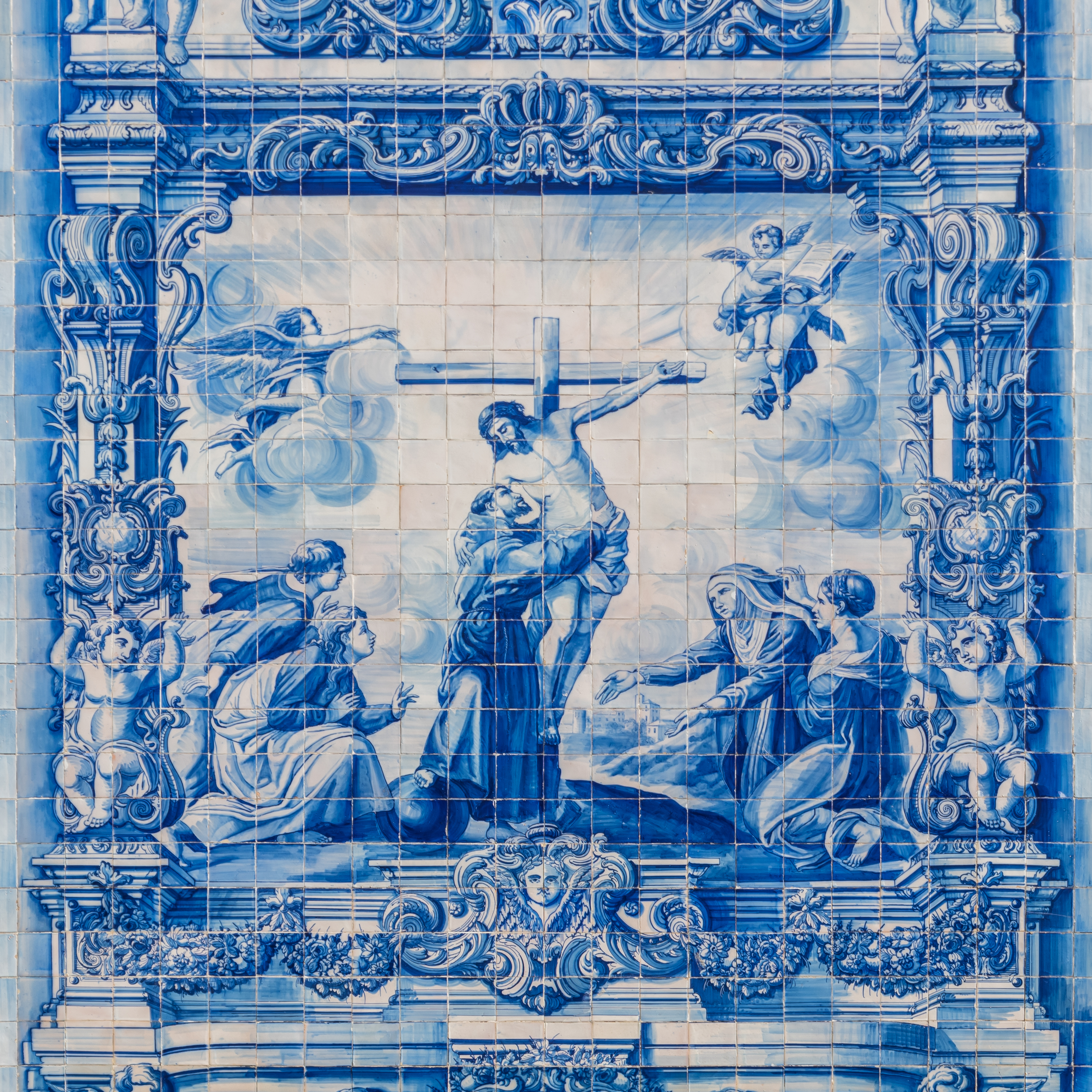
Christ embracing Saint Francis from the cross, detail of the side façade

Nave looking toward the high altar
