= José da Costa e Silva =

Portuguese architect

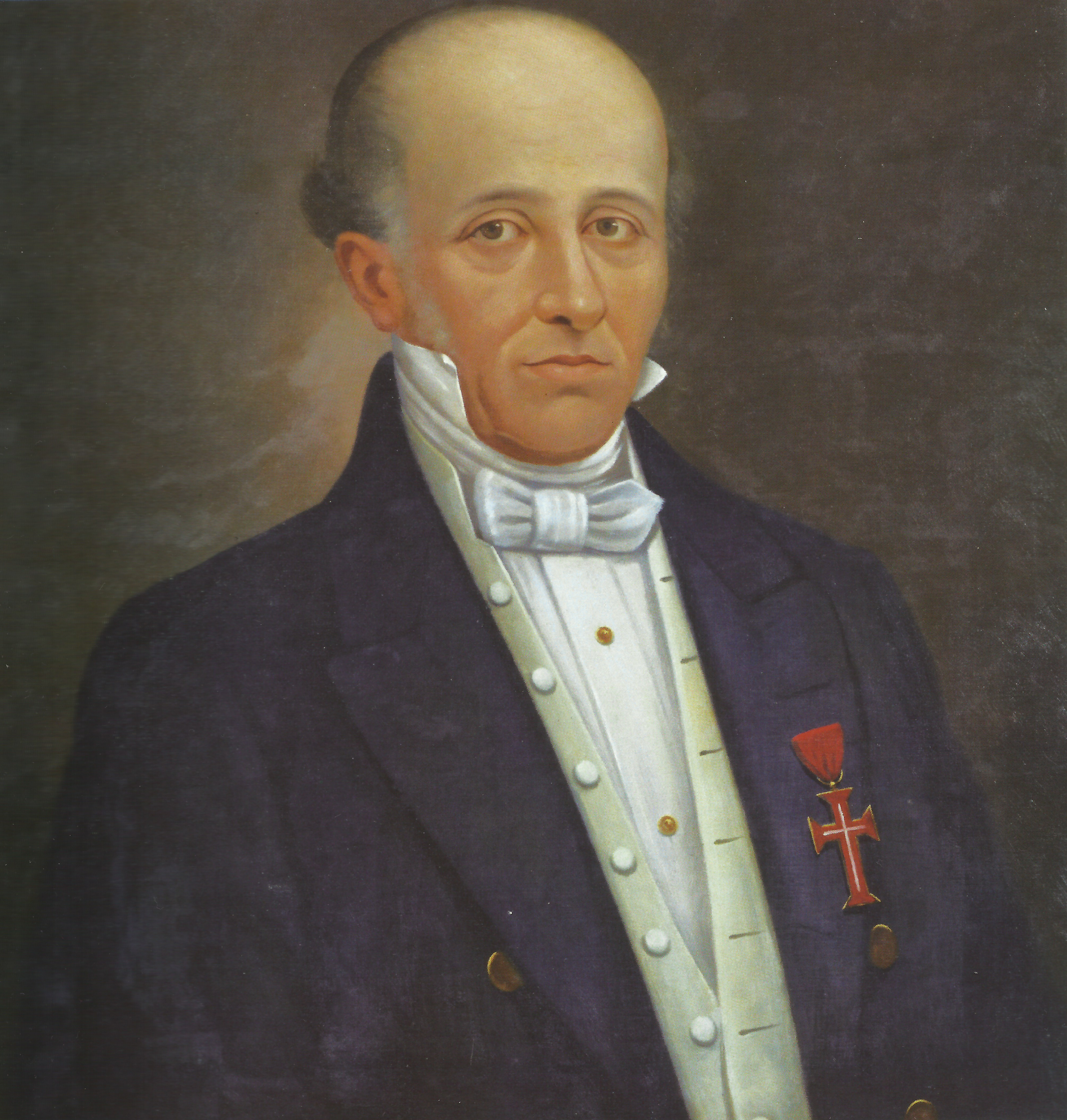
- Born: 25 July 1747; Vila Franca de Xira, Portugal
- Died: 21 March 1819 (aged 71); Rio de Janeiro, United Kingdom of Portugal, Brazil and the Algarves
- Occupation: Architect
- Projects: Royal Theatre of São Carlos (1792); Royal Theatre of São João (1813)
- Design: Neoclassical

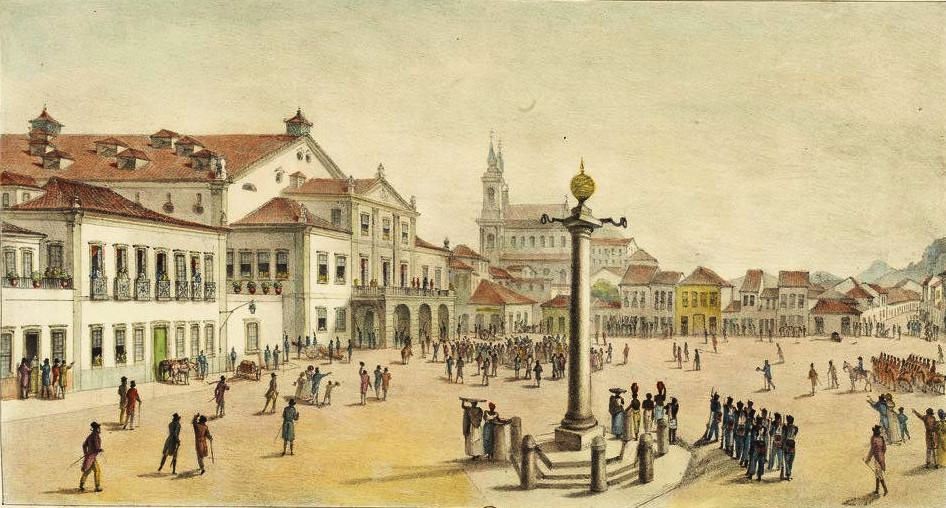
Painting of central Rio de Janeiro (1835) by Debret. The building with a Neoclassical facade and porch that occupies the left of the square is the Royal Theatre of St John, designed by Costa e Silva.

José da Costa e Silva (25 July 1747 – 21 March 1819) was a Portuguese architect. His work helped establish Neoclassical architecture in Portugal and colonial Brazil.

Costa e Silva studied architecture in Rome, where he had contact with Italian Neoclassicism. He later became Royal architect, and headed several important projects in Portugal. Among his most important works are the Royal Theatre of São Carlos (1792) in Lisbon and the Military Hospital (1792) near Torres Vedras. He is also believed to be the author of Seteais Palace (1801) in Sintra. In Lisbon, Costa e Silva and the Italian Francisco Xavier Fabri created the project for the Royal Palace of Ajuda (after 1802), which was however too grandiose and could not be completed.

In 1807, Costa e Silva went to Brazil together with John VI and the Portuguese court, which had to escape the invasion of Portugal by Napoleonic troops. In Rio de Janeiro, which became capital of the Portuguese Empire, Costa e Silva designed an opera house in Neoclassical style. This opera house, called Royal Theatre of St John and modelled after the São Carlos of Lisbon, was one of the first Neoclassical buildings in Brazilian soil. It was later destroyed in a fire.
