= Palace of Ajuda =

Monument in Portugal

Ajuda Palace
- Palácio da Ajuda
- Main façade of Ajuda Palace

General information
- Status: Royal palace, museum
- Type: Palace
- Architectural style: neoclassical architecture
- Location: Lisbon, Portugal
- Coordinates: 38°42′27.34″N 9°11′53.98″W
- Opened: 17 July 1795
- Owner: Portuguese Crown (1795-1910); Portuguese Republic (1910-present)

Technical details
- Material: Brick

Design and construction
- Architect: Giacomo Azzolini
- Known for: Royal Residence

Website
- www.pnajuda.imc-ip.pt

Portuguese National Monument
- Type: Non-movable
- Criteria: National Monument
- Designated: 16 June 1910
- Reference no.: IPA.00004722

The Palace of Ajuda (Portuguese: Palácio da Ajuda, Portuguese pronunciation: [ɐˈʒuðɐ]) is a neoclassical monument in the civil parish of Ajuda in the city of Lisbon, central Portugal. Built on the site of a temporary wooden building constructed to house the royal family after the 1755 earthquake and tsunami, it was originally begun by architect Manuel Caetano de Sousa, who planned a late Baroque-Rococo building. Later, it was entrusted to José da Costa e Silva and Francisco Xavier Fabri, who planned a magnificent building in the neoclassical style.

Over time, the project underwent several periods when the construction was stopped or slowed due to financial constraints or political conflicts. When the royal family had to flee to Brazil (in 1807), following the invasion of Portugal by French troops, the work proceeded very slowly with Fabri taking charge of the project, later followed by António Francisco Rosa. Lack of financial resources would also result in the scaling down of the project. The construction of the Ajuda Palace, which began in 1796 and lasted until the late 19th century, was a project plagued by various political, economic and artistic/architectural problems. It was invaded by Napoleon's troops in 1807, and discontinued by Liberal forces who imposed a constitutional monarchy that reduced the power of the royal family. Artistically, it was a convergence of the Baroque styles from the Palace of Mafra, very connected to regal authority, with the birth of the Neoclassic style from Italy. Further interruptions occurred, due to a lack of funds, political sanctions or disconnection between the workers and the authorities responsible for the project. The project was modified several times, but was generally authored by Manuel Caetano de Sousa (the last Baroque architect) and, later, Costa e Silva and Fabri, both of them Bolognese architects whose tastes crossed the architectural spectrum, but in which Neoclassicism predominated.

When the palace finally became a permanent residence of the royal family during the reign of Luís I and his wife, Maria Pia of Savoy, their architect, Possidónio da Silva, introduced many aesthetic changes and turned one of the lateral façades into the main one. Most of the palace interiors were designed during King Luís I's reign by his wife, Queen Maria Pia and Possidónio da Silva.

Since 2022, the palace has hosted the new Royal Treasure Museum (Museu do Tesouro Real), which showcases the Portuguese crown jewels and other royal collections.

== History ==
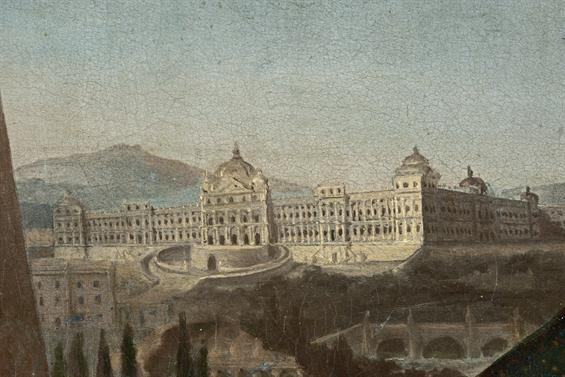
A depiction of how the palace was originally meant to look like once completed (detail of an 1802 portrait of the Prince Regent, by Domingos Sequeira).

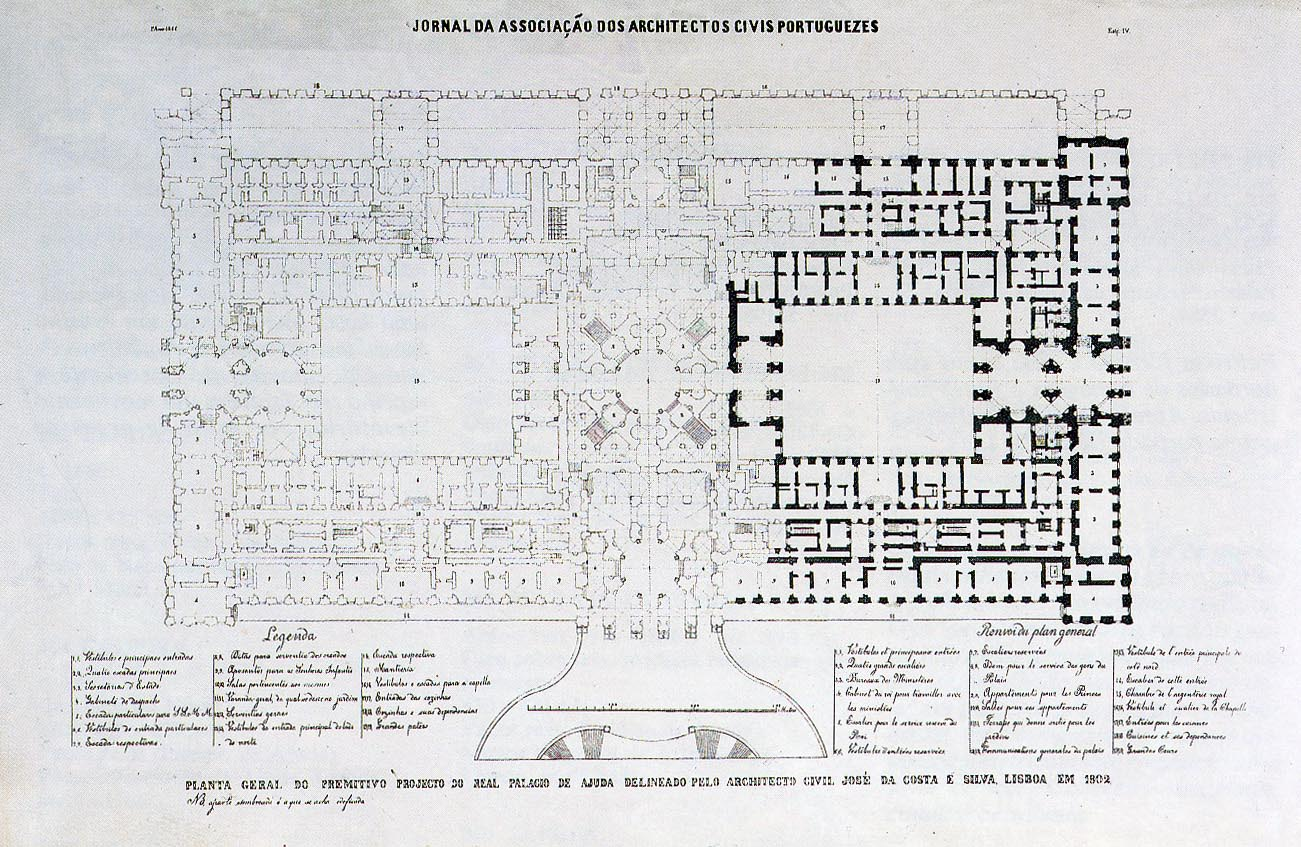
A plan of the Ajuda Palace (1866), by the Association of Portuguese Civil Architects

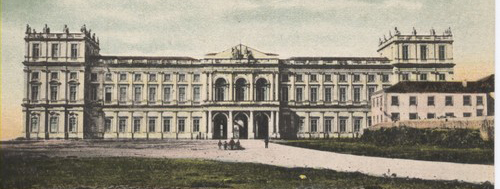
An 1870 illustration of the Ajuda Palace, during its time as residence to the royal family of King Luís

In 1726, King John V of Portugal acquired three estates in the parish of Belém: one became the Belém Palace; on the second parcel an oratory, which was eventually expanded, becoming the Necessidades Palace; and the third reserved for a summer residence that never materialized during his reign.

On 1 November 1755, the day of the 1755 Lisbon earthquake, the royal family was in Belém, and escaped the destruction of Lisbon by the earthquake and tsunami. Perturbed by the events, King Joseph refused to live under a residence of masonry, and took refuge in a wooden cabin next to the Palace of the Counts of Óbidos (packed with tapestries from the Quinta de Baixo). As the royal family continued to fear for the viability of the Ribeira Palace in Lisbon, the King ordered the construction of a more permanent wooden building in the heights of Alto da Ajuda; the architects Petrónio Mazzoni and Veríssimo Jorge began building an elaborate structure from wood collected from the Vale de Figueira pinery. The Real Barraca (Royal Tent), or Paço de Madeira (Wooden Palace) was completed on 20 September 1761 (and the first baptism was held in its chapel), but, owing to risk of collapse, the theatre (which was considered a risk by architect Giovanni Carlo Galli-Bibiena) was reconstructed from 1767 to 1786 by Giacomo Azzolini. The court remained at this site for nearly three decades, in a luxurious atmosphere of the golden age of enlightened despotism, until the King's death in 1777. Since his successor, Queen Maria I of Portugal lived with Peter III in the Palace of Queluz at the time of Joseph's death, the Royal Barraca was vacated.

In November 1794, during the reign of Maria I and the Prince Regent, the royal tent was destroyed by fire, although the fire-fighters were able to save the library and church. A more permanent dwelling was conceived by the architect José da Costa e Silva. Starting on 17 July 1795 the rubble and terrain was cleared, which continued on 27 July under the direction of António Vicente. The first cornerstone was laid on 9 November under the direction of Manuel Caetano de Sousa (with a secondary project under the supervision of German Xavier de Magalhães). It was conceived as a Baroque-late Rococo building, but the construction was interrupted shortly after. As of 19 May 1796 the project was supplied by the masons Francisco António and Joaquim Baptista, who brought in stone from Monsanto (Idanha-a-Nova), sand from Alfeite, calcium oxide cooked in Alcântara, tile from the Alhandra, with limestone provided from Pêro Pinheiro, Belas, Vila Chã and Monsanto. The intervention of many architects resulted in a royal decree (9 December 1801) that stated that alterations to the project could only be made in agreement with Manuel Caetano de Sousa, Joaquim de Oliveira, José da Costa e Silva and/or Francisco Xavier Fabri (as long as it economized on the project costs). But, Manuel Caetano de Sousa designed an overcomplicated and intricate Baroque building (which was later criticized by da Costa e Silva and Fabri in 1801). But, with mounting confusion and difficulties between the architects and contractors, on 21 January 1802, da Costa e Silva and Fabri were invited by the Crown to present a new project, in conjunction with António Francisco Rosa and Manuel Joaquim de Sousa, while excluding Manuel Caetano de Sousa.

In 1802 Manuel Caetano de Sousa died, and by 26 June, da Costa e Silva and Fabri were appointed official architects. Da Costa e Silva and Fabri respected what was already constructed, but introduced necessary alterations to change the royal palace into a more dignified, serious and majestic building. Consequently, the plan was simplified and reduced to a core structured around two courtyards, with the same level of ornamentation, but now much more refined.

On 2 July 1802, the monarch solicited the Marquis of Alorna to study the future paintings that would occupy its walls. Domingos Sequeira and Vieira Portuense were contracted to paint the property, accompanied by Joaquim Gregório da Silva Rato, Manuel Prieto, José da Cunha Taborda, Fuschini and Calisto, while Italian decorators Manuel da Costa and Giuseppe Viale were hired to decorate the mansion. Similarly, sculptors Joaquim Machado de Castro (who created three sculptures), Carlo Amatucci (some), João José de Aguiar, and his assistant Gregório Viegas (executed ten statues), Joaquim José de Barros Laborão and Manuel Joaquim Laborão (completed six statues), while Faustino José Rodrigues and his son, Francisco Assis Rodrigues, were contracted to complete three sculptures. In 1803, Carlos Amatucci completed the sculpture of Liberdade.

=== Peninsular War ===
By 1807, the painters, sculptors and decorators had been contracted, but the arrival of Jean-Andoche Junot's forces immediately stopped the build as the royal family fled to Brazil (Rio de Janeiro). Yet, Junot insisted that the building should continue. But in 1809, the French invasion of the Portuguese territory finally caused the suspension of the project. By 1812, Francisco Fabri returned to chef the project, since José da Costa e Silva had also joined the royal family in Brazil. Fabri's model was based on the Palace of Caserta in Naples, designed by Luigi Vanvitelli. He envisioned an ample palace design, directed South, towards the Tagus River, with four main towers at its angles: the works restarted in 1813.

In 1814 and 1815 work progressed in the rooms and staircases that were completed, with Taborda, Fuschini, Calisto, Cirilo Volkmar Machado (and his assistant Oliveira Góis), and Máximo Paulino dos Reis as painters, while decorator Manuel Piolti took over the interior layout. In 1814, Cyrillo painted the Sala do Dossel. In April 1815, the quarry of Lameiras was appointed to extract rock for the columns of the main floor.

Manuel Caetano da Silva Gaião joined the project in 1815 to assist the team. In 1817, Francisco Fabri died, and was replaced by his assistant, António Francisco Rosa, who was forced by the Royal Treasury to curb the scope of the project. Several individual projects were completed in 1818: Domingos Sequeira returned to direct the painting of the palace; the model for the south tower, authored by José Joaquim de Sousa was completed; on 26 September the vaulted ceiling was erected in the vestibule; and on 12 November, the decorative works in the Sala dos Embaixadores (Ambassador's Hall) were cleaned by contractors Severiano Henrique Pereira and Francisco de Paula.

King John VI, still in Brazil, began to show interest in the project, and presented the designs to his local architects Auguste-Henri-Victor Grandjean de Montigny and João da Silva Moniz. When António Francisco Rosa took over the work in 1818, the project progressed at a slightly accelerated pace, on the assumption that the royal family would return. But, the Cortes were insecure about the expenses in completed Ajuda.

On 11 January 1819, ten new flourishments in the Ambassador's Hall were executed by António Joaquim de Faria and the contractors Francisco de Paula, Severiano Henrique Pereira and Leandro Gomes. On 15 February, in the Sala dos Archeiros (Archer's Hall), the painters Vicente Paulo Rocha and João de Deus Moreira, painted the base boards, following the designs of Manuel Piolti (since José Francisco Ferreira quit the project). By May, Volkmar Machado proposed a new eastern façade, with a triangular apex and allegorical sculptures, alluding to the expulsion of the French during the Peninsular War, but the project was dropped. Between 1819 and 1920, sculptures of Justice and Prudence were completed by de Aguiar; the ceilings of the Archer's Hall and Cane Concierge's Hall by Taborda (1766–1836) were completed, its doors first started by Piolti (1770–1823); the metal shields on the doors were provided by the Army arsenal; the ceiling of the Hall of Spanish Tapestries by Volkmar Machado, with perspectives by Piolti, figures by Joaquim Gregório da Silva Rato and ornamentation by André Monteiro da Cruz; skirting by bronzer and gilder Pierre-Philippe Thomire (1751–1843); the ceiling of the antechamber of the Sala do Despacho (Order Room) was completed by da Cruz and Taborda. In 1820, a new project for the south and eastern façades was authorized, which included a system of ramps and staircases created by Rosa. Metalsmiths João Pereira and Manuel António, and carpenter José Joaquim de Sousa completed the project.

On 27 July 1820, a meeting was held by the royal palace inspector, da Costa e Silva, Volkmar Machado, de Magalhães, Rosa and da Silva Gayão to decide upon the first design for the eastern façade, or a new composition by Volkmar Machado. During these meetings the project for the vestibule was approved; the decoration of the Sala da Tocha (Torch Room), its access ramps and staircase; and the painting designs for the rooms by Piolti, which were executed by Anacleto José Narciso, Eugénio Joaquim Álvares, Eusébio de Oliveira, João de Deus, José António Narciso, José Tomás and Vicente Paulo.

By 1821, when John VI of Portugal returned from Brazil, the palace had not yet been completed, and only permitted some state and ceremonial protocols (such as John's investiture in the Order of the Garter in 1823). Consequently, John VI decided to live in the Bemposta Palace. With a new simplification of the plans, architect António Francisco Rosa continued the structural works. During this phase, painters Taborda, Sebastião José Alves, José Joaquim de Sousa, Bernardino de Sena Lemos da Rocha, Arcangelo Fuschini, Máximo Paulino dos Reis, Joaquim Gregório da Silva Rato, Piolti, João Pereira, José Pedro de Carvalho, and mason António Joaquim de Faria worked at the palace. In 1823, the staircase was decorated by painter Norberto José Ribeiro, and in 1825 Joaquim Rafael became head painter.

The palace began to be used as a royal residence in 1826, when the Infanta Isabel Maria, Regent on behalf of the young Queen Maria II, moved in. It was proposed to the architects that the project's scale be reduced, encompassing only one-third of the original design, making the eastern façade the main entrance and erecting a tower at the southern end. Its plan now reduced in half, it included one block, the construction of which was immediately interrupted by the Liberal victory in 1833.

In 1827, Piolti died, leaving behind the decorative painter António Inácio Vieira in charge of the interior design. Work on site began, and quickly ended in 1828, by the English mason John Johnston. He was responsible for theEnglish staircase, but was mysteriously removed from the project to be replaced by Nicolau Pires. In 1830, António Joaquim de Faria, responsible for many of the stonework within the palace, also died. Similarly, three years later, Sebastião José Alves died, being succeeded by Joaquim José Ventura Alves.

During the second half of the 19th century, new works in the palace were specifically done to adapt the existing space to a permanent royal family residence: the windows in the antechamber of the Sala do Despacho were completed by Paul Sormani; new lace draperies from Switzerland were hung in the windows; the Quarto de D. Luís (D. Luís Room) was partitioned, with a lowered ceiling, and used as an office space with washroom; the Sala de Trabalho do Rei (King's Study) was decorated with a new rug, produced by the English firm Thomas Bontor & Company, which also produced new rugs for the Sala Chinesa (Chinese Hall); also, the older Sala de Bilhar (Billiard Room) was divided into two rooms: the Sala Chinesa (Chinese Room) and the Sala Império (Imperial Hall).

=== Liberal Wars ===
These changes were primarily due to the increase use of the palace. In 1828 Miguel of Portugal was acclaimed by the Portuguese Cortes in the Cortes Hall (today the Dining Room). Miguel also inhabited the palace for six months as the royal residence, the Necessidades Palace, underwent remodelling.

The move of the Royal Court to Queluz Palace in 1829, and the death of the architect Rosa, resulted in a slowing of the project, and the affected the north wing which fell into ruin.

With the start of Liberal and Absolutist factionalism, the country entered into a period of fragile stability, and the project, already moving slowly, stopped in 1833 with the entry of liberal forces in Lisbon.

With the restored Liberal regime, Peter IV took over as Regent until his daughter's age of majority, swearing allegiance to the Constitutional Charter in the throne room on 30 August 1834. Peter attempted to complete the palace, under the revised plan of Joaquim Possidónio Narciso da Silva, but was unsuccessful. Yet, some projects continued inside the building: in 1836, the antechamber of the Sala do Despacho with scenes of Diana by André Monteiro da Cruz was completed; in 1837, several paintings were repaired by Joaquim Rafael; in 1844, busts of the monarchs in wax were ordered, by Joaquim Rafael; and the sculpture of Inocência by Benedetto Delisi was executed in 1860.

=== Royal residence ===
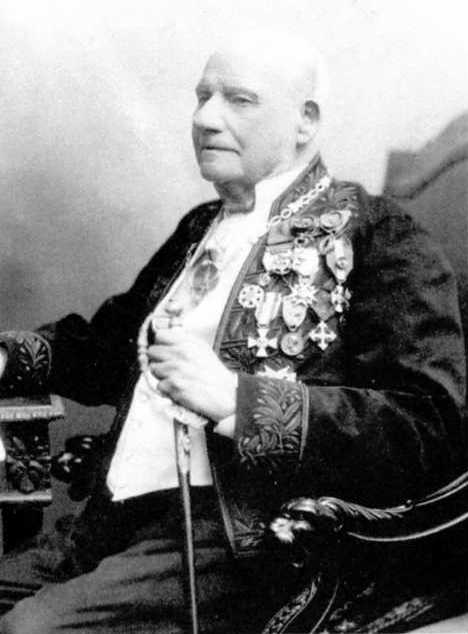
Joaquim Possidónio Narciso da Silva, one of the many architects that were involved in the construction, remodelling and renovations at the Ajuda Palace over time

Following the tragic deaths of members of the royal family in 1861 from typhoid fever, there were many who counselled King Luís to abandon the Palace of Necessidades. After being acclaimed king (22 December 1861), Luís moved temporarily with to the Palace of Paço de Arcos, while remodelling occurred at Ajuda to adapt the building to become the new royal residence. At the same time, a match was made between Luís and Maria Pia of Savoy, daughter of King Victor Emmanuel II of Italy, who were married in 1861; on 16 April 1862, the new King and his wife, moved into the palace transforming it into the formal royal residence.

In order to become liveable, the King directed Possidónio da Silva and Costa Sequeira to renovate and remodel the building, primarily based on the tastes of the Queen. The old Sala do Dossel, the audience hall, was renamed the Sala das Tapeçarias Espanholas, because of the Spanish three crystal chandeliers were installed in the hall on the occasion of the marriage of Luís and Maria Pia of Savoy. An interior vestibule was transformed into a Winter Garden(Portuguese: Jardim de Inverno). Possidónio da Silva also covered the ceiling murals with a painted ceiling covered in genies, sphinx and chimeras, on which were later applied agate and chalcedony stones (gifts from the Viceroy of Egypt) in addition to Portuguese marble. The Sala do Fumo (Smoking Room) was constructed in carved wood. The Sala Azul (Blue Room) was decorated tapestries found in the space (which were produced by the Real Fábrica de Santa Bárbara de Madrid with designs by Francisco de Goya). These tapestries were a gift from Spain in 1785, in honour of the royal wedding of the Prince John VI and Carlota Joaquina. Similarly, the as a reception room, and the workers tore up gold wallpaper and replaced the painted cornice with a real one. In the office adjacent to the Winter Garden, the walls were lined in pink velvet to house a collection from Saxony and the ceiling stucco was painted with representations of birds and views of Italy and Lisbon, by Giuseppe Cinatti and Achille Rambois, while the furniture was selected by Krieger, Suc. Racault of Paris. The Sala Verde (Green Room) received new ceiling stucco with bas-relief ornamentation and gold-leaf. Renovations also proceeded in the palace chapel, Queen's washroom and dining room by Leandro Braga, who was also assisted by Atelier responsible for the King's painting studio and personal library. It was during this remodelling that the painting Chegada de D. João VI, in the ballroom by the artist Fuschini disappeared.

State cradle of Prince Carlos, preserved at the palace.

In the meantime, on 28 September 1863, the Infante Carlos (later King Carlos of Portugal) was born in the Sala Verde (Green Room).

Other additions to the palace followed in subsequent years: in 1863, a bust of Maria Pia was executed by Santo Varni; an inlaid table was completed by Focentino Eugenio Azgnani (a wedding gift to Maria Pia, from the city of Faenza); in 1865, the execution of the sculpture by Odoardo Fantacchiotti (1809–1877); Maria Pia solicited Possidónio da Silva to substitute the painting in the ceiling of the Sala de Música (Music Room), the allegorical scene painted by José da Cunha Taborda and Arcangelo Fuschini, was substituted by one commissioned by Felisberto António Botelho; the Sala Azul (Blue Room) was lined in silk; in 1866, a marble statue, Tangedoura do Pandeirowas completed by Giovanni Dupré (1817–1882); in 1867, the parquet floor in the Sala do Despacho and Sala dos Contadores was completed by Godefroy, a joiner in the Belgian Royal House; the execution of the sculpture Mulher com bilha à cabeça by Célestin Anatole Calmels; the execution of a bust of King Luís I, also by Anatole Calmels; in 1869, the execution of the sculpture Leda by Cesare Sighinolfi; a painting of the King was also completed by the painter António Rodrigues da Silva; in 1870, Maria Pia mascarada by Joseph Layraud; in 1873, work on the parquet floor in the Sala Azul (Blue Room) by Joseph Godefroy; in 1874, paintings of the Princes Carlos and Afonso in the Sala Rosa (Pink Room) were completed by Joseph Layraud.

By the end of the 19th century, new exterior restorations had begun, under the direction of Domingos Parente da Silva, while new additions continued within the interior: in 1875, a sculpture of Maria Pia was completed by Cesare Sighinolfi; in 1876, a painting in miniature of Luís and Maria Pia by Michele Gordigiani; in 1879, a new parquet floor in the Sala do Archeiros (Archer's Hall) and the Sala do Porteiro da Cana by Mardel Magalhães was begun; a painting of a canvas representing Umberto I of Italy by A. Jangiovanni was also installed in the same year; in 1881, the sculpture O Saltimbanco by Simões de Almeida was executed; in 1886, the a sculpture of Victor Emmanuel II, by Joaquim Santos; in 1887, paintings over the doors of the Queen's vanity by Ernesto Condeixa; in 1890, the portrait of Infante Carlos for the ante-chamber of the Sala do Despacho was completed by José Malhoa; in 1891, a new marble floor for the Sala dos Embaixadores (Ambassador's Hall) commission by António Moreira Rato & sons was installed;

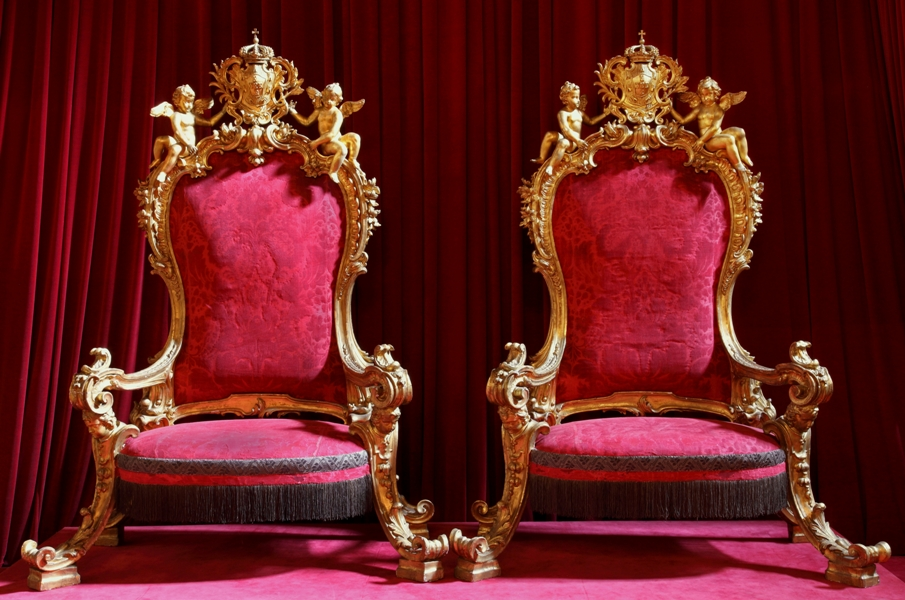
Thrones of King Luís I and Queen Maria Pia

After the death of her husband, Queen Maria Pia continued to live in the palace with her son, the Infante Afonso. Although King Carlos of Portugal began to reside in the Palace of Necessidades, the palace (although residence of the Queen Mother) was reserved for official ceremonies, including banquets and receptions, such as those in honour of Edward VII of the United Kingdom of Great Britain and Ireland, Alfonso XIII of Spain, Wilhelm II, German Emperor and President Emile Loubet of France. Carlos made few changes to the palace, although he was responsible for ordering two large pots in Berlin from the Parisian factory of the Duke d'Angoulême, for the Sala do Trono (Throne Room). Similarly, on the occasion of the King Edward VII's visit, he also ordered new chairs for Sala da Ceia (Dining Room). Manuel II remained in residence at the Palace of Necessidades following the death of the King and Crown Prince in the Lisbon Regicide, during the tumultuous years before the revolution.

=== Republic ===
With the 5 October 1910 Revolution all work on the palace ceased and was closed, beginning a new phase of neglect that would later result in the flooding of the library by rainwater in 1925.

In 1934, Duarte Pacheco commissioned Raul Lino to develop a plan to complete the building, which was deferred owing to the costs associated with the project. But the Republican government did inventory many of the furniture and artwork, and along with many of artefacts from other palaces, stored them in the Ajuda Palace. In 1938 the palace was opened as a museum, and in 1954 the Casa Forte (Vault) was opened in order to exhibit the Portuguese Crown Jewels and silverware of the Royal Household.

Another attempt to renovate the palace was proposed in 1944, in a new project by Raul Lino, but never materialized, and in 1956, Arantes e Oliveira commissioned Raul Lino, once again to elaborate a new project. The Serviços dos Monumentos Nacionais (National Monument Services) branch examined the building to determine its condition (in 1956), which also predicted a large investment to completely restore the palace. After a period of restricted access (between 1940 and 1968), when only people who had an authorization card from the Direcção Geral da Fazenda Pública (General Directorate of the Treasury), the palace was opened to the public on 20 August 1968.

A new green-space was created to enhance the front (eastern) façade of the building in 1961, but in 1974 a fire destroyed a significant part of the north wing. Between 23 and 24 September the fire consumed King Luís' painting gallery and part of the north wing, which included 500 paintings, including a self-portrait by Rembrandt. It was partially transformed into a museum in 1968, and served as the headquarters of the Ministry of Culture (Portuguese: Ministério da Cultura), IPPAR and IPM.

In 1989, the president of the IPPC, invited civil engineer Garcia Lamas and architect Gonçalo Byrne to elaborate a project to finish the palace. The designers created two maquettes and various plans, which envisioned the completion of the uncompleted wings and the extension of the gardens to the Jardim das Damas (Lady's Garden). The plan would also include the construction of two residential zones nearby that would cover 75% of the work.

On 26 May 1992 the palace was assigned to the Portuguese Institute of Architectural Heritage, under Decree-Law 120/92. The palace's bibliothèque is the namesake for the Cancioneiro da Ajuda.

== Architecture ==
The Ajuda National Palace is located on a hilltop of the central part of the parish of Ajuda overlooking the historic centre of Lisbon and Tagus River, south of the Monsanto Forest Park. Its main access way is in the Largo da Ajuda on the eastern side of the property, but it is also transited by the Calçada do Mirante à Ajuda (north) and Rua dos Marcos (west). Although the palace occupies a block on the heights of Ajuda, its delineated space extends to several gardens and lands around the main building. This includes: the Jardim das Damas (Lady's Garden) fronting the northern façade of the Palace; the Sala da Física (Physics Hall), in the north-eastern corner fronting the palace; the clock-tower, also known as the Torre do Galo (Rooster's Tower), isolated in front of the palace; and the larger Jardim Botânico (Botanical Garden), southwest and across the street from the palace.

=== Exterior ===
Statue of Carlos I in front of the palace

Palace courtyard

Vaulted entrance vestibule

Modern western façade housing the Royal Treasure Museum

One of the earliest neoclassical buildings in Lisbon, the palace is an irregular rectangular building, divided into four wings (with the western wing being incomplete) around a large quadrangle, paved with Portuguese calçada in geometric designs. Each wing is occupied by distinct entities: the eastern and southern wings are occupied by museum exhibitions of the Palace of Ajuda; the northern wing belongs to the installations of the Instituto de Museus e Conservação (Institute of Museums and Conservation), the Instituto de Gestão do Património Arquitectónico e Arqueológico (Institute for Architectural Management and Archaeological Heritage), part of the Secretaria-Geral do Ministério da Cultura (General Secretariat of the Ministry of Culture), the Ajuda Library and a gallery for temporary exhibits.

The building evolved to a two-three storey structure, on an inclined plot of land, with a façade of ashlar limestone. The main symmetrical façade is oriented towards the east, with a central body and tympanum, extending to two lateral towers. This façade is two floors high, the inferior level marked by three arches, surmounted by (and separated by) Tuscan-Ionian columns supporting the secondary floor/veranda. On the second floor of the main body, the space is protected by balusters protecting the three Roman arch-windows, surmounted by a frieze of garlands, and divided by six Tuscan-Ionic columns.

Between the central body and towers are eight panels consisting of two-floors and a mezzanine, each panel divided by two orders of columns: on the first floor Tuscan and on the second floor Tuscan-Ionic columns. The first floor windows are moulded and trimmed sills with cornices, while a similar number of windows on the upper floor have veranda-like railings, surmounted by smaller square windows. The three-storey towers are also divided by Tuscan and Tuscan-Ionic columns: the first floor, have three windows and sills with angular cornices on the outside and rounded cornices on the interior; the intermediary floor has a comparable number of windows, while the third floor windows are surmounted by smaller windows (much like on the panels). The southern lateral façade has three storeys, with 19 windows in succession, comparable to the main entrance, although there are a series of niches at the base. The uncompleted western façade show signs of vestiges of various dependencies with a wall of open window sills/arches with Tuscan pillars and access to the central courtyard by three rounded arches. Embedded in the vast foyer with a vaulted edge supported by Tuscan columns, has twenty-two marble statues, some signed and dated.

The vestibule is the main access to the palace, the Library and Exhibition Gallery, which by is made through the vestibule, through a monumental staircase and rounded arches. The ample courtyard is paved in Portuguese calçada, and is surrounded by two four-storey tall wings (north and south): the main floor, with central arch and doorway is flanked by rectangular windows surmounted by smaller square windows; and the superior floors, are composed of veranda-windows with simple frames and cornices and balusters/guardrails.

=== Interior ===
The interior is laid out with interconnecting halls, with a central corridor of staircases and elevators.

Sala dos Archeiros (Archer's Hall)

On the main floor entrance hall, with a succession of the museum in lateral directions, there is a staircase beside two niches with the figures of Justiça and Prudência, which access the Sala dos Archeiros (Archers Hall) completed by Joaquim Machado de Castro and his disciples. On this floor, in a linear path, the visitor follows through the following chambers and halls:

==== First floor ====
- Sala dos Archeiros (Archer's Hall), named because it was occupied by the guard of honour (from 8:00 a.m. until 11:00 p.m.), is a hall illuminated by two windows and three rectangular doors, all with golden metal shields and covered in decorative paintings representing military victories. The vaulted hall ceiling is painted by José da Cunha Taborda with the Portuguese Royal coat of arms, the windows and doors surmounted by paintings, and the floor, while paved in parquet, is covered partially in carpet. It is currently used as the principal entrance for visits to the Palace and concierge.
- Sala do Porteiro da Cana (Cane Concierge Hall) was used to announce visitors, and consists of a false cupola to squares, formed by plain columns and Corinthian capitals that support triangular pediments. At the centre is an allegory of Justiça, with two medallions flanking it, representing John VI and Carlota Joaquina, over parquet floors.
- Sala das Tapeçarias Espanholas (Spanish Tapestry Hall), as its name implies is the location of eight Spanish tapestries of various sizes, representing Dança (Dance), Passeio na Andaluzia (Walking in Andaluzia), Jogo de Cartas (Card Game), Fonte (Fountain), Merenda (Lunch), Partida para a caça (Departure for the Hunt), Regresso da Caça (Return from the Hunt) and Caçadores (Huntsmen). It was also referred to as the Sala do Dossel (Canopy Room) or Sala de Audiência(Audience Hall), since it was used by King Luís and Queen Maria Pia to as a waiting room for formal guests. On the semi-vaulted ceiling there is an allegorical mural representing King John IV's departure for Brazil. In addition to various paintings and architectural elements, there are wooden cornices and a parquet floor, while over four doors there allegorical paintings interspersed by the eight large tapestries. The hall is occupied by a large desk with many gold-leaf wooden chairs covered in red velvet, with polished crests and chiselled bronze elements.
- Antecâmara da Sala do Despacho (Antechamber of the Hall of Order), also referred to as the Sala do Retrato de D. Carlos (Hall of Dom Carlos' Painting) or Sala de D. Sebastião (Dom Sebastian's Hall), which is a small room, with a ceiling painted with the figure of Diana and scenes from the hunt, while over the doors representations of Mercury, Vulcan, Science and Peace.
- Sala do Despacho (Hall of Order), another room with flattened vaulted ceiling, this space was used for state functions, and the King resolved official duties, typically on Thursdays. Its ceiling is painted with Aurora trazendo a Felicidade Pública, Abundância, Mentira and Justiça (by Volkmar Machado and Taborda), while the mouldings feature military motifs. On side of the room is an Italian black marble fireplace/stove, comprising two ionic columns, supporting a frieze ornamented by flowers and cornice, with fire-guard in metal. The parquet floor is formed into a geometric pattern and the space decorated with several gold-velvet chairs, large vases, lowboy furniture and red-velvet topped table.
- Sala dos Contadores (Accountants Hall), also known as the Sala das Cómodas (Lowboy/Chest of Drawers Room), a small passage with inlaid parquet.
- Sala de Música (Music Room), which has a rectangular ceiling painting in tones of sepia, white and gold, with eight medallions representing the arms of Portugal, the House of Braganza and crosses of the military orders, with the walls covered in pink silk and the floor in parquet. On one end is an enormous oak wood fireplace/stove, with several glass display cabinets with ornate friezes and cornices aligned on either side. The chimney and stove are adorned by golden phytomorphic elements and arms of Portugal and surrounded on several walls by paintings and . In the centre are musical instruments (although the King Luís was a baritone, he also accompanied with his cello, while the Queen was a pianist), which are surrounded by velvet-lined bunk seating and several paintings.
- Quarto do Rei D. Luís (King Luís's Room), covered in wood paneled wainscoting, painted white and gold remains as one of the few rooms in the Palace painted in its original un-restored wall colors. The painted ceiling, depicting an allegorical representation of Paz by Cirilo Volkmar Machado that includes figures, mythical figures and flowers in each corner, while the main ceiling is designed as a fanciful open-air Cupola. The walls are painted simply in white with gold trim, divided in square panels, while the floor is paved in parquet. An ornate bed, table and white-velvet chairs decorate the room, with a writer's desk along one wall, while statues stand in the window niches on the opposite wall from the bed. Paintings of many of the Portuguese monarchs are located on one of the walls, while over the desk the full-size painting of King Carlos of Portugal is hung.
- Antecâmara do Quarto Real (Antechamber of the Royal Bedroom), continues the wainscoting and painted friezes that adorn the main bedroom, and topped by coiled phytomorphic elements, that are repeated higher on the walls.

The avant-garde Blue Room with visual effects that implied a greater grandeur

- Sala Azul (Blue Room), which is not actually blue, is covered in white and gold silk walls and drapery, with matching chairs and cushioned sofa over a parquet floor. Between 1863 and 1865, it was remodelled by Possidónio da Silva in order to provide a Royal sitting room in the tastes of Queen Maria Pia. Avant-garde for its time it included visual effects that proportioned the space, including two grand mirrors on opposite walls (one over the fireplace and the other between two windows) and a Romanesque arch opening that extends the gaze of the Blue Room into the neighbouring Gabinete de Carvalho annex.
- Gabinete de Carvalho (Oak Cabinet), an annex that served as a smoking-room, during a period when the men and women socialized independently. The space trimmed in oak, red-velvet drapery and chairs is decorated with paintings of King Luís's favourite ships, as well as oak chest of drawers.
- Jardim de Inverno (Winter Garden) or Sala de Mármore (Marble Hall), is covered in marble and agate gifted to the royal family by the Portuguese Viceroy to Egypt, with a Carrara marble fountain, with tank and pinnacle structure. The fountain is surrounded by three bronze cranes, busts, two huge ornate bird cages, vases and cushioned chairs, typical of the outdoors. Potted and hanging plants also circle the room, which gives the impression of an enclosed outdoor environment.
- Sala Cor-de-Rosa (Pink Room), a small room in pink silk, the room was specifically created to display the Queen's porcelain collection, with many figurines on display on sills on the walls, with the furniture painted in pink or cover in pink velvet.

The interior of the Green Room, used by the Queen for official duties

- Sala Verde (Green Room), clad in green silk, with a white painted ceiling with golden elements, decorative paintings (including a large 1876 portrait of the royal family by Joseph Fortuné-Séraphin Layraud), green drapery and a parquet floors with geometric elements. A large fireplace/stove in white marble occupies one wall in rounded Rococo-style decoration, protected by the fire-guard in gold metal. This was a private room, used by the Queen to conduct official duties or receive visitors, but as well was the room where she gave birth to the royal heir Prince Carlos. A small antechamber to the left (known as the Red Room, Portuguese: Sala Encarnada) was used throughout its history for various purposes (washroom, oratory, workroom or writing room), and today displays various portraits, busts, chest of drawers and writing table.
- Sala de Saxe (Saxe Room), was lined with silk, the plaster ceiling is decorated with flowers, birds and butterflies; today its austere space is used to exhibit some toys and objects associated with the Infantes Carlos and Afonso. Located to the right of the Green Room, at one time there were Portuguese medallions and paintings of Italian landscapes.

Quarto da Rainha (Queen's Bedroom)

- Quarto da Rainha (Queen's Bedroom), was decorated in the Napoleonic style of 1861, which was popular in Europe at the time, and includes walls in blue silk with a silver pattern, surmounted by a ceiling painted with allegorical depictions of Fé, Esperança and Caridade, as well as a figure of John the Baptist. The room is decorated in religious iconography, ornate wood furniture and highlighted by a large canopy bed (also in blue, gold and silver colors), while the floor is covered in carpet, with a polar bear hide. Alongside is thetoucador (changing room and toilette), and also continues the original carpeted space from the Queen's bedroom, with large three-pane standing mirror, fireplace, chest of drawers and commode. It is decorated in rich brown and gold trim, phytomorphic elements and paintings of the figures of Diana, Juno, Venus and Minerva over the doorways. The actual bathroom, more practical than decorative, nonetheless, is decorated with painted mouldings and rich wood trim, and includes a bathtub, double lavatory, double sink and bidet, hygienic innovations that came from England around 1880.
- A Casa de Jantar da Rainha (Queen's Dining Room), a private dining room was never planned in the 1802 design of the Palace, but by 1880 there was a need for a communal space. The final room was decorated in red silk and rich wood grain trim from floor to ceiling, with a wood fireplace/stove on one wall (surmounted by a large mirror), while the opposite wall provides an entrance to adjacent Billiard Room. The floor is cover in inlaid parquet floor with a bronze lustre.
- Sala de Bilhar (Billiard Room), which replaced an older room on the second floor, and occupied King Luís after dinner, as the Queen and guests would retire to the Blue Room, although the Queen was known to play with the King on occasion or with her piano teacher, Mrs. Cart. The room is an elaborate extension of the adjacent Dining Room, with a parquet floor, a wood fireplace, lateral wooden pilasters and dark wood grain-coloured walls, with a series of long bunk sofas against the walls. The large wood fireplace is composed of carved wood with cherubs and built-in mirror, while the central pool table occupies the majority of the space.
Music Room

Marble Room, also known as the Winter Garden

==== Second floor ====
Grand Stairs.

Interior view of the grand staircase

During State functions or celebrations, invited guests would enter via the vestibule and ascend the main staircase to the second floor of the Palace by way of the Escadaria Nobre. The enclosed staircase, is decorated with flourish carvings on the ceiling from the lower floor, which zigzags to the upper landing decorated with rounded stained glass with the royal coat of arms and painted ceiling. On the second floor of the palace lies:

- the Atelier de Pintura do Rei (King's Painting Workshop), which is preceded by a gallery with many of King Carlos' works of art. The room is lined with carvings in white, with a paneled ceiling, supported by equally spaced cornice and corbels, with windows framed by arches and canopies of false parapets, as well as a wooden staircase guarded by four foils leaked, the floor is parquet motif geometric.
- Biblioteca (Library), is a space covered in oak wood serving as library, including panels, doors, trim and the fireplace (flanked by two Atlantean warriors).
- Sala de Trabalho do Rei (King's Office), its walls painted are painted beige, with wainscoting and trim adorned with geometric elements and foliage, respectively, and focused on a panel representing Saturn. A parquet wood floor with various shades of embossed wood cover the floor, while a bronze crystal chandelier hangs from the ceiling.
- Sala das Incias L.M. (Initials L & M Room), a relatively small rectangular space, with a plane ceiling, it is adorned with an allegorical scene, depicting the initials L and M for the monarchs King Luís and Queen Maria Pia, with a wide crown moulding, decorated with stars and military motifs on a very prominent cornice and meandering ornate frieze. The walls are covered with draperies of comparable fabric, while the floor is covered in parquet.
- Sala Chinesa (Chinese Room) totally decorated in natural silk, forming a tent-shaped ceiling, with chandeliers and small metal lamps, Chinese porcelain, and red doorways with gold trim, in Oriental motifs, completed by José Procópio Ribeira in 1865. From this place visitors to the monarchs residence, for galas or ceremonial events, were stratified into various rooms, depending on class structure, until the reaching the throne room.
- Sala Império (Imperial Salon), with a wainscoting painted in pink, and walls covered in silk, the ceiling has ornate motifs, and meandering frieze, while the floor is covered in inlaid parquet.
- Sala do Retrato da Rainha (Queen's Portrait Room), a fairly wide room, with a ceiling painting feature the depiction of Vingança and Justiça Divina framed by phytomorphic elements, with walls lined with red silk and a parquet flooring. The room is dominated by the full-length portrait of the 33-year-old Maria Pia in blue and white ball gown, opposite a portrait of Infante Afonso, Duke of Porto.
- Sala dos Gobelins (Gobelins Room), the ceiling in this space is painted blue, with phytomorphic elements and festive elements in white.
- Sala do Corpo Diplomático (Diplomatic Corp's Room), was used for visiting ambassadors and members of the diplomatic corp, who waited in this room before being presented in the throne room. This room is full of classical motifs, presenting a ceiling with animals, figures and chariots, based on a Greek frieze, with painted walls and inlaid parquet floor. Three of the walls have tapestries with royal coats of arms and the last with a fireplace surmounted by mirror, with chairs assembled for the gathered visitors, all accented in red velvet and gold, and two large ornamental vases. Alongside is a small antechamber used so that visitors could wait as their name was presented to the monarchs, before appearing in the throne room. On the walls of this room are portraits of John VI of Portugal and Carlota Joaquina on opposite walls.
- Sala do Trono (Throne Room), is a large space that occupies the southern tower of the Palace, with a ceiling of the Virtude Heróica, exalting the royalty of Miguel of Portugal, with a bronze crystal chandelier, walls draped in red silk and floor covered in parquet and Aubusson carpet. On a small two-step platform are the two thrones of Luís and Maria Pia under a red draped canopy. The passageways, covered in drapery are surmounted by ancillary windows that permit light to cascade into the space. Red velvet chairs and bunks are strategically located around the open space.
- Sala de Baile (Ballroom) or Sala de D. João VI (King John VI's Hall), was used as the formal ballroom, and features an upper gallery (for the musicians) opposite the entrance, while two full-length portraits of Luís and Maria Pia flank the entrance. The walls are covered in red silk, with the ceiling divided into seven panels, the central showing the allegorical Concílio dos Deuses, from which hang three crystal chandeliers. Along one wall is a large landscape depicting the return of John VI from Brazil, opposite windows and two mirrors.
- Sala da Ceia (Supper Room), the grand dining hall for state dinners and ceremonial events (such as the acclamation of Miguel as King and the wedding of Carlos and Amelia of Orleans), the room is a long hall that includes two long tables for visitors and the main table (which intersects the other two) for the royal family. The ceiling is painted with an allegorical depiction as a tribute to John VI, depicting a sun chariot with Apollo, encircled by the Horae, months, seasons, and other allegorical figures, illuminated by three large bronze crystal chandeliers, and an upper gallery for musicians, who would play for visiting guests and diplomats. The opposite wing was altered by the adaption by actual activities in the space, and includes a staircase in the vestibule to connect the upper spaces and rooms.
Throne Room

Grand Waiting Room

State Dining Room

John VI Hall

== Royal Treasure Museum ==
Interior façade of the Royal Treasure Museum

The western wing of the Palace of Ajuda remained incomplete for over 226 years due to various political conflicts and financial crises. In 2018, a project was launched to complete the wing using a contemporary architectural design to contrast with the original neoclassical structure. The €26.5 million construction was jointly funded by the Lisbon City Council, the Lisbon Tourism Association, and the Ministry of Culture, which utilized insurance funds from the 2002 theft of Portuguese crown jewels in The Hague.

Marking the definitive completion of the palace, the Royal Treasure Museum (Museu do Tesouro Real) officially opened to the public on June 1, 2022. The museum's core is designed as a massive, three-story vault measuring 40 meters long and 10 meters high. It features state-of-the-art security, including a 5-ton steel door and bulletproof glass display cases.

The museum houses a collection of over 1,000 priceless objects from the House of Braganza, adorned with more than 22,000 precious stones. The permanent exhibition is divided into 11 thematic zones. Highlights include raw gold and diamonds from colonial Brazil, royal insignia, honorary orders, diplomatic gifts, and the Baixela Germain, a rare 18th-century complete silver tableware set crafted by French silversmith François-Thomas Germain.

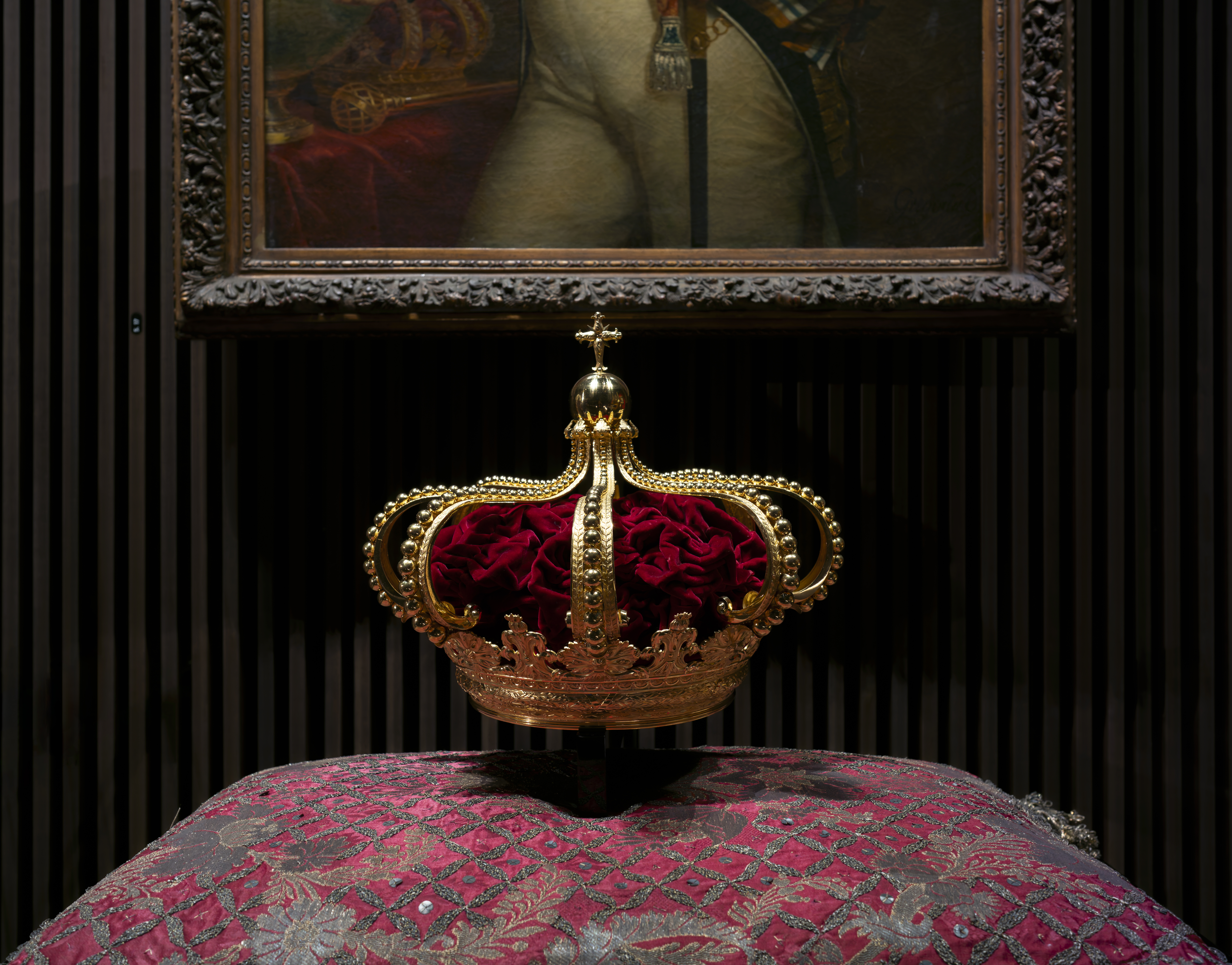
The Portuguese Crown Jewels are on display at the museum

Royal silver collections and diplomatic gifts

Silver ceremonial ewer

Silver lamp from the Royal Chapel

Gilded silver basin and salver

The 18th-century Baixela Germain table service

The Baixela Germain silver table service

Silver tureen and stand from the Baixela Germain

Natural gold nugget from colonial Brazil

== Gallery ==
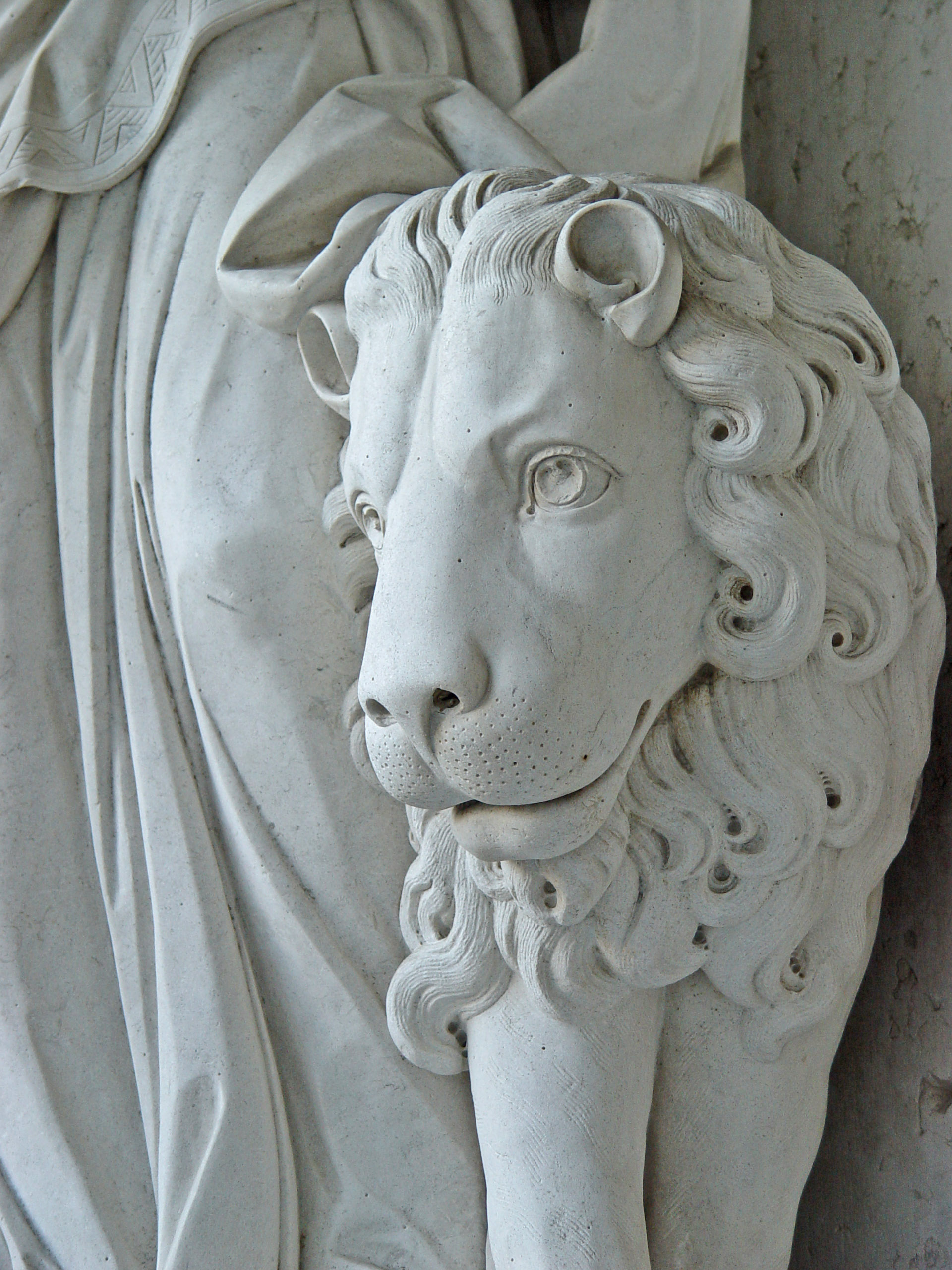
A detail of a sculpture

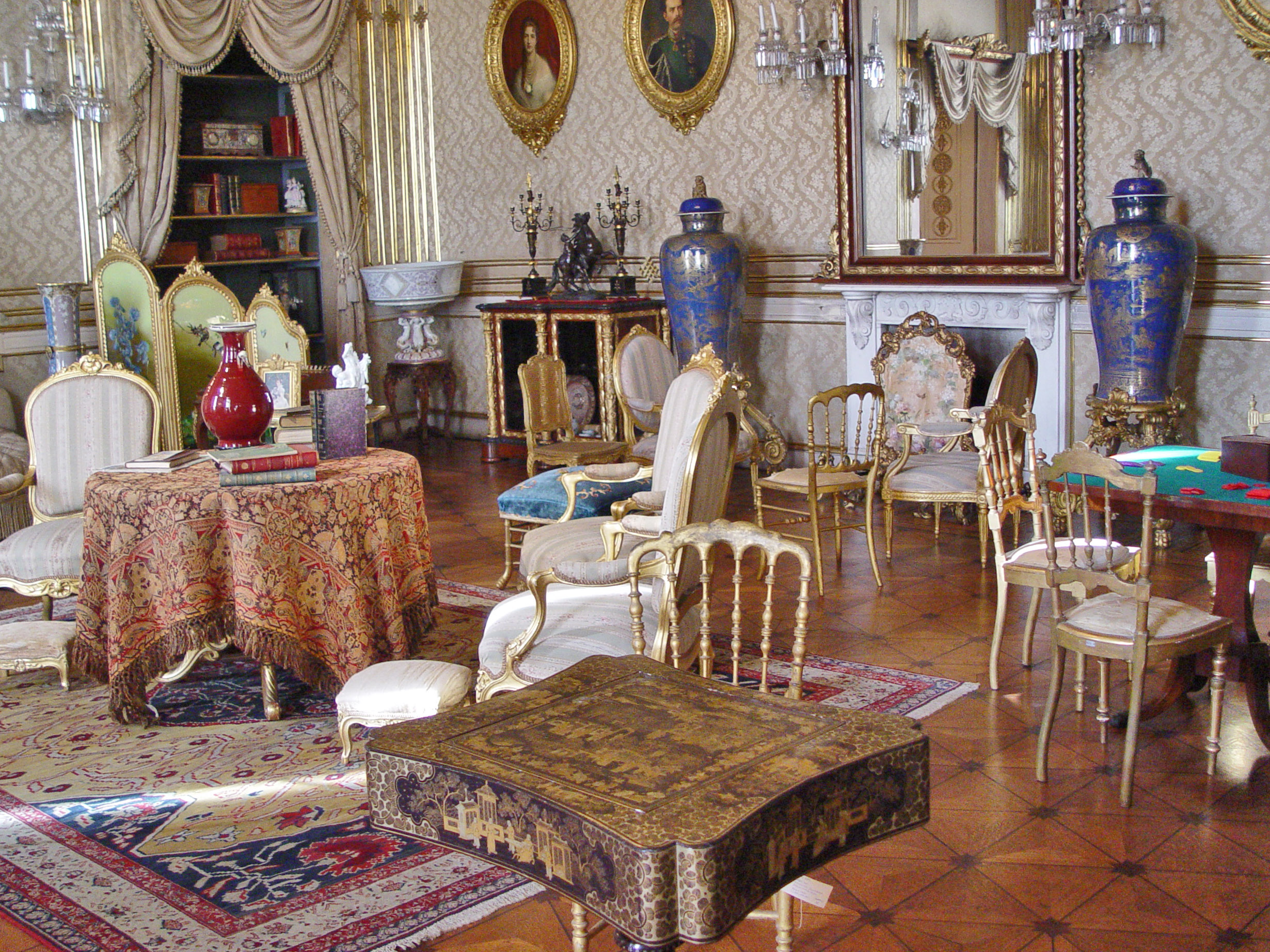
Blue Room

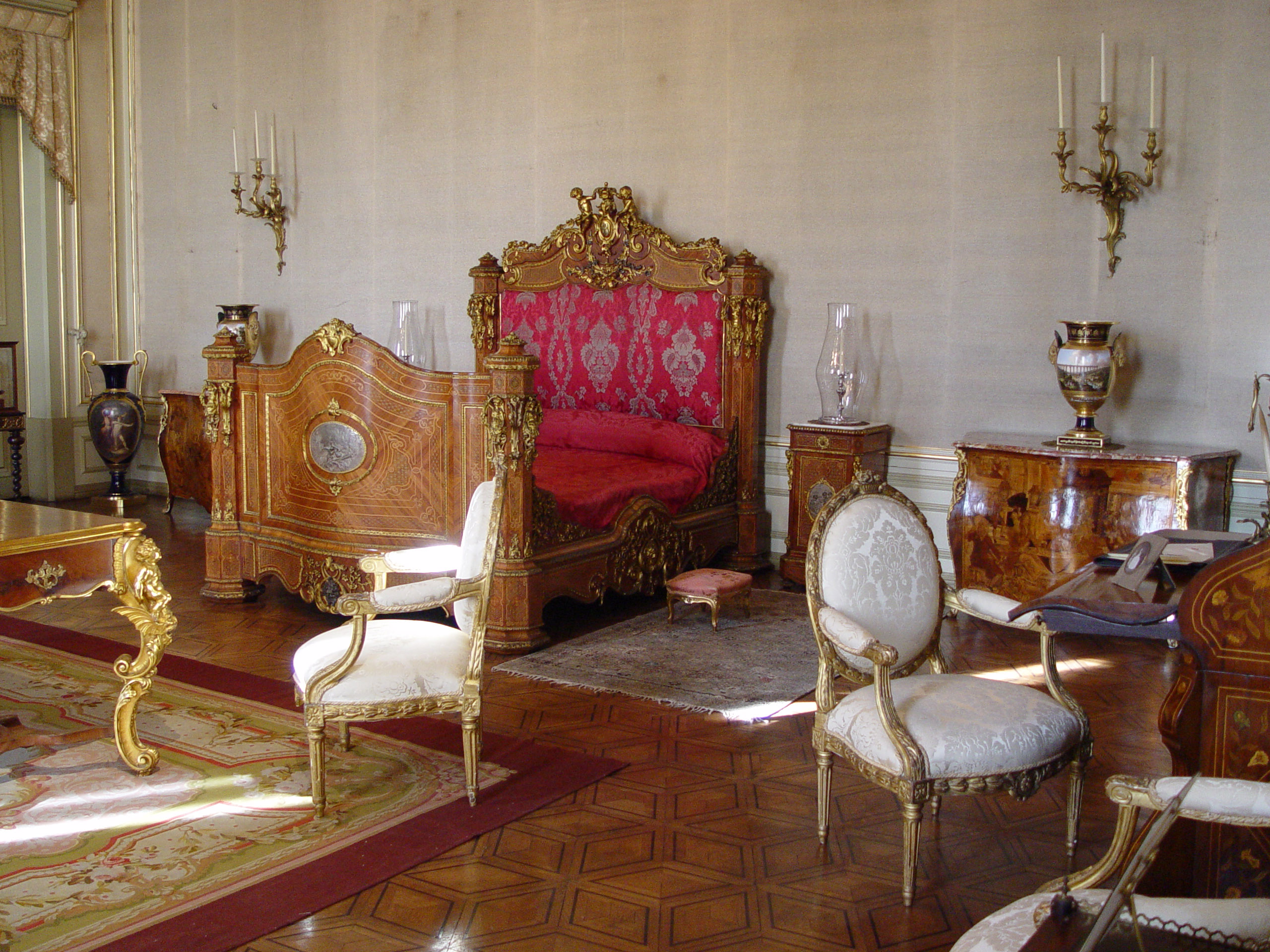
King Luis I's bedroom

Pink Room

Painting Room

The Queen's Room featuring the original furnishings and a large polar bear skin rug

Audience Room

Luís I Hall during a Baroque music concert

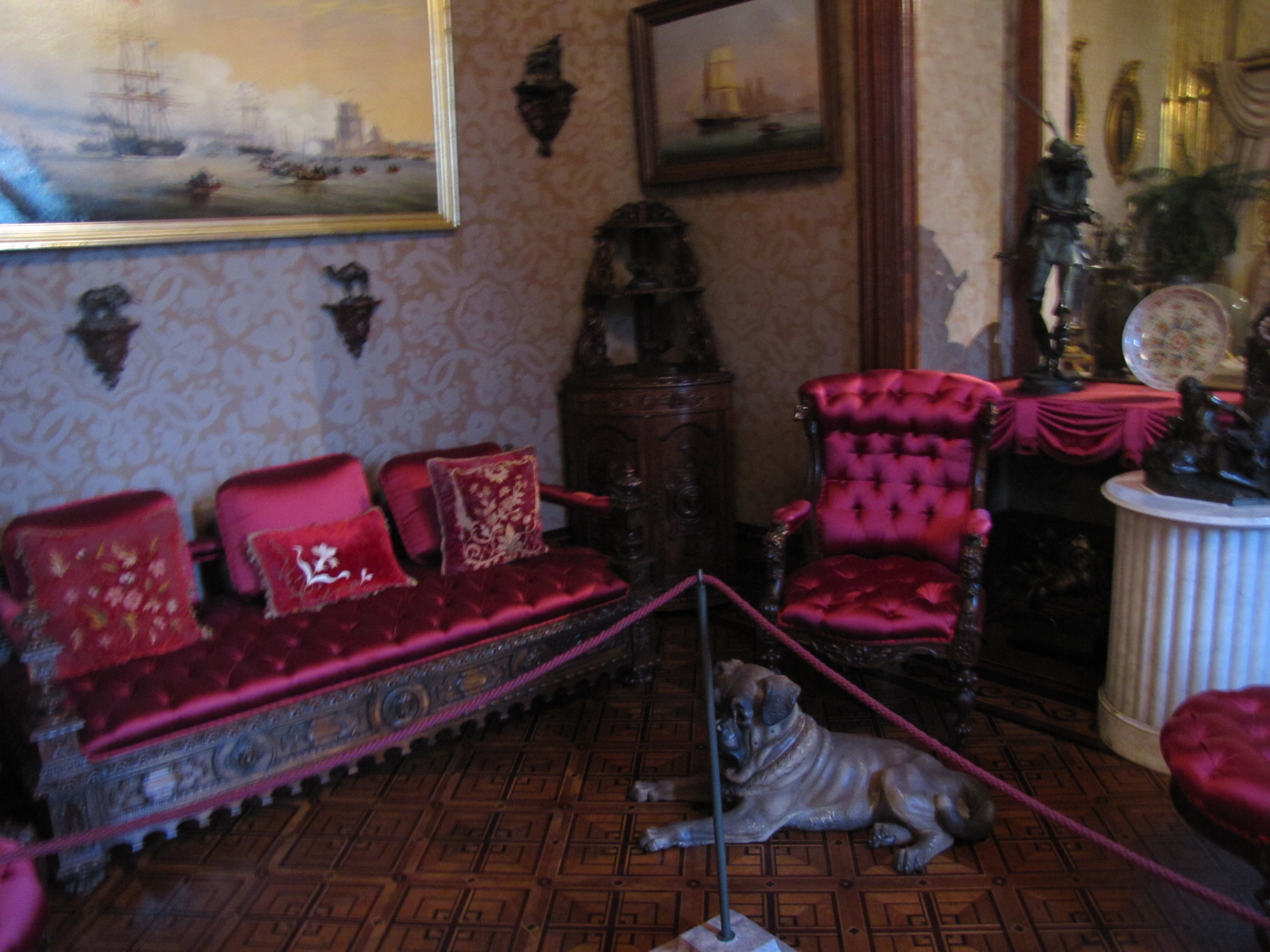
Oak Offices

Palace Vestibule

Private Dining Room

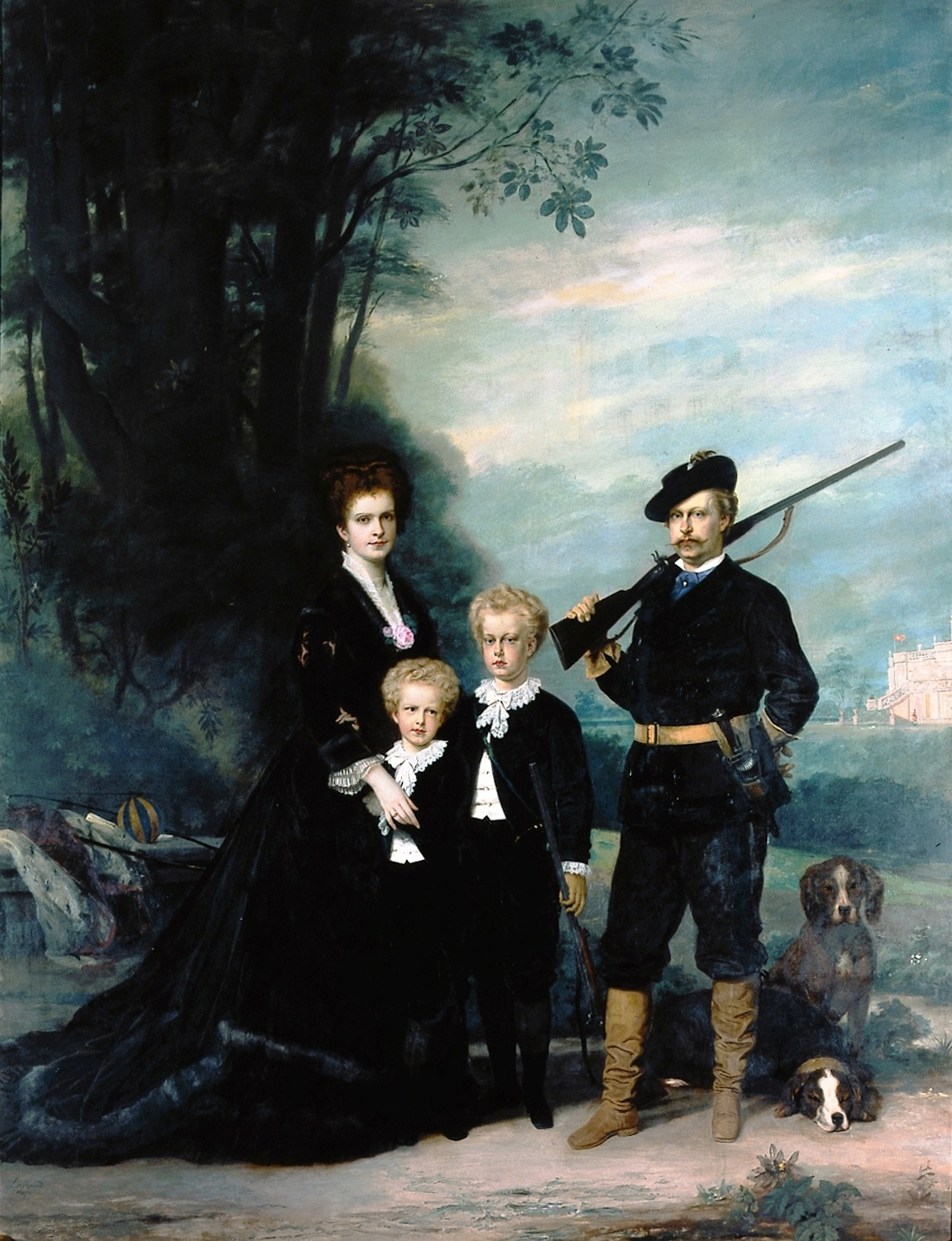
Portrait of the royal family in the Green Room

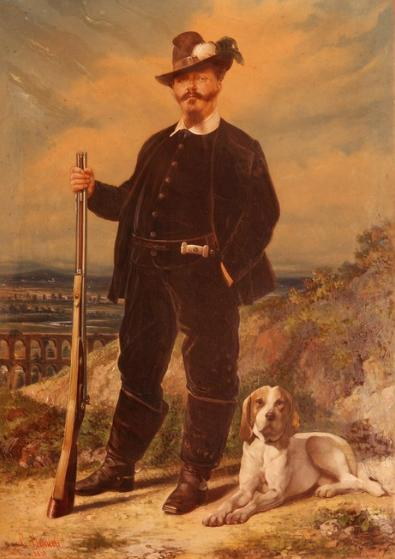
Portrait of Victor Emmanuel II in the Red Room

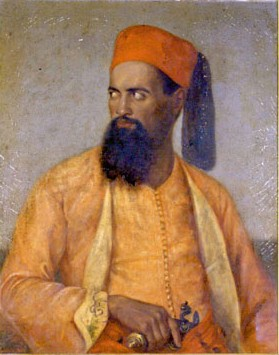
O Mouro by Marciano Henrique da Silva, in the private Library of the Palace

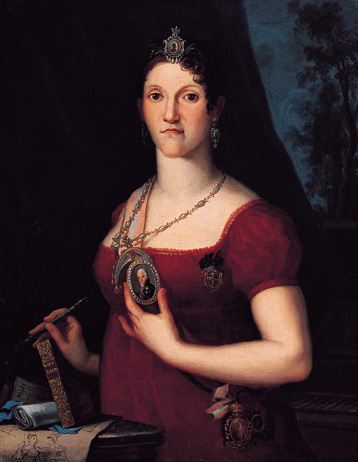
Painting of Queen Carlota Joaquina in the antechamber of the Throne Room
